= Forest Tradition of Ajahn Chah =

Mahanikai monastic organization

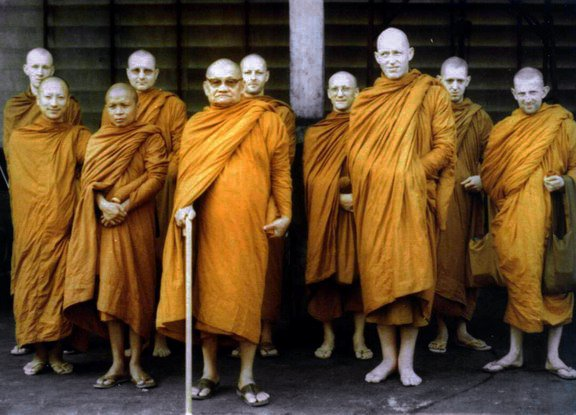
- Type: Monastic Organization
- School: Theravada Buddhism
- Lineage: Thai Forest Tradition
- Formation: 1967
- Founder: Ajahn Chah Subhaddo
- Headquarters: Wat Nong Pah Pong
- Leader: Ajahn Liem Thitadhammo
- Membership: 175
- Branches: 17

The Forest Tradition of Ajahn Chah is a Mahanikai monastic organization in the Thai Forest Tradition composed of the students of Ajahn Chah Subhaddo. Strictly speaking, the Forest Tradition of Ajahn Chah denotes the institutions who have a branch affiliation with Wat Pah Pong, the administrative center of the organization.

== History ==
=== Ajahn Chah's early training ===
Ajahn Jayasāro relates that while many Mahanikai monks would reordain in the Dhammayut order as an act of devotion to Ajahn Mun, a handful of other followers of Ajahn Mun would choose to stay Mahanikai monks.

==== Luang Por Thongrat ====
Ajahn Jayasaro relates that Ajahn Thongrat was considered "Zen Like", in the sense that he was very "Vigorous and outspoken — and outrageous — in his behaviour. Which of course in Thai monastic idiom, where etiquette and good behavior is so stressed, it quite made him stand out."

Little is known of Ajahn Chah's relationship with Ajahn Thongrat, though Ajahn Chah relates a story about the first time he had met Ajahn Thongrat. Upon hearing of Ajahn Thongrat's whereabouts, Ajahn Chah traveled a long distance to meet Ajahn Thongrat. When Ajahn Chah walked into the monastery where Ajahn Thongrat was staying, Ajahn Thongrat looked at Ajahn Chah for the first time and said "Oh, Chah! You've arrived at last!", which surprised Ajahn Chah, because there should have been no way that Ajahn Thongrat knew who Ajahn Chah was or that he was coming.

==== Ajahn Kinnari ====
Ajahn Chah met Ajahn Kinnari while wandering dhutanga. Ajahn Jayasaro talks about how when dhutanga monks encounter each other, they will sometimes relate information about good spots to meditate, or good monasteries or meditation teachers.

==== Establishment of Wat Pah Pong ====
Prior to establishing monasteries, Ajahn Chah wandered Dhutanga for 7 years, practicing in wilderness areas, caves and cremation grounds. After that period, he settled in a "fever ridden, haunted forest" known as "Pah Pong", and drew a following from there. A monastery was formed in the area, known today as Wat Pah Pong, in spite of poor living conditions and sparse food.

In 1967, Venerable Sumedho came to stay with Ajahn Chah at Wat Pah Pong. He found out about the monastery from one of Ajahn Chah's existing monks who happened to speak "a little bit of english".

=== Taking root in the west ===
==== Thailand ====
The first Thai monastery run by and for English-speaking monks was Wat Pah Nanachat which is located in Northeast Thailand about 15 kilometres from the city of Ubon Rachathani, founded in 1975.

==== England ====
Chithurst Buddhist Monastery or Cittaviveka was the first English monastery. In 1976, Ajahn Sumedho met George Sharp, Chairman of the English Sangha Trust. The Trust had been established in 1956 for the purpose of establishing a suitable residence for the training of Buddhist monks in England. By the 1970s, the Trust possessed a property in Hampstead that was not yet deemed suitable for what was desired. During a brief stay in London in 1978, Ajahn Sumedho, while undertaking the traditional alms round of Theravada monks (on Hampstead Heath), encountered a lone jogger who was struck by the Bhikkhu's outlandish attire. The jogger had, by chance, just acquired a piece of overgrown woodland in West Sussex. After expressing an interest in Buddhism, the gentleman attended a ten-day retreat at the Oaken Holt Buddhist Center near Oxford after which he offered the forest as a gift to the Sangha. In 1979, George Sharp purchased Chithurst House (a property adjacent to the wood) on behalf of The English Sangha Trust. Chithurst House gained legal recognition as a monastery in 1981. The monastery was named Cittaviveka, a Pali word meaning "the mind of non-attachment".

Harnham Buddhist Monastery, Aruna Ratanagiri was founded in June of the same year. Amaravati Buddhist Monastery (now the main headquarters of the U.K. monasteries) was established in 1984 and formally opened in 1985. A fourth location is The Forest Hermitage (Santidhamma & Bhavanadhamma) (founded by Ajahn Khemadhammo).

==== United States ====
In the 1980s Ajahn Sumedho started getting requests to teach in California. Visits by either himself or one of his senior monks or nuns resulted in the Sanghapala Foundation being set up in 1988. A plot of 120 acres (0.49 km^{2}) about 13 miles (21 km) north of Ukiah, California was given directly to Ajahn Sumedho by Chan Master Hsuan Hua, founder of the City of Ten Thousand Buddhas in Talmage, California, before he died in 1995, would become Abhayagiri Buddhist Monastery. Currently, the monastery rests on 280 acres (1.1 km^{2}) of mountainous forest land.

==== Other western countries ====
The Thai Forest Tradition also exists in:

- Australia (Buddha Bodhivana Monastery, Bodhisaddha Forest Monastery, Bodhipāla Monastery, Dhammagiri Forest Monastery, Vimokkharam Forest Hermitage, Wat Buddha Dhamma )
- Brazil (Suddhavāri Monastery)
- Canada (Tisarana Buddhist Monastery, Arrow River Forest Hermitage, Birken Forest Monastery)
- New Zealand (Bodhinyanarama Monastery and Vimutti Buddhist Monastery)
- Switzerland (Kloster Dhammapala monastery)
- Germany (Muttodaya Waldkloster Forest Monastery, Metta Vihara and Anenja Vihara)
- Italy (Santacittarama monastery)
- Norway (Lokuttara Vihara (Skiptvet Buddhist Monastery))
- Portugal (Sumedharama)
- Slovenia (Samanadipa Forest Hermitage)

=== The Order of Siladhara ===
==== Establishment ====
The Siladhara Order is a Theravada Buddhist female monastic order established by Ajahn Sumedho at Chithurst Buddhist Monastery, England. In 1983, he obtained permission from the Sangha in Thailand, to give a ten-precept pabbajja to the women, making them officially recognized female renunciants trained in the Ajahn Chah lineage. The reasons for its establishment are due to the historical loss of the bhikkhuni (nun's) ordination in Theravada Buddhism.

The female monastic community began in 1979, when Chithurst Monastery admitted four Western women as anagārikās. From 1979 to 1983 the women lived in a cottage a short walk from the main house, on the edge of Chithurst forest. In 1983, Ajahn Sumedho ordained the nuns as 10 Precept sīladhārā nuns at Chithurst. In 1984 the order outgrew the cottage, and the nuns community moved to Amaravati. According to the Forest Sangha newsletter: "Some years later a small group of nuns returned to Chithurst Monastery to establish a second sīladhārā community there."

==== Milntuim House ====
In 2012, another center for the Siladharas was purchased in Perthshire, Scotland, known as the Milntuim House. Ajahn Candasiri writes:

The intention is for Milntuim eventually to be a place where sīladharā and anagārikās can live in community for periods of time following a monastic routine, hopefully, without some of the complexities of the larger double communities. There would also be facilities for individual sīladharā to spend up to several months in solitary retreat. In addition I would hope that it can support the practice of lay friends near and far and – as far as our monastic discipline permits – integrate with the local community.

=== 2009 Ordination at Bodhinyana ===
On 22 October 2009 Ajahn Brahm facilitated an ordination ceremony for bhikkhunis where four female Buddhists, Venerable Ajahn Vayama, and Venerables Nirodha, Seri and Hasapanna, were ordained into Ajahn Brahm's lineage. Bhante Sujato along with his teacher Ajahn Brahm were involved with re-establishing bhikkhuni Ordination in the Forest sangha of Ajahn Chah. Bhante Sujato along with other scholars such as Brahm and Bhikkhu Analayo had come to the conclusion that there was no valid reason the extinct bhikkhuni order couldn't be re-established. A number of Buddhist monastics and scholars worldwide expressed sympathy with Brahm's stance, expressing concern at what they perceived to be limitations, contradictions and ahistoricism in structural approaches to the currently existing Siladhara Order and its barriers placed on full bhikkuni ordination. The ordination ceremony however, led to Brahm's expulsion from the Thai Forest Lineage of Ajahn Chah. The ordination ceremony took place at Ajahn Brahm's Bodhinyana Monastery at Serpentine (near Perth, WA), Australia. For his actions of 22 October 2009, on 1 November 2009, at a meeting of senior members of the Thai monastic sangha, held at Wat Pah Pong, Ubon Ratchathani, Thailand, Brahm was removed from the Ajahn Chah Forest Sangha lineage and is no longer associated with the main monastery in Thailand, Wat Pah Pong, nor with any of the other Western Forest Sangha branch monasteries of the Ajahn Chah tradition. Bhante Sujato—remaining faithful to his convictions that there was no reason the order should not be revived—resisted pressure and intimidation and went on to found Santi Forest Monastery, and, following Bhante Sujato's wishes, Santi became a thriving and successful Bhikkhunī ( Buddhist nun's ) monastery Vihara in 2012.
