= Ajahn Sucitto =

British-born Theravada Buddhist monk (born 1949)

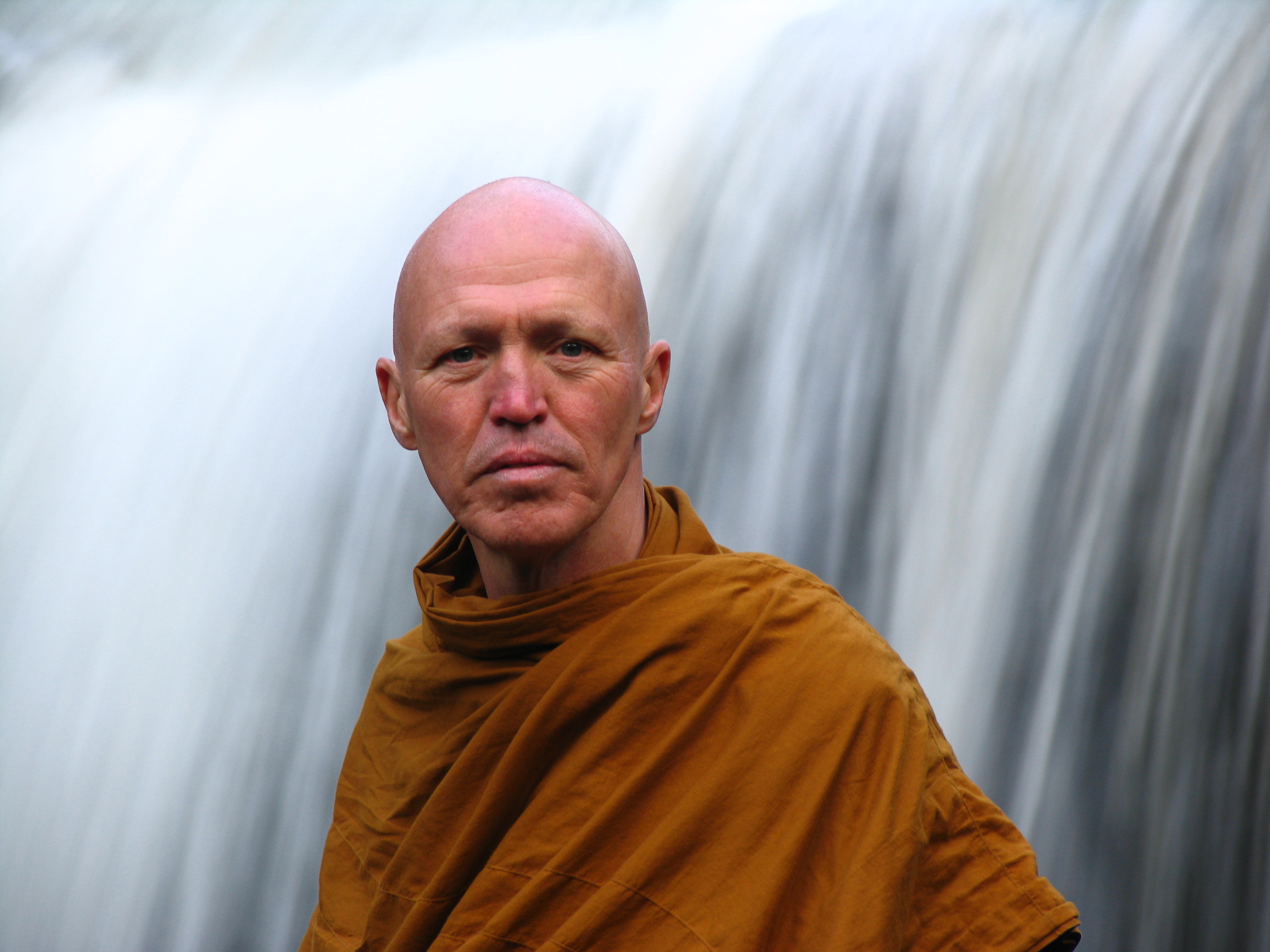
- Ajahn Sucitto
- Title: Ajahn Sucitto Mahathera

Personal life
- Born: 4 November 1949 (age 77) London, England
- Occupation: Buddhist monk
- Website: www.cittaviveka.org/; www.ajahnsucitto.org

Religious life
- Religion: Buddhism
- School: Theravada

Ajahn Sucitto (Bhikkhu Sucitto, born 4 November 1949) is a British-born Theravada Buddhist monk (Ajahn is the Thai rendition of ācārya, the Sanskrit word for 'spiritual teacher'). He was, between 1992 and 2014, the abbot of Cittaviveka, Chithurst Buddhist Monastery. Sucitto was born in London and ordained in Thailand in March 1976. He returned to Britain in 1978 and took up training under Ajahn Sumedho at the Hampstead Buddhist Vihara. In 1979 he was one of the small group of monks, led by Ajahn Sumedho, who established Cittaviveka, Chithurst Buddhist Monastery, in West Sussex. In 1981 he was sent up to Northumberland to set up a small monastery in Harnham, which subsequently became Aruna Ratanagiri. In 1984 he accompanied Ajahn Sumedho in establishing Amaravati Buddhist Monastery in Hertfordshire. In 1992 he was appointed abbot of Cittaviveka. On 26 October 2014, he resigned the post, but intends to continue teaching as before.

Ajahn Sucitto's main work has been in teaching, editing and writing, although he was also largely responsible for the creation of the protocols and standards that flesh out the ten-precept training of the nuns Siladhara Order.

== Biography ==
Before entering monastic life, Ajahn Sucitto graduated from the University of Warwick with a degree in English and American Literature in 1971. He spent a few years following the lifestyle of the alternative culture of the time, before heading overland to India in 1974 on a spiritual quest. This eventually landed him in Thailand in 1975, where he was inspired by a meditation class in English in Wat Meung Maung given by an English monk, Phra Alan Nyānavajīro. Phra Nyānavajīro's teaching was based on the "Mahasi Sayadaw" system (also known as "Burmese satipaṭṭhāna"). Sensing an important turn in his spiritual journey, Sucitto entered the monastery where Phra Nyānavajīro lived: Wat Kiriwong in Nakhon Sawan. On 25 September he took samanera precepts and on 22 March 1976 he was ordained as a bhikkhu (Buddhist monk), both in Wat Potharam in Nakhon Sawan.

A chance sojourn at Wat Umong in Chiang Mai in December 1976 brought Sucitto into contact with Ajahn Sumedho, who was passing through Chiang Mai at the time. This was an auspicious encounter, as it prepared the ground for Sucitto to visit Ajahn Sumedho in Hampstead when he visited England in 1978. Ajahn Sumedho had taken up residence in the Hampstead Buddhist Vihara in 1977, and readily accepted Sucitto as a disciple. Sucitto trained under Ajahn Sumedho for much of the ensuing fourteen years.

With a few others, they spent the Rains Retreat of 1978 at Oaken Holt Buddhist Centre, Farmoor, Oxfordshire. In 1979 the English Sangha Trust, owners of the Hampstead Vihara, sold that property and purchased Chithurst House in West Sussex. This property was adjacent to Hammer Wood, which had been given to the Sangha as a result of an alms-round on Hampstead Heath, north London. Accordingly, Sucitto was part of the small monastic group led by Ajahn Sumedho that moved there in June 1979 to establish Cittaviveka, Chithurst Buddhist Monastery.

Later in 1981, he was sent to Harham in Northumberland to begin the work of establishing a monastery there. After a few months of foundational work, he returned to Cittaviveka. A subsequent sojourn in Devon occasioned one of the first tudong ("austere") walks in Britain, from Honiton to Chithurst in 1982. This inspired Ajahn Amaro to undertake a similar walk from Chithurst to Harnham the following year.

In 1984, Ajahn Sumedho asked Sucitto to guide the newly ordained ten-precept nuns (sīladharā). Out of this, over the next seven years, a detailed system of protocols and procedures grew to facilitate the Buddhist religious life for women.

On 31 July 1984, Ajahn Sucitto was sent with Ajahn Viradhammo to prepare the newly acquired St Margaret's School near Hemel Hempstead in Hertfordshire for Sangha occupancy. Ajahn Sumedho and the rest of the community arrived the next day and so established Amaravati Buddhist Monastery. Amaravati's main aims were to house the nuns' community (which has outgrown Cittaviveka) to offer further accommodation for bhikkhus and hold retreats and public occasions for laypeople.

On 7 June 1992, a year after returning from India, Ajahn Sucitto was appointed abbot of Cittaviveka. He is currently based there, but travels on teaching engagements and has undertaken the Kailas pilgrimage (2004).

== Teaching ==
Other than the general programme of manual work, meditation and training, much of Ajahn Sucitto's contribution to the community was via writing. He wrote and edited the community's Newsletter for 16.5 years and edited or managed the editing of most of the collections of Ajahn Sumedho's talks between 1983 and 1992. He has also written several books of his own teachings, and co-authored (with Nick Scott) a two-volume account of the six-month walking pilgrimage that they undertook in India and Nepal between November 1990 through April 1991 (Rude Awakenings and Great Patient One). He also co-supervises (with Ajahn Abhinando) a website for spiritually inspired poetry called Dhamma Moon. All books are available for free distribution and also free to download.

Ajahn Sucitto began teaching retreats for laypeople after the Rains Retreat (that is, autumn) of 1981. He has continued to teach retreats in Britain and overseas ever since.

== Publications ==
- An Outline of Buddhism (Amaravati Publications, 2020)
- Cultivating Empathy (Amaravati Publications, 2015)
- Great Patient One
- Meditation: An Outline
- Meditation: A Way of Awakening (Amaravati Publications, 2011)
- Mindfulness, its Friends and Relatives (Amaravati Publications, 2015)
- Parami, Ways to Cross Life's Floods (Amaravati Publications, 2012)
- Rude Awakenings
- Samādhi is Pure Enjoyment (Amaravati Publications, 2014)
- The Good Friend (Amaravati Publications, 2010)
- The Graduated Path (Amaravati Publications, 2016)
- The Most Precious Gift (Amaravati Publications, 2019)
- Turning the Wheel of Truth: Commentary on the Buddha's first Teaching (Shambala, 2010)
- Unseating the Inner Tyrant (Amaravati Publications, 2014)
- Walking Dhutanga In Britain (BPS, Bodhi Leaves No. 104)

== See also ==
- Thai Forest Tradition
- Chithurst Buddhist Monastery
- Aruna Ratanagiri
- Ajahn Chah
- Ajahn Sumedho
- Ajahn Viradhammo
