= Abhayagiri Buddhist Monastery =

Buddhist monastery in Redwood Valley, California

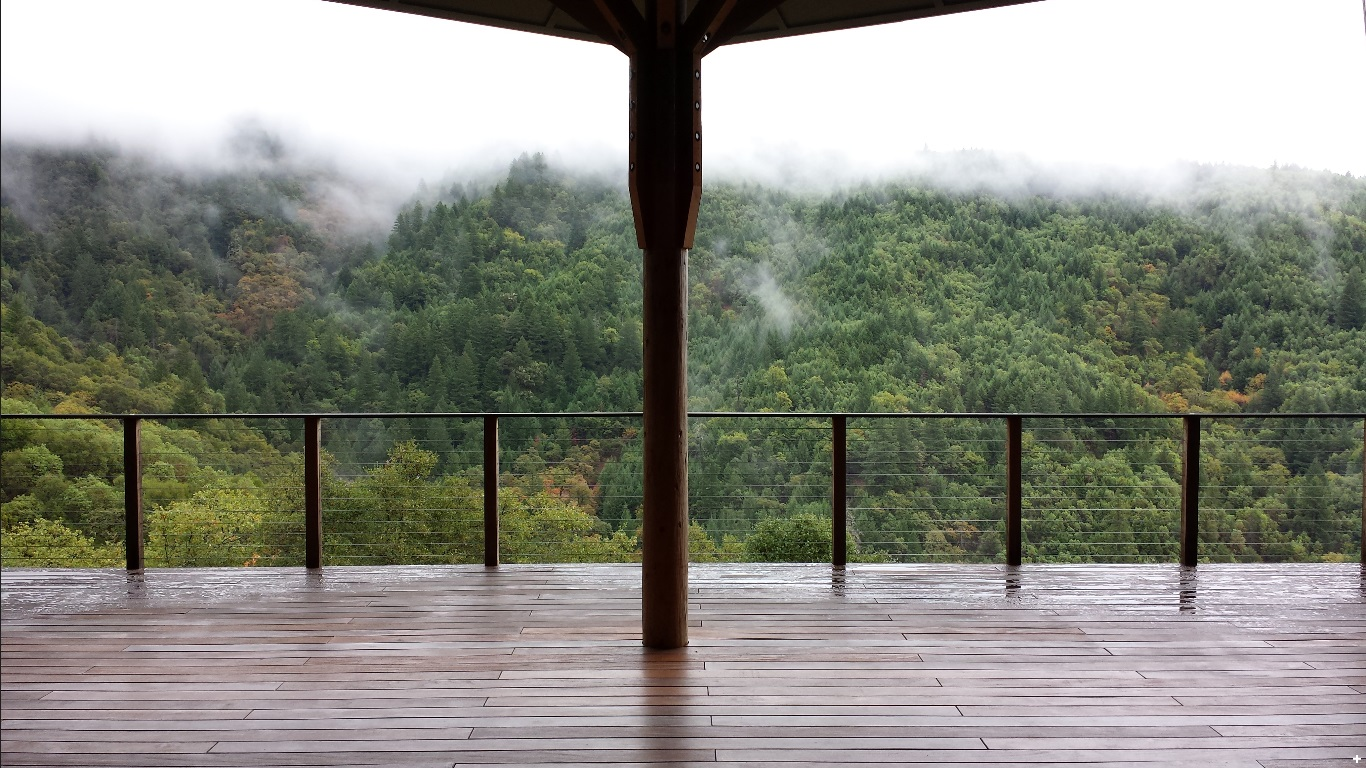
- View from the Bhikkhu Commons (Monks' Utility Building, or MUB)

- Location within California

Religion
- Affiliation: Thai Forest Tradition

Location
- Location: Abhayagiri Buddhist Monastery 16201 Tomki Road Redwood Valley, CA 95470, United States
- Country: United States
- Coordinates: 39°21′39″N 123°14′00″W

Architecture
- Completed: 2018

Website
- http://www.abhayagiri.org/

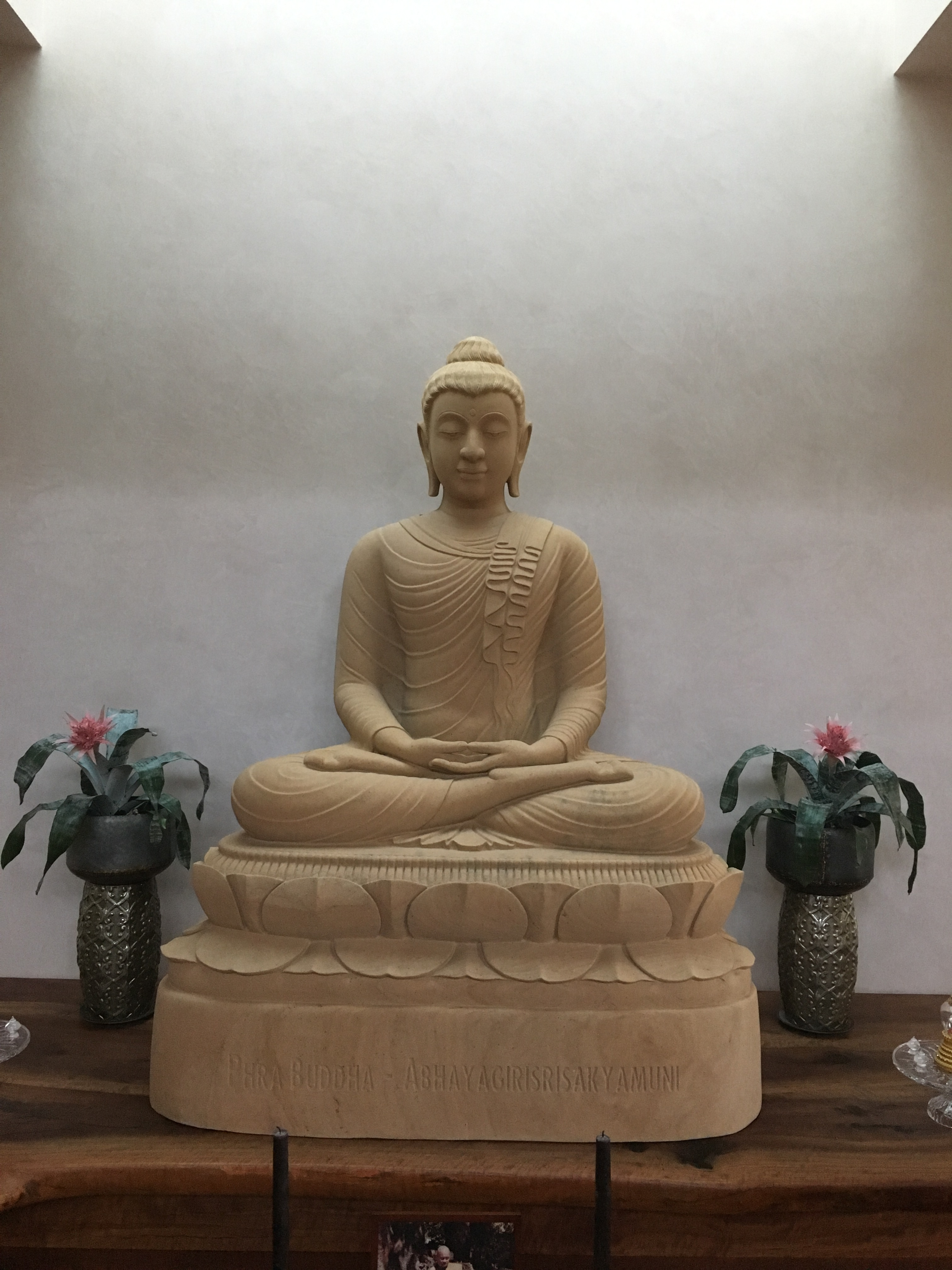
Buddha statue at Abhayagiri

Abhayagiri is a Theravadin Buddhist monastery of the Thai Forest Tradition in Redwood Valley, California. Its chief priorities are the teaching of Buddhist ethics, together with traditional concentration and insight meditation (also known as the Noble Eightfold Path), as an effective way of completely uprooting suffering and discontent. Abhayagiri means 'fearless mountain' in the Pali language.

== Origins and development ==
About 16 miles (26 km) north of Ukiah, the monastery has its origins in the 1980s when the UK-based Ajahn Sumedho, foremost western disciple of the Thai meditation master Ajahn Chah, started getting requests to teach in California. Visits by Ajahn Sumedho, as well as other senior monks and nuns, resulted in the Sanghapala Foundation being set up in 1988. The monastery's first 120 acres (0.49 km^{2}) were given to the foundation by the devotees of Chan Master Hsuan Hua, founder of the City of Ten Thousand Buddhas in Talmage, before he died in 1995. Currently, the monastery rests on 280 acres (1.1 km^{2}) of mountainous forest land.

Six months after the monastery was settled by Ajahn Amaro, Ajahn Pasanno arrived to join him as co-abbot. They served together in this role until July, 2010, when Ajahn Amaro departed to take up the invitation to serve as abbot of Amaravati Buddhist Monastery in England. Ajahn Pasanno was the sole abbot of Abhayagiri between July, 2010 and July, 2018.

Abhayagiri Monastery developed significantly under Ajahn Pasanno's and Ajahn Amaro's leadership and guidance, along with the support of the monastic and lay community, and more specifically, the Abhayagiri Building Committee. Over 25 kutis, monastic huts, were built in the mountainous monastery forest during their time as co-abbots as well as when Ajahn Pasanno was the lone abbot. In addition, during the early years, the co-abbots converted both current and new buildings into a Dhamma Hall, kitchen, office spaces, a room for disabled visitors, a laundry room and bathrooms/showers for lay women and men, along with monastery infrastructure and extensive creation of forest paths and roads.

The co-abbots also contributed to the building of the Bhikkhu Commons, more affectionately known to the residents as the MUB: Monks' Utility Building, a 1600 square foot complex located in the upper forest of the monastery. The MUB offers monks access to bathrooms, showers, a multipurpose meeting room, a large sewing room, a laundry room, a small kitchenette and a large storage room below. The MUB was dedicated and officially opened on July 4, 2010.

After Ajahn Amaro's departure to England in July, 2010 building a new Reception Hall was the next major undertaking of Ajahn Pasanno and the Abhayagiri Community. This took more than three years of planning and 4 years of building and would be a two-story complex with over 3000 square feet of covered outdoor decks and 6000 square feet of internal space. The internal space included a spacious meditation hall, a larger, commercial style kitchen, a library, a food storage room, guest rooms, a child care room, multiple bathrooms, showers for laymen, a laundry room, a small shrine room/reliquary, and a large storage room. Major landscaping was also accomplished. The Reception Hall building broke ground in July, 2013 and ended all construction on June 30, 2018 with the cloister area inauguration.

Also in 2010, Ajahn Pasanno supported the establishment of the Pacific Hermitage, a branch of Abhayagiri Monastery, founded in the Columbia River Gorge along a forested stretch in White Salmon, Washington. Through Ajahn Pasanno's encouragement, Ajahn Sudanto lead the effort to establish the Pacific Hermitage. Three years after its founding, the hermitage was offered a purchased property on the outskirts of White Salmon where it is presently located. Three monks typically stay in residence at the Hermitage, year round.

The October 2017 Northern California wildfires threatened Abhayagiri but it survived undamaged.

At the end of Ajahn Pasanno's tenure as abbot, July 11, 2018, he departed for a year sabbatical leaving the monastery to co-abbots Ajahn Karunadhammo and Ajahn Nyaniko for the foreseeable future. Ajahn Pasanno plans to reside at Abhayagiri after his sabbatical, but will not be taking up the role of abbot when he returns.

== Lifestyle ==
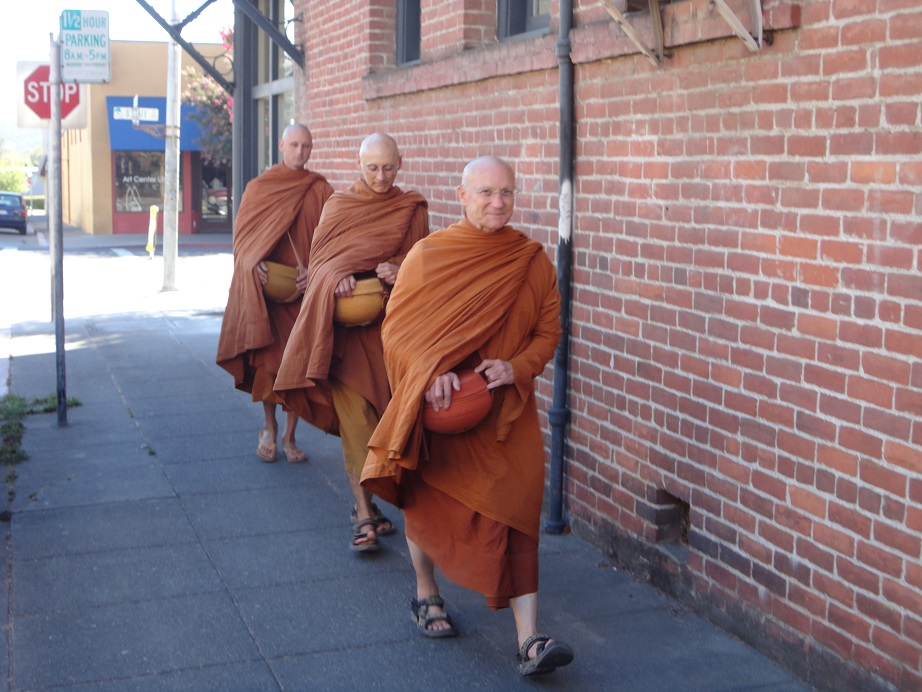
Ajahn Pasanno, Ajahn Karuṇadhammo, and Ajahn Ñāniko walking in Ukiah, accepting offerings of alms food. Full Moon Observance Day, September 2013

As of July 2018, there were two abbots (co-abbots), a total of 13 fully ordained bhikkhus (Buddhist monks), two samaneras (novices), and 4 anagarikas (postulants) and a long term female monastic resident. Men and women live in separate locations in the monastery following guidelines of formal celibacy. Male residents live in small huts nestled in the forest. Female residents live in a house and a couple of huts on an adjoining property which was separately donated for the purpose of housing women at the monastery. Guest teachers come from forest monasteries in Thailand, England, as well as other countries in Europe and Australia. Visitors come to the monastery regularly for day visits, and can also stay as overnight guests.

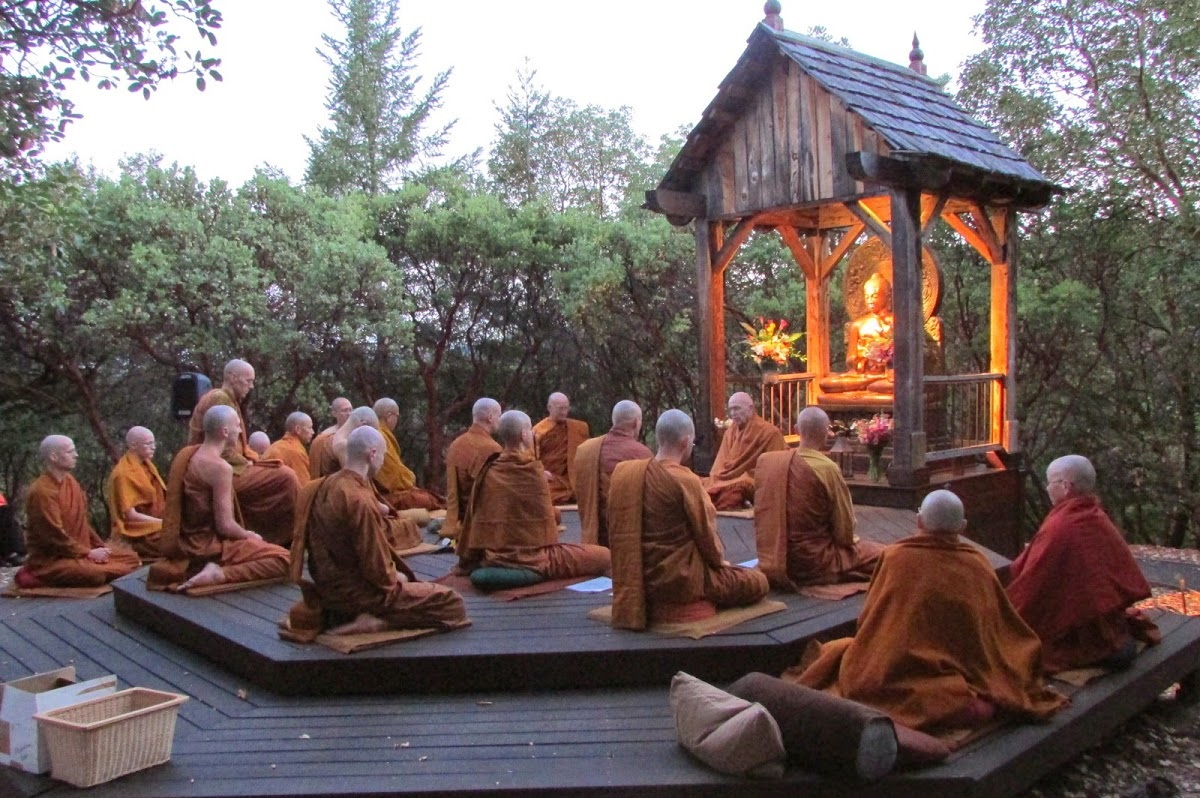
Abhayagiri Buddhist Monastery, Asalha Puja 2014

The daily schedule, in keeping with tradition, is rigorous. Most residents (monastics and lay visitors) rise well before sunrise. Morning puja begins at 5:00 am and lasts an hour and a half. It includes chanting in both Pali and English, as well as an hour of silent meditation. This is followed by a half-hour chore period and a simple oatmeal breakfast. At 7:30 am, there is a meeting where a short Dhamma reflection is given and work assignments for the morning period are announced. A three-hour work period follows this meeting, ending with a meal around 11:00 am, which has to be consumed before midday. All lay residents follow the 8 precepts which include not eating food after noon until dawn the next day. Around 1:00 pm, after the post-meal cleanup, the schedule is open for individual practice of sitting and walking meditation as well as Dhamma study. It is at this time that monks, in addition to their meditation and study practice, care for their personal requisites like the huts they live in and the robes they wear. One can also walk around the extensive network of trails that wind about the mountainside. At 5:30 pm, tea is served in the kitchen and on most days one of the Ajahns is available in the Dhamma Hall for questions and answers. Tea time is followed by the evening puja beginning at 7:00 pm, which includes chanting in Pali and another hour of silent meditation. Formal Dhamma talks are offered on Saturday evening and lunar observance days during evening puja just after the period for silent meditation. On lunar observance days, which mark the four moon quarters, sitting and walking meditation continue until 3:00 am the next morning, followed by a morning puja.

Special lunar observance days at Abhayagiri include Asalha Puja, which commemorates the first teaching given by the Buddha after he attained enlightenment and the first time another being attained stream-entry as a result of the Buddha’s teaching. The next day is the beginning of vassa (Thai: พรรษา), the three-month Rains Retreat where monks are required to stay at a single residence for the duration of this time (they can leave for 6 days at time under specific circumstances). Vassa is followed by Kathina, a festival in which the laity expresses gratitude to monks and offers to the monastic community gifts of cloth and supplies that will be useful for the coming year. The cloth is then cut, sewn and dyed by the monks to make a robe on that day to offer to one of the Saṅgha. Other days that the monastic community at Abhayagiri sets aside each year for special commemoration include Ajahn Chah’s birthday (June 17), Vesakha Puja (usually the first full moon of May), and Magha Puja (usually on a full moon in late February/ early March).

== Programs and teaching in the community ==
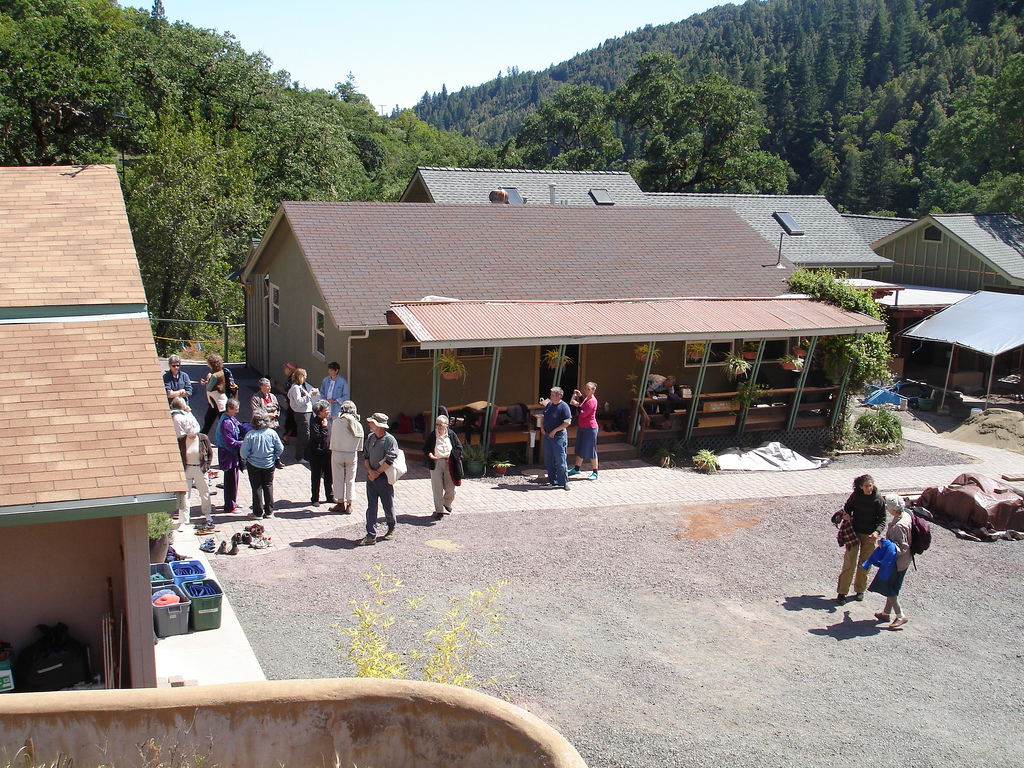
Abhayagiri monastery

Abhayagiri offers a variety of programs and teachings throughout the year. The Upāsikā Program was created for laypeople in order to assist individual practice, enhance spiritual training, and deepen both the intellectual and experiential understanding of Dhamma. Upāsikā Days are held throughout the year at the monastery and are open both to those who have made a formal commitment to the program and to those who may simply wish to attend for the day. Each year’s commitment ceremony takes place in the spring. There is a different theme for the teachings that are offered on each Upāsikā Day.

Members of the Abhayagiri Saṅgha regularly travel from Abhayagiri throughout the year to offer teachings in the immediate area and other parts of the country. Once a month, they offer teachings at Yoga Mendocino (Ukiah, California), at the Three Jewels Meditation Hall (Fort Bragg, California), and at Berkeley Buddhist Monastery, and they offer teachings at least once throughout the year at Portland Friends of the Dhamma (Oregon), Spirit Rock Meditation Center, Insight Santa Cruz, and the Common Ground Meditation Center (Minneapolis, Minnesota).

== See also ==
- Forest Tradition of Ajahn Chah
- Wat Pah Pong, Thailand
- Wat Pah Nanachat, Thailand
- Amaravati Buddhist Monastery, UK
- Chithurst Buddhist Monastery, UK
- Aruna Ratanagiri, UK
- Santacittarama, Italy
- Bodhinyana Monastery, Australia
- Birken Forest Buddhist Monastery, Canada
- Index of Buddhism-related articles
