= Wat Tham Saeng Phet =

Coordinates: 15.8952°N 104.7293°E

Wat Tham Saeng Phet (Thai: วัดถ้ำแสงเพชร) is a Buddhist temple near Amnat Charoen, Thailand. It is located on Amnat Charoen-Khemarat Road 18 kilometres from the Amnat Charoen, 2 kilometres off the main road uphill. Located on a large sandstone plain, the temple has a vihara, a pagoda, and a huge reclining Buddha. North of the vihara is a large cave housing a Buddha image. This cave is named Saeng Phet or "diamond’s glitters" due to its flashing glitter rock. Wat Tham Saeng Phet is meditation centre of those who honour Ajahn Chah, a famous monk from Wat Nong Pah Pong. Foreign monks often practice mediation here.
