= Chithurst Buddhist Monastery =

English Theravada Buddhist monastery

Coordinates: 51°00′13″N 0°48′05″W

Cittaviveka Buddhist Monastery
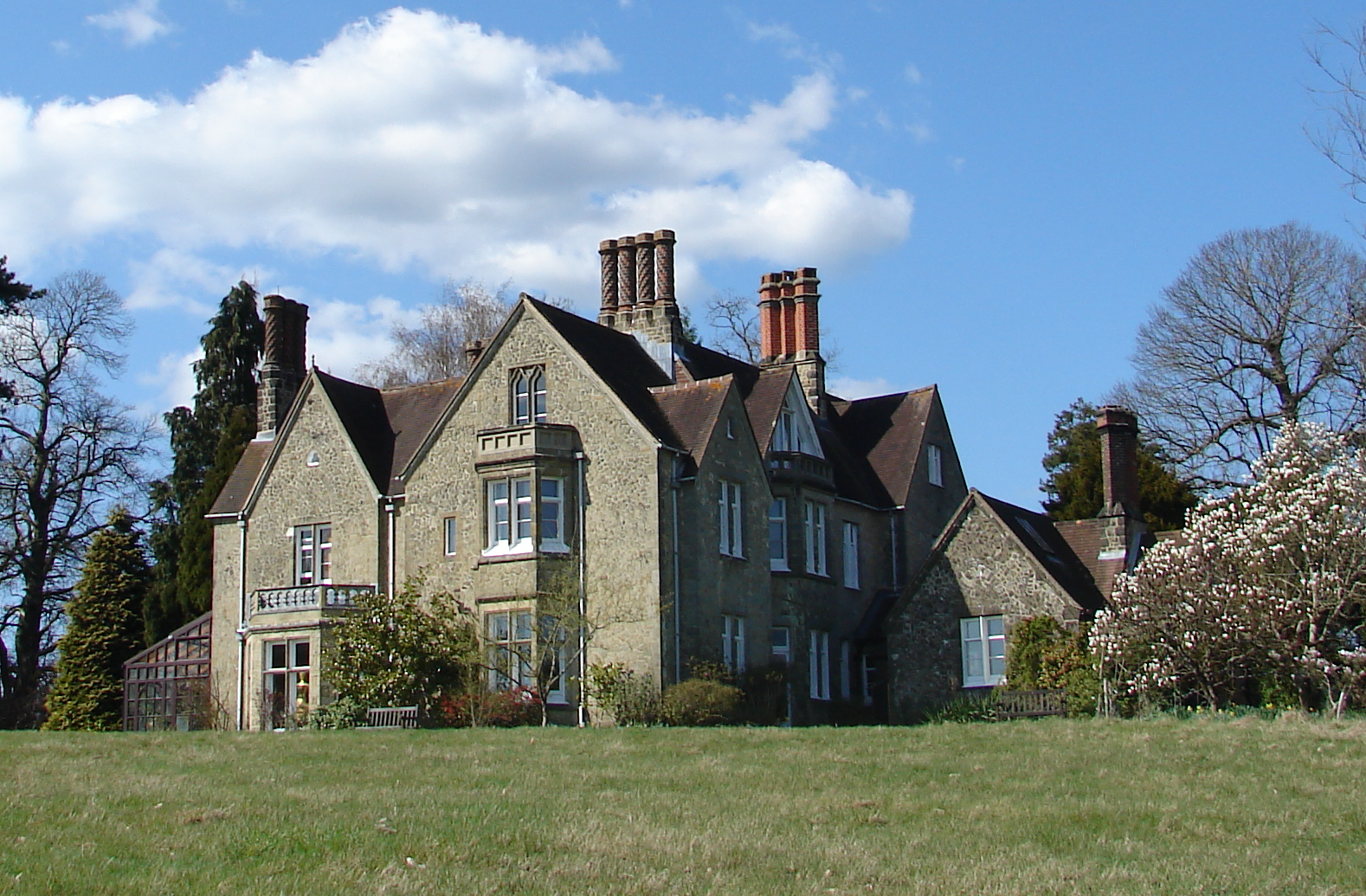
- The main building at Chithurst Buddhist monastery

Religion
- Affiliation: Thai Forest Tradition

Location
- Location: Cittaviveka Chithurst Buddhist Monastery Chithurst (W. Sussex), Petersfield, Hampshire GU31 5EU
- Country: United Kingdom
- Interactive map of Cittaviveka Buddhist Monastery

Architecture
- Founder: Venerable Ajahn Sumedho Mahathera
- Established: 1979

Website
- cittaviveka.org

Cittaviveka (Pali: 'discerning mind'), commonly known as Chithurst Buddhist Monastery, is an English Theravada Buddhist monastery in the Thai Forest Tradition. It is situated in West Sussex, England in the hamlet of Chithurst between Midhurst and Petersfield. It was established in 1979 in accordance with the aims of the English Sangha Trust, a charity founded in 1956 to support the ordination and training of Buddhist monks (bhikkhus) in the West. The current abbot, since 2019, is Ajahn Ahimsako.

The monastery was established by Ajahn Sumedho under the auspices of his teacher, Ajahn Chah of Wat Pah Pong, Ubon, Thailand. Ajahn Chah visited the monastery at its inception as the first branch monastery of Wat Pah Pong to be established outside of Thailand. Although the style of the monastery has been modified to accommodate Western social and cultural mores, it retains close links with Thailand especially monasteries of the Thai Forest Tradition and is supported by an international community of Asians and Westerners.

"Cittaviveka" is a term used in the Pāli scriptures of Theravada Buddhism. The monastery was so named by Ajahn Sumedho, the first abbot (1979–1984) as a suitable word-play on "Chithurst," the hamlet in which its main house is situated. The title "Chithurst Buddhist Monastery" is also commonly used, although the approximately 175 acres/70 hectares of the monastery's land extend into the adjacent parish.

Subsequent abbots have been Ajahn Ānando (1984–1992), Ajahn Sucitto (1992–2014), Ajahn Karuniko (2014–2019) and Ajahn Ahimsako (2019–present, see https://www.cittaviveka.org/guiding-elders for biography). The monastery is supported by donations, and lay people may visit or stay for a period of time as guests free of charge. Teachings are given on a regular basis, generally on weekends.

== History ==
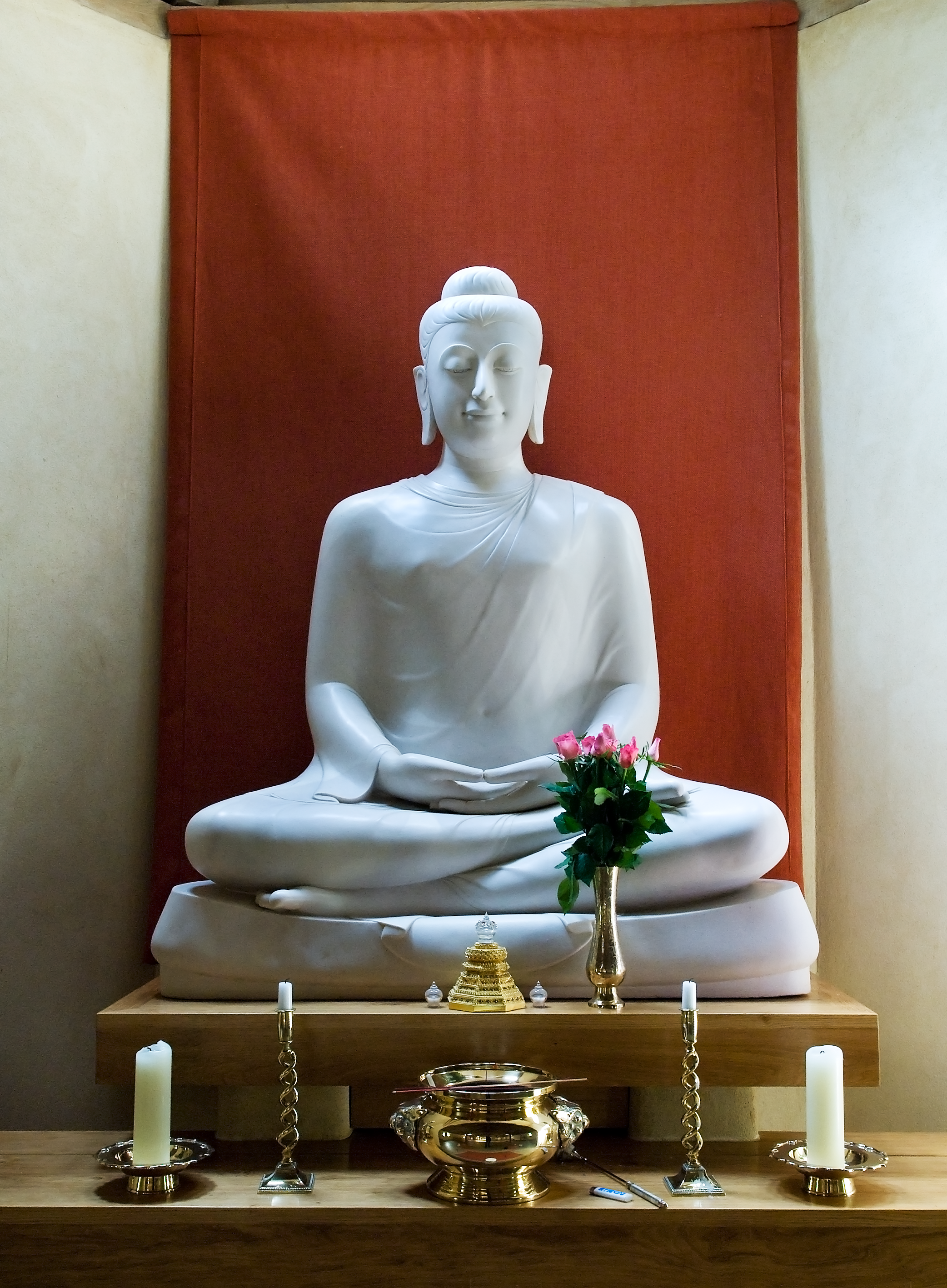
Photo from the Dhamma hall at Chithurst Buddhist Monastery

=== Foundation (1979–1984) ===
Cittaviveka is a "Forest Monastery" in the lineage of Ajahn Chah, where the emphasis is on training in terms of the precepts and renunciation established by the Vinaya (the Buddhist Monastic Code), and on a communal lifestyle. The monastery is mostly made up of woodland and heath (Hammer Wood) which has a few kutīs (huts [Thai]) for monks and nuns, but communal activities, teaching and guest accommodation are situated in two adjacent houses – Chithurst House (for men) and Āloka Cottage (for women). Hammer Wood was given to the Sangha in 1978–9, an act which precipitated the purchase of the semi-derelict Chithurst House which stood nearby. Later in 1979, another nearby cottage was purchased. This was renamed Āloka Cottage.

A small group of Bhikkhus took up residence on 22 June 1979, along with Sāmaṇera (novices) and anagārikas ["homeless ones" that is men living under the Eight Precepts.] They were soon joined by four women who took up the training as eight-precept nuns (mae-chee ["spiritual mothers"-Thai]) and who in 1983 became the first four sīladharā, ten-precept nuns. [The term means "those who uphold virtue" in Pāli.] The initial priority of the community was the repair of Chithurst House, which took about five years. Along with this was the reafforestation of Hammer Wood (which had been turned into commercial coppice after the First World War), a project which continues to this day.

In the more specifically monastic aspect of the monastery's development was the establishment of an ordination precinct (sīma) by Ven. Ānandamaitreya Mahanayaka of Sri Lanka on 3 June 1981. This coincided with the conferring of Preceptorship (Upajjhāya) on Ajahn Sumedho. This gave Ajahn Sumedho the authority to grant bhikkhu ordination (Upasampadā) and accordingly the first three candidates were ordained on 16 July 1981. Although bhikkhu ordinations had taken place in Britain before, they had taken place on temporary sīmas; the first established sīma was at Chithurst.

Ordinations took place at Cittaviveka on a yearly basis throughout the eighties, including the first sīladharā ordination in 1983, but, as the sīma is just a square on the lawn bounded by stones, when other indoor sīmas were subsequently established at Harnham (Aruna Ratanagiri) and Amaravati, these weatherproof areas were favoured. Cittaviveka will in the future establish a new sīma inside its main meditation hall.

On 1 August 1984, Ajahn Sumedho left Cittaviveka to establish Amaravati Buddhist Monastery in Hertfordshire. This was because of a felt need to provide more accommodation for the growing Orders of bhikkhus and sīladharā and also of lay people who wished to study and train under his guidance. Taking half the bhikkhu community and all the sīladharā to Amaravati, he left Ajahn Ānando, one of the original founders, to supervise Cittaviveka as Abbot.

=== Development (1984–1992) ===
Teaching meditation retreats for lay people was a key feature of Ajahn Sumedho's practice, a duty which took him away from the monastery for long periods. Ajahn Ānando also taught retreats, but also put energy into continuing the rebuilding of the monastery and training junior bhikkhus. With much of the major repairs completed by 1984, more attention was given to reafforestation; bhikkhus would also spend time on retreat in the Hammer Wood in tents and tepees or in one of two kutis that had been erected there.

A small group of sīladharā returned to Cittaviveka in 1986, and with changes in personnel, nuns have been a feature of the monastery ever since. During this period, the monastery also became more integrated into the local landscape, with the bhikkhus and sīladharā going out on alms-round on a daily basis.

=== Later years (1992–present) ===
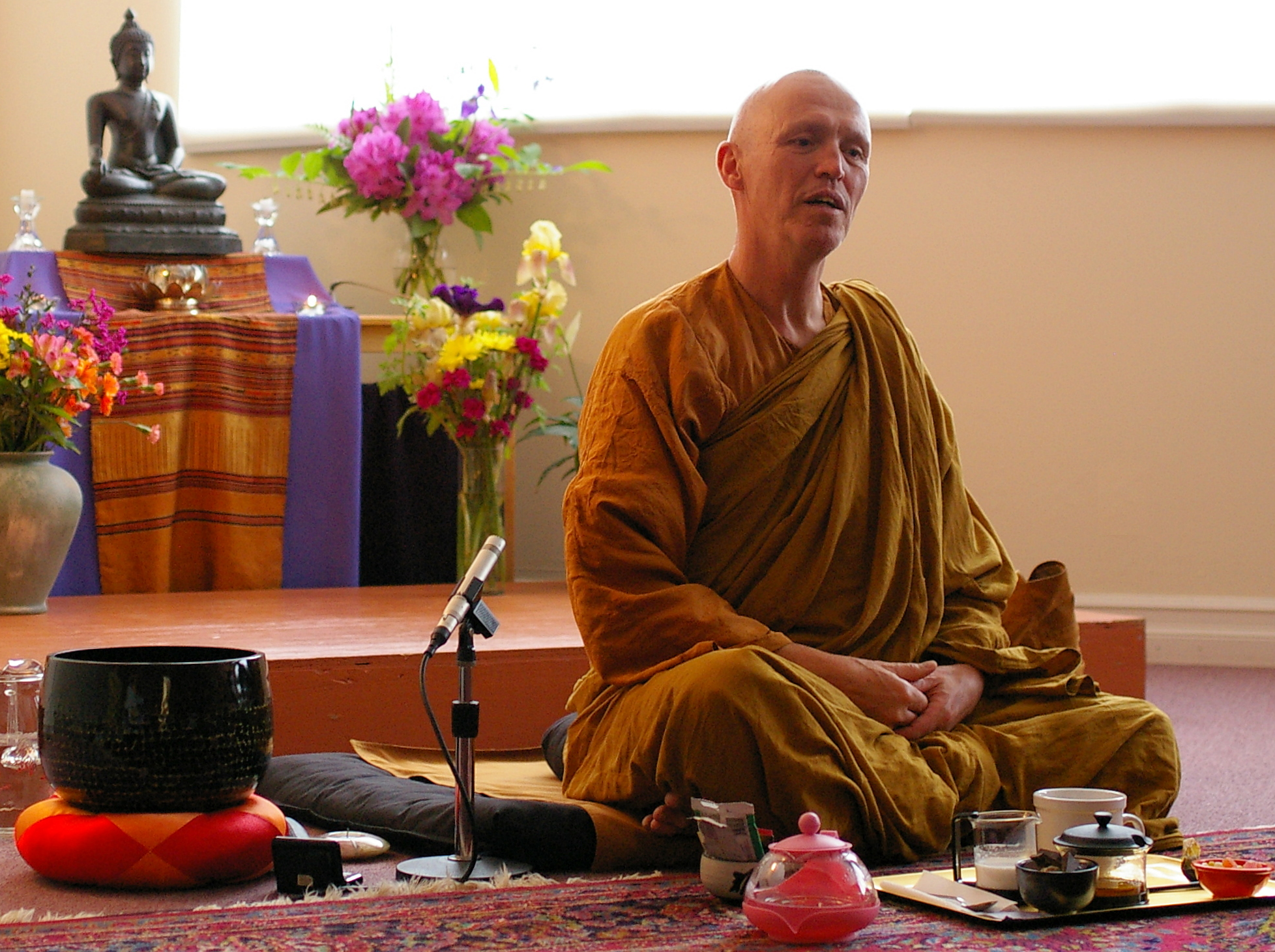
Ajahn Sucitto, abbot of Chithurst Buddhist monastery 1992–2014.

Ajahn Sucitto, another one of the original founders, became Abbot on 7 June 1992. Work on developing the monastery continued with further kutis in Hammer Wood, and then the construction of a large meditation hall (Dhamma Hall) on the site of a ruined coachhouse in the grounds of Chithurst House (1998–2004). Ajahn Sucitto stepped down in 2014 and Ajahn Karuniko was invited to take over the position of Abbot till 2019. That year Ajahn Ahimsako was asked if he would be interested in being the next Abbot of Chithurst Monastery to which he agreed.

In 2006, the English Sangha Trust purchased another house for nuns, situated opposite to Āloka and now called Rocana Vihāra. The nuns live there largely autonomous from the male monastic community.

Two or three members of the community currently go to the local towns on alms-rounds (pindapāda) for their daily meal on a couple of days of each week. The traditional wayfaring practice (tudong [Thai from Pāli "dhutanga" – "austere") of walking cross-country for several weeks, living on alms and sleeping out is also an established voluntary practice during the warmer months of the year.

== Related monasteries in the UK ==
The monastery is one of the five monasteries in the same tradition, located in England, the others being Amaravati Buddhist Monastery, Aruna Ratanagiri (Harnham Buddhist Monastery), Hartridge Buddhist Monastery, and The Forest Hermitage (Santidhamma & Bhavanadhamma).

== See also ==
- Thai Forest Tradition
- Forest Tradition of Ajahn Chah
- Wat Pah Pong, Thailand
- Wat Pah Nanachat, Thailand
- Aruna Ratanagiri
- Santacittarama, Italy
- Abhayagiri Buddhist Monastery, USA
- Birken Forest Buddhist Monastery, Canada
- Bodhinyana Monastery, Australia
- List of current places of worship in Chichester (district)
