= Wat Pah Nanachat =

Theravāda Buddhist monastery in Thailand

Coordinates: 15°09′55.00″N 104°46′34.50″E

- วัดป่านานาชาติ
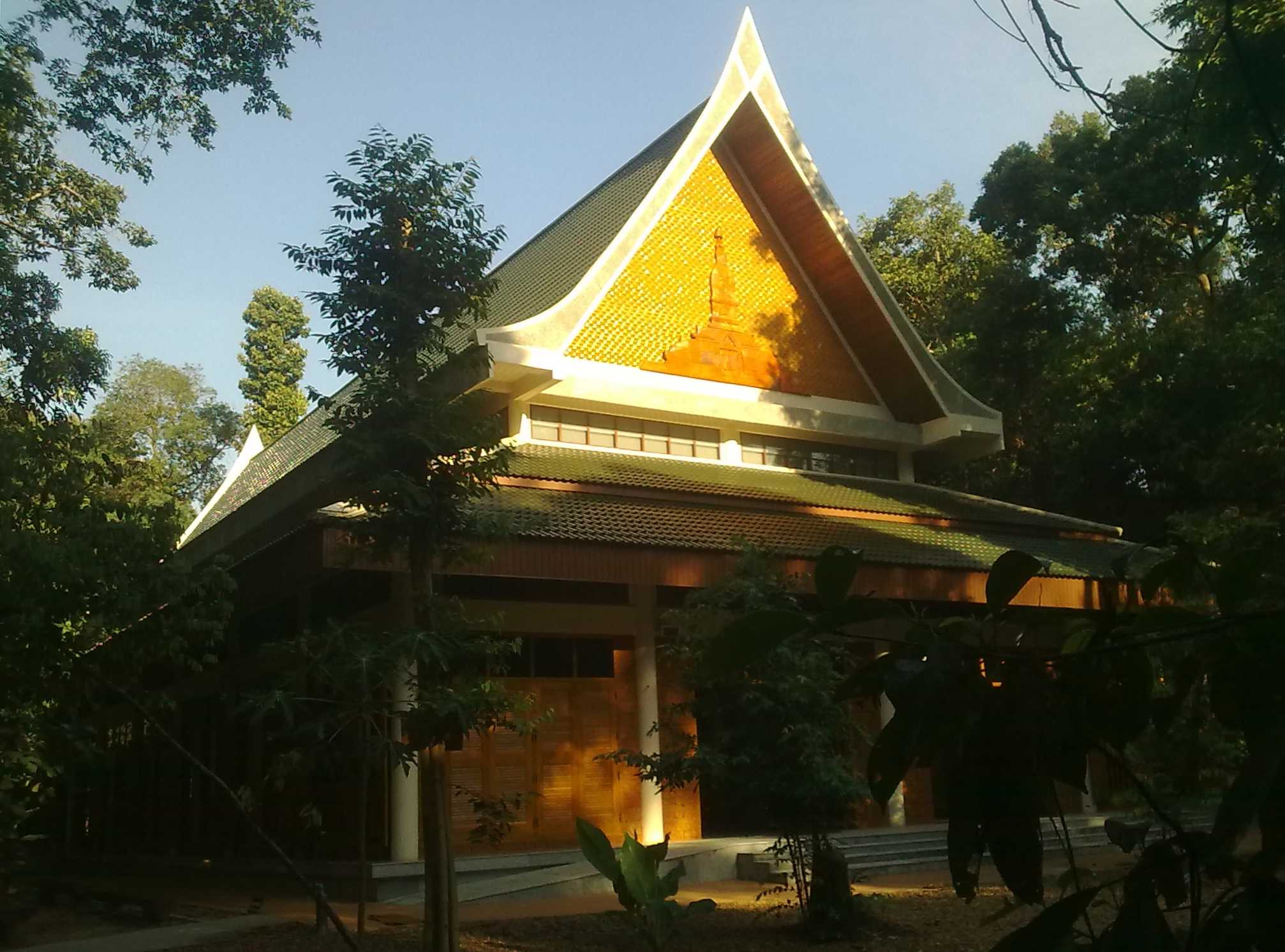

Religion
- Affiliation: Thai Forest Tradition

Location
- Location: Bung Wai, Warin Chamrap, Ubon Ratchathani
- Country: Thailand
- Interactive map of Wat Pah Nanachat

Architecture
- Founder: Ajahn Chah
- Established: 1975

Website
- watpahnanachat.org

Wat Pah Nanachat (Thai: วัดป่านานาชาติ, lit. 'International Forest Monastery') is a Theravāda Buddhist monastery in northeast Thailand, about 15 kilometres from the city of Ubon Rachathani. It was established in 1975 by Ajahn Chah as a training community for non-Thais according to the norms of the Thai Forest Tradition. Resident monks, novices and postulants include a wide range of nationalities. The primary language of communication and instruction is English.

== History ==
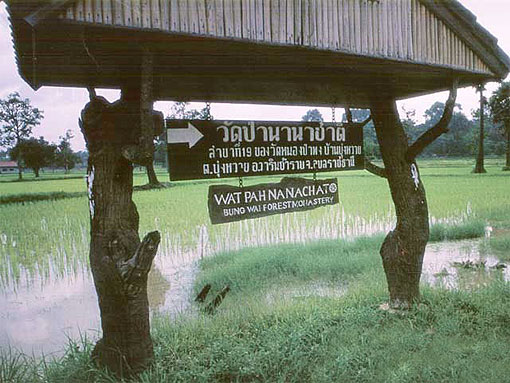
Pointing the way along the path to Wat Pa Nanachat

The monastery was founded in response to increasing international interest, particularly from the United Kingdom, in the Theravadin forest tradition of Thailand. The first abbot of Wat Pah Nanachat was Ajahn Sumedho, an American bhikkhu trained by Ajahn Chah at Wat Nong Pah Pong, the motherhouse of Wat Pah Nanachat. Today, as a consequence, students of the Thai forest tradition are found in branch monasteries around the world under the collective label of The Forest Sangha. The largest monastery of this network is Amaravati Monastery, about 30 miles north of London. Its abbot was Ajahn Sumedho, who recently relinquished the post to Ajahn Amaro (ex-co-abbot of Abhayagiri Buddhist Monastery in California).

== Meditation ==
Buddhist meditation practice of all types is encouraged at Wat Pananachat, though breathing meditation predominates. In the spirit of Ajahn Chah's teachings, vipassanā, or insight, and samatha, or tranquility, are regarded as two sides of a coin rather than two distinct categories. Lay visitors are expected to observe the eight precepts version of sila, or the practice of virtue. For monks, strict adherence to the Vinaya, the 2,500-year-old code of discipline is not only required but is the distinguishing characteristic of the lineage. For lay visitors, no formal meditation teaching is available beyond Dhamma talks and what may be derived from freely available reading matter, the priority being the formal training of the full-time mendicants.

== Visiting ==
Prospective visitors to the wat are advised to write well in advance, as facilities are somewhat limited. Men staying for more than a few days are required to shave their heads, as well as facial hair and eyebrows. Laypeople dress in modest white clothing, borrowed from the monastery if necessary. Laywomen wear black skirts with white blouses. Venerable Ajahn Kevali, the abbot since 2007, encourages a more communal atmosphere than perhaps earlier had been the case. Guests are expected to take part in all daily activities. Following is a summary of a typical daily schedule:

- 3:00 a.m. Wakeup
- 3:30 a.m. Morning meeting in the main sala (hall) for Buddhist chant
- 6:00 a.m. Sweeping the grounds – a vigorous meditative practice; laity helping in the kitchen and accompanying the monks making rounds (Pindapada) for alms
- 8:00 a.m. Dāna, offering food so collected to the monks, followed by the daily meal for others
- 9:30 a.m. Daily Dhamma reflections and advice for practice by the abbot or senior monks
- 10:00 a.m. Work period (daily chores, cleaning, or community projects)
- 11:00 a.m. Time for private meditation, all through the day
- 4:30 p.m. Tea time, brief communal meeting
- 6:15 p.m. Evening meeting in the main hall for evening chanting and communal meditation
- 7:45 p.m. Private meditation in the main Sala or back in the dwelling
- 9:30 p.m. Rest

On Observance Days (uposatha), the schedule may vary somewhat as monks and laity alike attempt to sit in meditation all through the night till 5:00 in the morning.

== Abbots ==
- Ajahn Sumedho (1975–1977)
- Ajahn Pabhakaro (1977–1979)
- Ajahn Jagaro (1979–1982)
- Ajahn Pasanno (1982–1996)
- Ajahn Jayasaro (1996–2002)
- Ajahn Nyanadhammo (2002–2007)
- Ajahn Kevali (2007–present)

== Getting there ==
The monastery is in Isaan, the north-eastern region of Thailand, in the district or amphoe of Warin Chamrap, Ubon Ratchathani Province, Tambon Bung Wai.

To Ubon Ratchathani: There are more than seven flights to Ubon from Don Mueang in Bangkok. Overnight sleeper from Bangkok, as well as other trains and buses are available. To Wat Pah Nanachat: Once in Ubon, going to Wat Pah Nanachat is straightforward and there are a few options. Any buses in Ubon bound for Si Saket drive past the Wat, simply ask the driver to be let off there. Another option is to take a bus to Warin Chamrap, where you can take a Songthaew to the Wat. It's also possible to hire a tuk-tuk or taxi to the wat from the airport, bus or train stations.

Mailing address: Wat Pah Nanachat, Bahn Bung Wai, Amphoe Warin Chamrap, Ubon Ratchathani 34310, Thailand (Thai: วัดป่านานาชาติ บ้านบุ่งหวาย อำเภอวารินชำราบ จังหวัดอุบลราชธานี ๓๔๓๑๐)

== See also ==
- Buddhism in Thailand
- Thai Forest Tradition
- Forest Tradition of Ajahn Chah
- Amaravati Buddhist Monastery, UK
- Chithurst Buddhist Monastery, UK
- Aruna Ratanagiri, UK
- Santacittarama, Italy
- Abhayagiri Buddhist Monastery, USA
- Birken Forest Buddhist Monastery, Canada
- Forest Path; A collection of talks, essays and accounts from the community at Wat Pah Nanachat
