= Amaravati Buddhist Monastery =

Theravada Buddhist monastery in England

Coordinates: 51°47′30″N 0°31′15″W

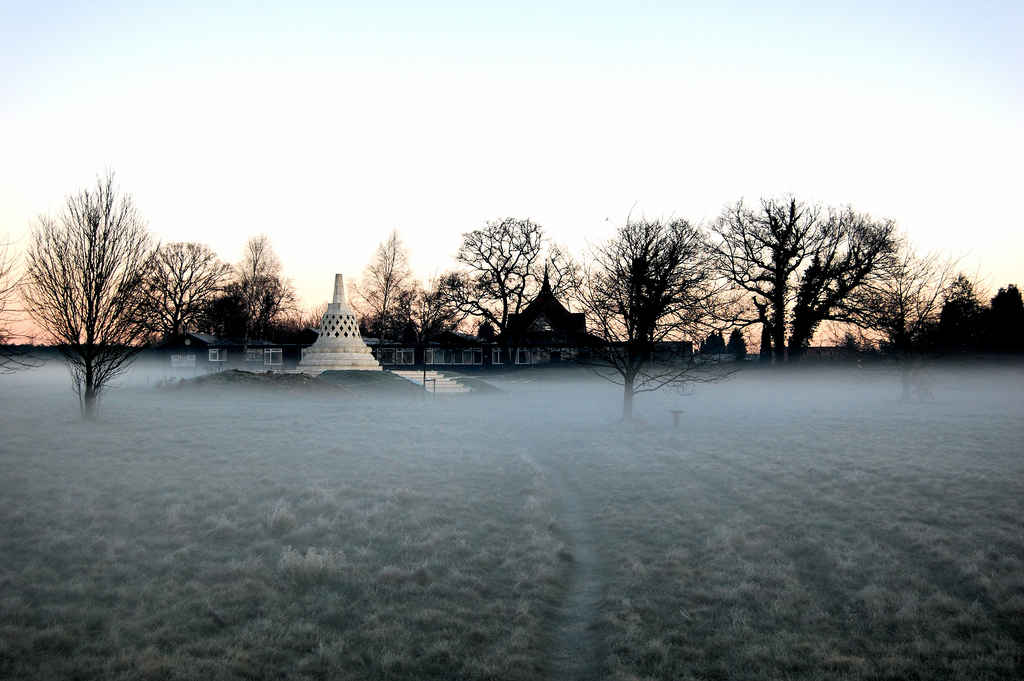
- A stupa amid the frost of late dawn

Religion
- Affiliation: Thai Forest Tradition
- Leadership: Ajahn Amaro (abbot)

Location
- Location: St Margarets Lane, Great Gaddesden, Hemel Hempstead, Hertfordshire, England HP1 3BZ
- Country: United Kingdom
- Interactive map of Amaravati Buddhist Monastery

Architecture
- Founder: disciples of Luang Por Chah
- Completed: 1984

Website
- http://www.amaravati.org

Amaravati is a Theravada Buddhist monastery at the eastern end of the Chiltern Hills in South East England. Established in 1984 by Ajahn Sumedho as an extension of Chithurst Buddhist Monastery, the monastery has its roots in the Thai Forest Tradition. It takes inspiration from the teachings of the community's founder, the late Ajahn Chah. Its chief priorities are the training and support of a resident monastic community, and the facilitation for monastic and lay people alike of the practice of the Buddha's teachings.

It is not to be confused with the ancient Amaravati Stupa in India.

== Community ==
The resident community consists of monks (bhikkhus), nuns (siladhara), and male and female postulants who live in accordance with strict traditional codes of celibacy, together with a volunteer support staff and visitors. According to the monastery website, regarding the male monastic community, "Usually, there are between 15 and 25 bhikkhus and samaneras in residence, living a contemplative, celibate, mendicant life according to the Vinaya and Dhamma. [...] The community also consists of anagārikas, or white-robed postulants on the eight precepts, who after a year or two may be given samanera ordination." The monastery's order of siladhara, or ten-precept nuns, dates from 1983; there are 10 or so members and a number of female postulants at Amaravati and at Chithurst Buddhist Monastery in West Sussex.

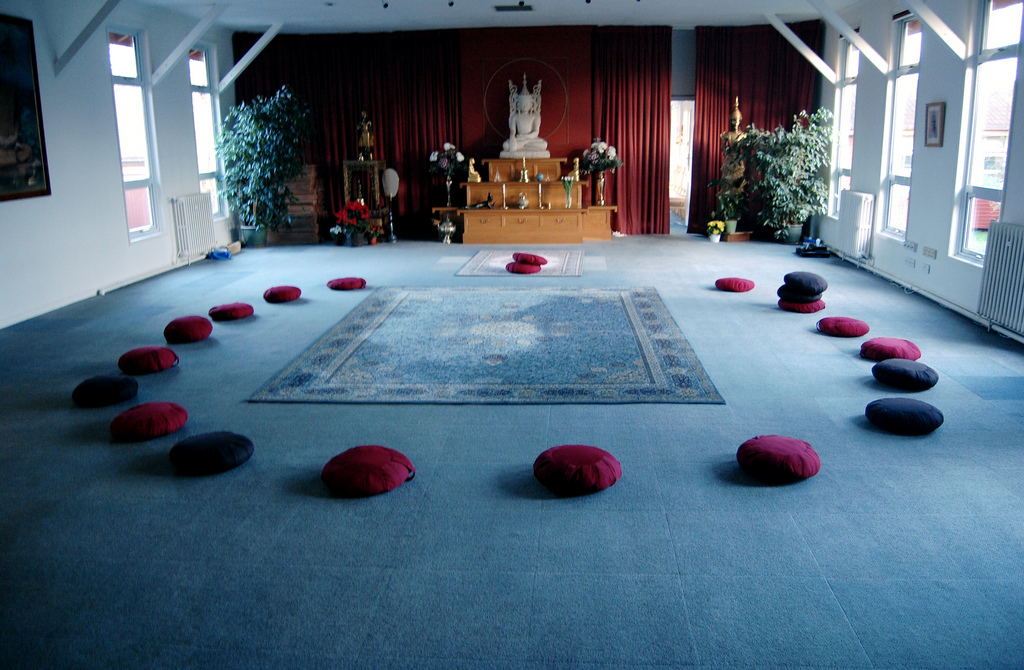
Inside Amravati Buddhist Monastery

== Origins ==
Amaravati formally opened in 1985, the site having been purchased from Buckinghamshire County Council by the English Sangha Trust the year before. Its configuration of several large huts of Canadian cedar, built in extensive grounds for military purposes during World War II, had formerly been a residential school. A purpose-built temple was officially opened on 4 July 1999 by Princess Galyani Vadhana, sister of the King of Thailand. The monastery's founder and abbot for most of its existence has been Ajahn Sumedho, Ajahn Chah's foremost disciple in the West. In Autumn 2010 he handed over to the English monk Ajahn Amaro, who for the preceding 15 years had been co-abbot of Abhayagiri Monastery in Redwood Valley, California.

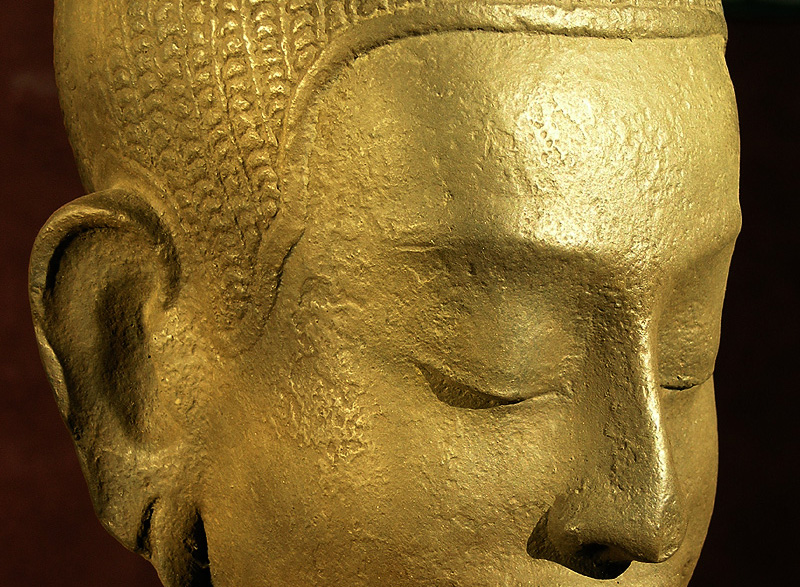
Beyond all coming and going: the Tathagata

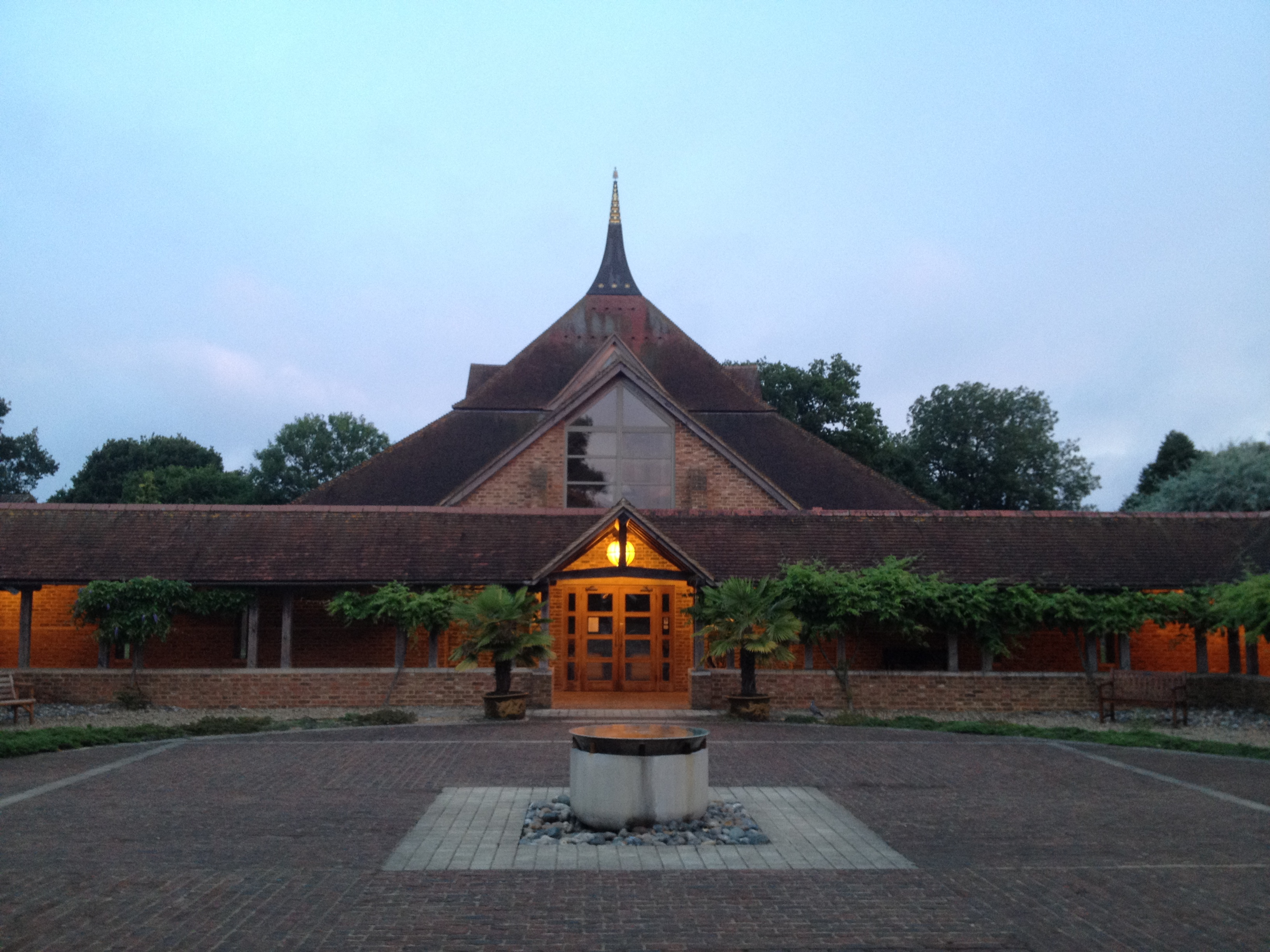
Temple of Amaravati Monastery UK seen from within cloister

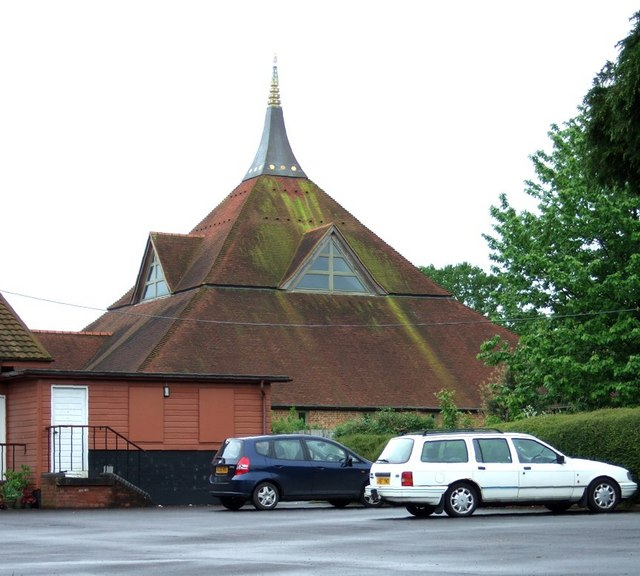
Main temple building seen from rear car park

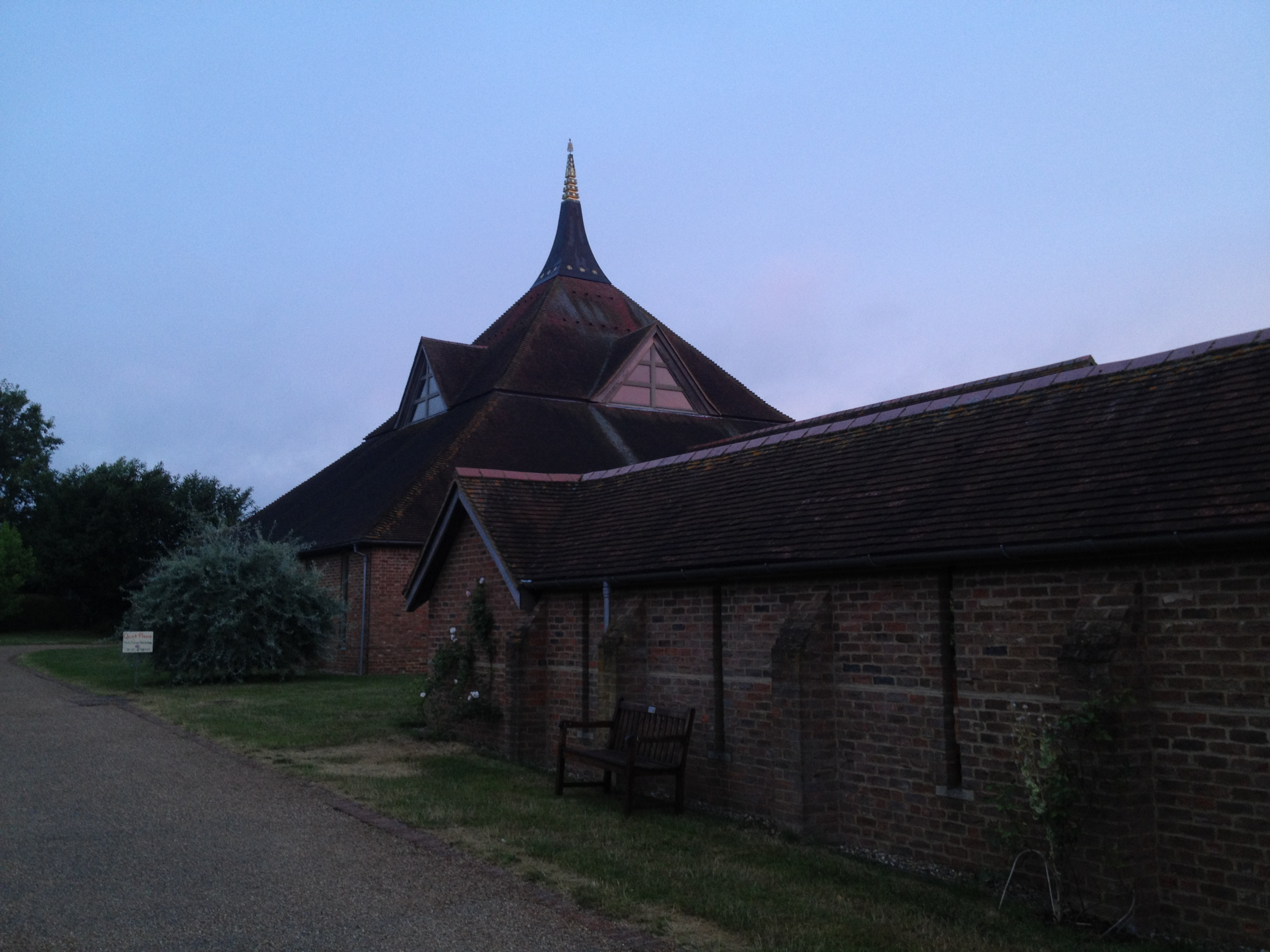
Amaravati Monastery Cloister outside wall and temple in background

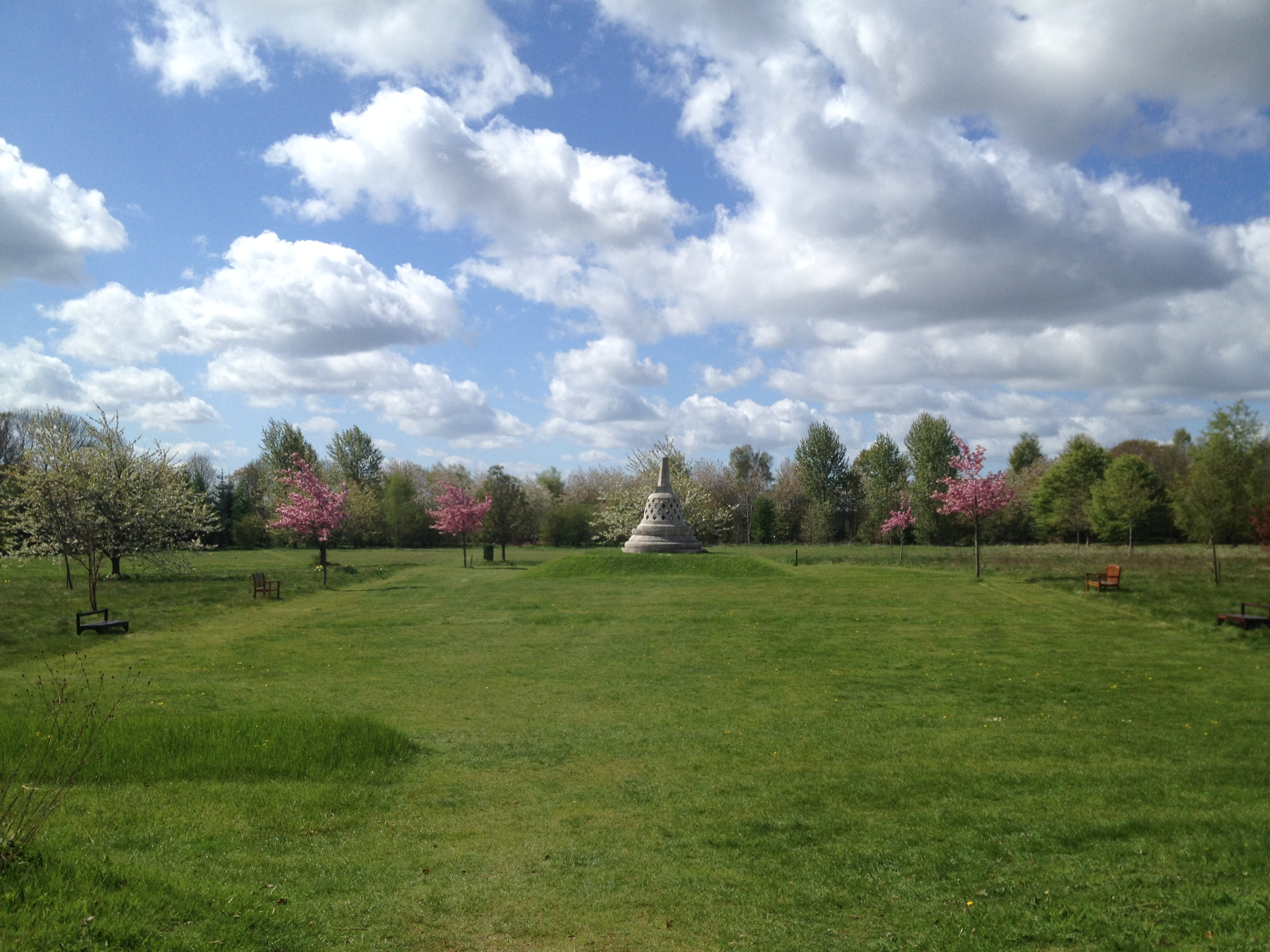
Main Stupa and trees in bloom at Amaravati Monastery UK

== Outreach ==
Amaravati has sister monasteries in England – in Devon, Northumberland and West Sussex – as well as monasteries in New Zealand, Italy, Switzerland and North America, which were likewise founded by Ajahn Sumedho. These exist among other Western branches of Ajahn Chah's community, in addition to those in Thailand (see list below). A new vihara in Portugal, called Sumedharama, has been founded north west of Lisbon, near Ericeira. Amaravati's retreat centre provides meditation courses for lay people from April to December. A meditation workshop for lay visitors happens each Saturday from 2-4pm, and there are family and other practice and teaching events happening at the monastery regularly.

In accordance with the principle of dāna established by the Buddha, the monastery and the retreat centre are run entirely on donations. Amaravati is near the Hertfordshire village of Great Gaddesden. The nearest towns are Hemel Hempstead and Berkhamsted. The mediaeval convent of St Margaret's, abolished by Henry VIII during the Dissolution of the Monasteries, was for centuries just 400 yards along the lane. Amaravati in the ancient Buddhist language of Pali means "deathless realm."

== Retreat Centre ==
The monastery includes a retreat centre offering monastic and lay retreats most of the year.

== Long Term Plans ==
In 2013, plans were unveiled to update the buildings to a more eco-friendly design, replacing some of the old wooden buildings. So far the following have been completed

- Aroga Kuti: Nursing cottage for elderly monks, completed in Nov 2017.
- Heartwood House: Increased accommodation for the nuns' community.
- Re-building of the nuns' residence at Amaravati.

== See also ==
- Thai Forest Tradition
- Forest Tradition of Ajahn Chah
- Aruna Ratanagiri, UK
- Chithurst Buddhist Monastery, UK
- Wat Pah Pong, Thailand
- Wat Pah Nanachat, Thailand
- Santacittarama, Italy
- Abhayagiri Buddhist Monastery, USA
- Birken Forest Buddhist Monastery, Canada
- Bodhinyana Monastery, Australia
- Buddhism in the West
- Buddhism in the United Kingdom
- Buddhism in Europe
