= Aruna Ratanagiri =

Theravada Buddhist monastery

Aruna Ratanagiri Buddhist Monastery

Religion
- Affiliation: Thai Forest Tradition

Location
- Location: Aruna Ratanagiri, Harnham, Belsay, Northumberland, NE20 0HF
- Country: United Kingdom

Architecture
- Founder: Venerable Ajahn Sumedho Mahathera
- Established: 1981

Website
- ratanagiri.org.uk

Aruna Ratanagiri Buddhist Monastery (Harnham Buddhist Monastery) is a Theravada Buddhist monastery of the Thai Forest Tradition in Northumberland, England. The community consists of monks, novices and postulants from a wide range of nationalities, usually numbering around eight Sangha members. The monastery includes an adjacent lay retreat facility known as Kusala House.

== History ==
The monastery was founded in response to increasing interest, particularly in northeast England, in the Thai Forest Tradition, as it was being established by Ajahn Sumedho and other disciples of Ajahn Chah in England in the late 1970s. When, in 1980, a group of local yoga students tried to find a suitable cottage which they could offer as a retreat facility to the Sangha, farmer John Wake of Harnham Hall, Harnham, near Belsay responded, and they agreed to rent one of his farm cottages. In 1981 Ajahn Sucitto (the abbot of Cittaviveka/Chithurst Buddhist Monastery 1992–2014) became the first bhikkhu to take up residence, and began initial renovations; on 21 June 1981 the monastery was officially opened by Ajahn Sumedho and in that same year the Magga Bhavaka Trust was established as a charitable trust in order to steward financial support for the new monastery (the monastery now has a new trust: Harnham Buddhist Monastery Trust).

== Vision ==
The primary focus for Aruna Ratanagiri monastery is to provide and maintain a sanctuary suitable for the training and ongoing practice of Theravada bhikkhus, in keeping with the Pali Vinaya and forest tradition of Northeast Thailand.

Today, through freely distributed books and Dhamma talks, regular discussion groups and Sunday evening talks, and also in the context of more than five times yearly meditation retreats, Harnham offers spiritual support for practitioners far and wide. Monks from Harnham regularly visit affiliated Buddhist meditation groups in the north east of England and Scotland. In addition, a lot of non-Buddhist groups and individual visitors, including school and university groups, come to the monastery to learn about Buddhism.

== Abbots ==
- Ajahn Sucitto (1981–1981)
- Ajahn Viradhammo (1981–1983)
- Ajahn Anando (1983–1984)
- Ajahn Thiradhammo (1984–1987)
- Ajahn Pabhakaro (1987–1990)
- Ajahn Munindo (1991 – present)

== See also ==
- Thai Forest Tradition
- Forest Tradition of Ajahn Chah
- Ajahn Chah
- Ajahn Sucitto
- Ajahn Amaro
- Ajahn Viradhammo
- Wat Nong Pah Pong, Thailand
- Wat Pah Nanachat, Thailand
- Amaravati Buddhist Monastery, UK
- Chithurst Buddhist Monastery, UK
- Santacittarama, Italy
