= Viveka =

Sanskrit and Pali term for discernment or discrimination

Viveka (Sanskrit: विवेक, romanized: viveka) is a Sanskrit and Pali term translated into English as discernment or discrimination. In the Vedanta, viveka is considered to be the first requirement of the spiritual journey, the next being vairagya (detachment), as a natural extension of viveka. Advaita Vedanta Darshana interprets viveka as discrimination between the real (Satya) and the unreal (asatya). Visistadvaita Vedanta Darshana interprets viveka as discrimination of food.

== Advaita Interpretation ==
According to Rao and Paranjpe, viveka can be understood as the sense of discrimination or wisdom: discrimination between the real and the unreal, between the self and the non-self, between the permanent and the impermanent; discriminative inquiry; right intuitive discrimination. Viveka also means the power of distinguishing the invisible Brahman from the visible world, a faculty that enables the classification of things according to their real properties. It is an antidote to avidya which is the root cause of all suffering. Viveka can be cultivated by association with Jnanis and saints, the study of Vedanta literature, meditation, and by separating oneself from the senses.

In the Advaita tradition, the Vivekachudamani (attributed to Adi Shankara) is a pedagogical treatise in poetic form that addresses the development of viveka in the spititual aspirant. Much of the work is in the form of a dialogue between a student and a spiritual master. It expounds the nondualist approach to discernment of the real (eternal and unchanging) and unreal (temporal and changing), purusha (consciousness) and prakriti (matter or energy), and the ultimate unity of atman (individual essence) and Brahman (universal essence).

Viveka is the basis of the monastic name of Swami Vivekananda, the late 19th century Indian saint and spiritual teacher who first brought the Advaita philosophy to the West. The name "Vivekananda" is a conglomerate of viveka and ānanda, meaning "the bliss of discerning wisdom". The name was suggested by his patron, friend and disciple Raja Ajit Singh of Khetri in 1893, just before the Swami left for his first visit to America.

== Visistadvaita Interpretation ==
According to Ramanujacharya of the Sri Vaishnava Visistadvaita tradition, viveka refers to discrimination in relation to food-taking, with the purpose of minimizing the individual's subjection to the senses and refining the capacity to go beyond them towards God. Food contains all the energies that make up the forces of our body and mind and the material particles of the food eaten construct the instrument of thought. There are certain kinds of food that produce a certain change in the mind and the body. According to Ramanuja, the following three things in food must be avoided by Bhaktas:

- In terms of Jati (the nature or species of the food), meat should be avoided as it is impure by its nature. It can be obtained only by taking the life of another creature. It demoralizes other human beings by creating a class of cruel humans in society that need to engage in the occupation of killing other creatures. Overly stimulating foods, such as onions, and garlic, unpleasant-smelling foods such as sauerkraut, any food that has been standing for days till its condition is changed, and any food whose natural juices have been almost dried up, should also be avoided.
- In terms of Ashraya (the person from whom food comes), care must be taken as to who touches the food to ensure that a wicked or immoral person has not touched it. The idea is that each person has a certain aura around them and whatever thing they touch, a part of their character and influence is left on it.
- In terms of Nimitta (instruments and physical impurities), dirt, dust, saliva and other secretions, must not be in food. All items used in food should be washed before cooking. The lips ought never to be touched with the fingers. Food partially eaten by someone else should not be eaten.

When these things are avoided, food becomes pure. Ramanuja quotes Chandogya Upanishad: "If one eats pure food, one’s mind becomes pure. If the mind is pure, one’s memory becomes strong and steady. If the memory is good, one becomes free from all bondages and mind is a constant memory of God".

== See also ==
- Vichara
- Cittaviveka Monastery
