= Santacittārāma =

Italian Theravada Buddhist monastery

Santacittārāma Buddhist Monastery
- Monastero Buddhista Santacittārāma
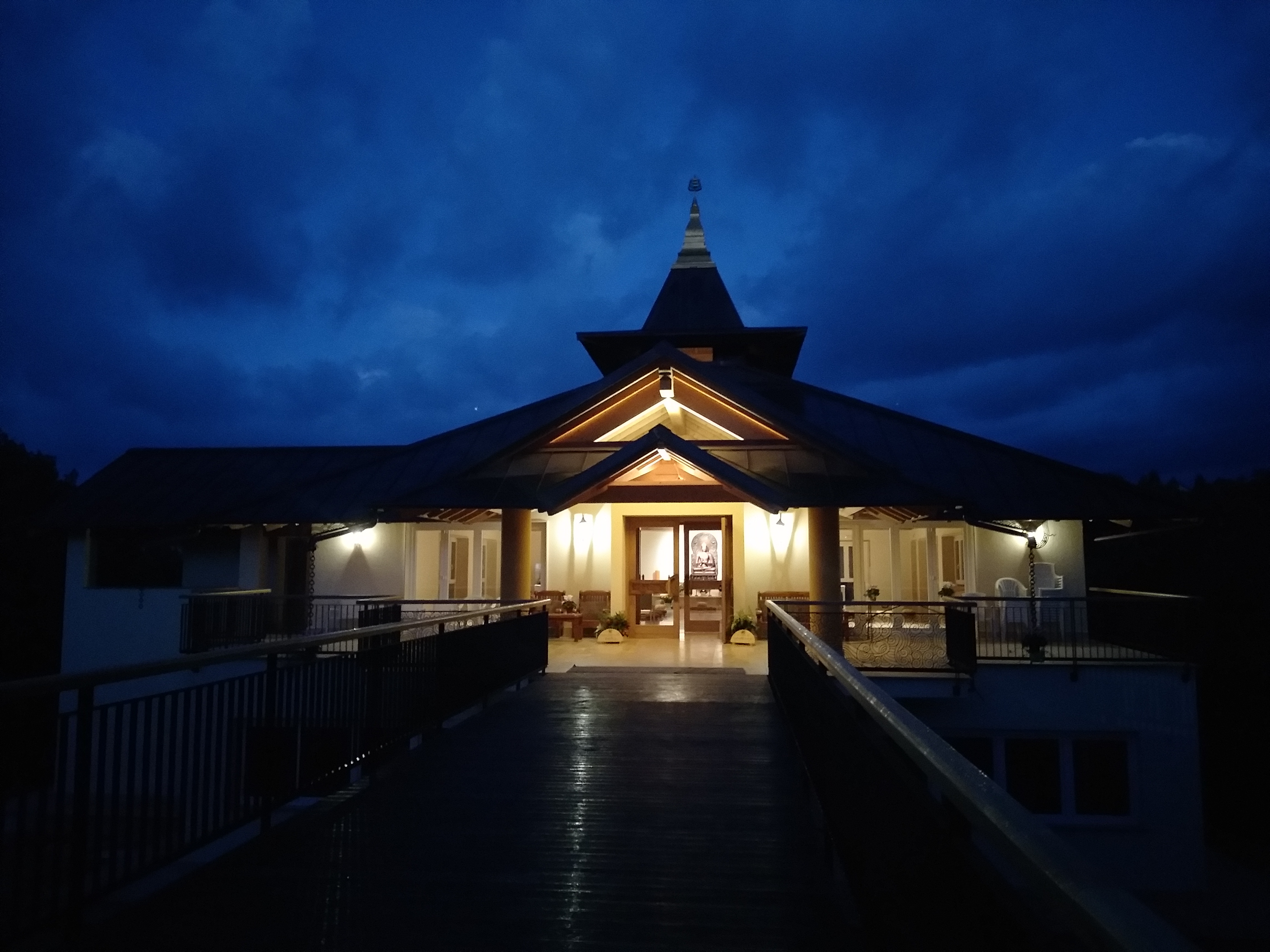

Religion
- Affiliation: Buddhism
- Sect: Theravāda
- Province: Rieti
- Region: Latium
- Ecclesiastical or organizational status: Forest monastery
- Leadership: Ven. Chandapālo

Location
- Municipality: Poggio Nativo
- Country: Italy

Architecture
- Established: 1990 (in Sezze)

Website
- www.santacittarama.org

Santacittārāma is the name of the Italian Theravada Buddhist monastery in the Thai Forest Tradition lineage of Ajahn Chah located near Rome. In the spring of 1990 the Italian Bhikkhu Ajahn Thanavaro (later Mario Thanavaro) and then Anagārika John Angelori were sent by Ajahn Sumedho to take up residence in a small house outside the village of Sezze south of Rome. Later, with an important contribution from the Thai community, a more suitable location was found in Poggio Nativo in the countryside of Sabina. and a larger monastery was established in 1997 with separate buildings for visitors and Kutis in the woods for residents and visiting Bhikkhus. Mrs. Natchari Thananan, the wife of the Thai Ambassador to Italy, Anurak Thananan, was instrumental in raising funds for this monastery. Some years later the Santacittārāma Association acquired an adjoining property, with a building used mainly to accommodate elderly monks (Nirodha), and a large Temple was constructed.

== Sangha composition as of Aug. 2024 ==
- Ajahn Chandapālo (British / Italian) - Abbot
- Ajahn Preechar Jutindharo (Thai / Italian)
- Ajahn Ko Suvaco (Thai)
- Ajahn Mahapañño (Italian)
- Ajahn Ice Pabhakaro (Thai)
- Ajahn Knight Varamangalo (Thai)
- Bhikkhu Mahabodhi (Italian)
- Bhikkhu Jayaviro (Italian)
- Bhikkhu Santidharo (Italian)
- Bhikkhu Khemaviro (Swedish)
- Bhikkhu Thanadhammo (Italian)
- Bhikkhu Dhammatejo (Italian)
- Bhikkhu Ariyacitto (Italian)
- Bhikkhu Thitapemo (Italian)
- Samanera Jayamangalo (Italian)
- Samanera Dhiracitto (Slovenian)
- Anagarika Filippo (Italian)

== See also ==
- Thai Forest Tradition
- Ajahn Chah
- Ajahn Sumedho
- Wat Pah Pong, Thailand
- Wat Pah Nanachat, Thailand
- Amaravati Buddhist Monastery, UK
- Chithurst Buddhist Monastery, UK
- Aruna Ratanagiri, UK
- Abhayagiri Buddhist Monastery, USA
- Bodhinyana Monastery, Australia
- Birken Forest Buddhist Monastery, Canada
