= Wat Nong Pah Pong =

Theravāda Buddhist monastery in Thailand

Coordinates: 15°09′32.60″N 104°49′40.60″E

- วัดหนองป่าพง
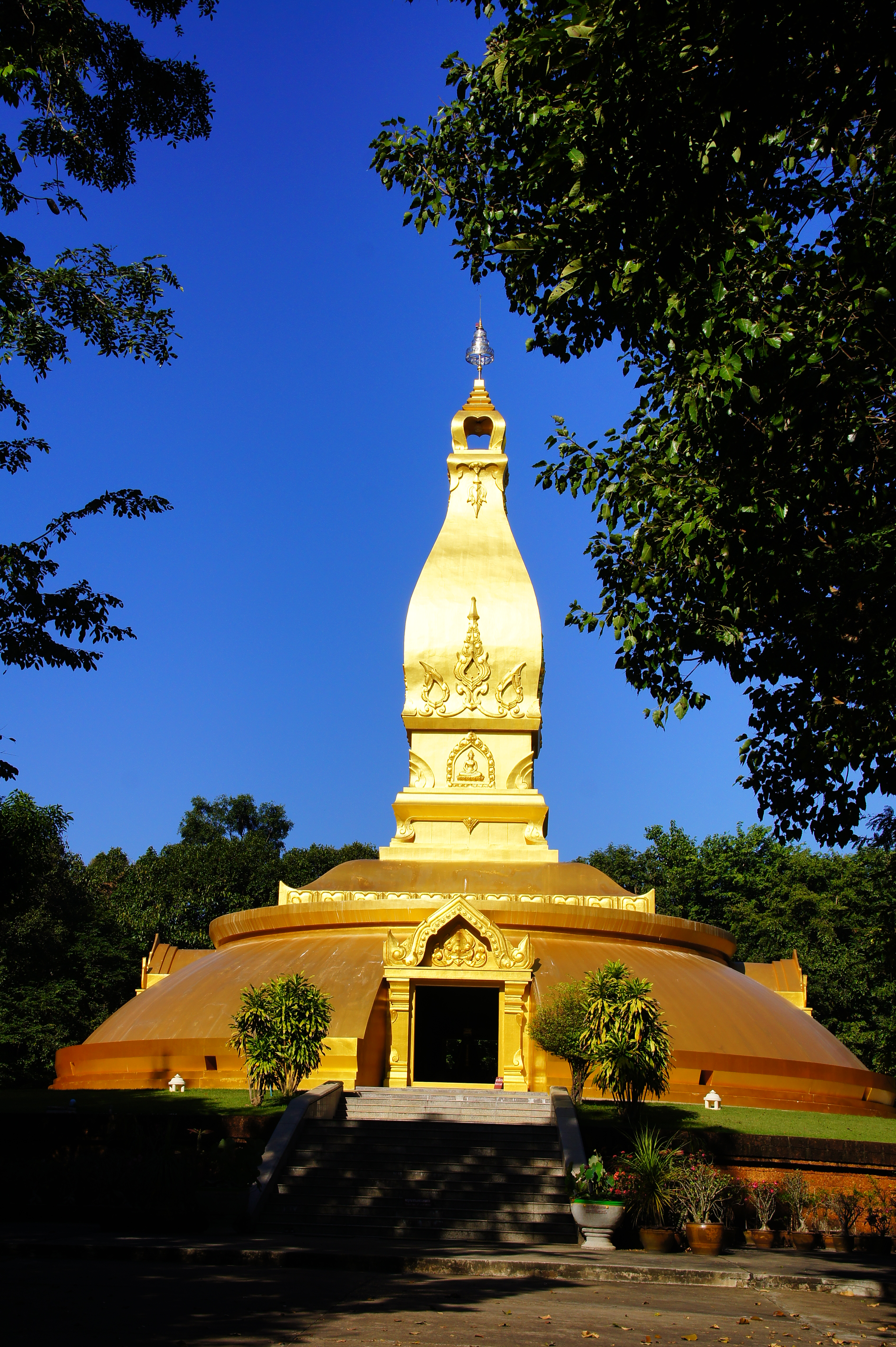

Religion
- Affiliation: Thai Forest Tradition

Location
- Country: Thailand
- Interactive map of Wat Nong Pah Pong

Architecture
- Founder: Ajahn Chah

Website
- watnongpahpong.org

Wat Nong Pah Pong (Thai: วัดหนองป่าพง; generally shortened to Wat Pah Pong) is a Theravāda Buddhist monastery in Warin Chamrap, Ubon Ratchathani, Thailand. It was established by the late Ajahn Chah as the main monastery of the Thai Forest Tradition.

== International Branch Monasteries ==
In 1975, one of Ajahn Chah's first Western disciples, Ajahn Sumedho, opened what was to be the first in a long line of branch monasteries (currently around 240 branches) of Wat Nong Pah Pong specifically geared towards the growing interest in traditional Buddhist practices among Westerners. The Thai monastery Wat Pah Nanachat, along with a growing list of monasteries, opened in recent years around the world, are introducing the heart of the Buddhist teachings to what was previously something of an inaccessible audience to the Thai Forest masters.

Following is an incomplete list of International branch monasteries and associated monasteries of Wat Nong Pah Pong, sorted alphabetically by country:

- Australia
  - Bodhivana Monastery in Victoria
  - Bodhisaddha Forest Monastery near Sydney (Associated Monastery)
  - Bodhipāla Monastery near Adelaide (Associated Monastery)
  - Dhammagiri Forest Monastery near Brisbane, Queensland (Associated Monastery)
  - Vimokkharam Forest Hermitage near Melbourne, Victoria (Associated Monastery)
  - Wat Buddha Dhamma in New South Wales, near Sydney (Associated Monastery)
- Brazil
  - Suddhavāri Monastery in São Lourenço, MG (Associated Monastery)
- Canada
  - Arrow River Forest Hermitage in Thunder Bay, Ontario (Associated Monastery)
  - Birken Forest Buddhist Monastery in Knutsford, BC (Associated Monastery)
  - Tisarana Buddhist Monastery in Perth, Ontario
- Germany
  - Muttodaya Monastery near Nuernberg (Associated Monastery)
- Italy
  - Santacittarama in Rieti
- New Zealand
  - Bodhinyanarama Forest Monastery in Wellington
  - Vimutti Forest Monastery in Bombay
- Norway
  - Lokuttara Vihara (Skiptvet Buddhist Monastery) near Oslo (Associated Monastery)
- Portugal
  - Sumedharama in Ericeira
- Switzerland
  - Kloster Dhammapala in Kandersteg
- Thailand
  - Wat Pah Nanachat in Ubon Rachathani
- United Kingdom
  - Amaravati Buddhist Monastery in Hertfordshire
  - Aruna Ratanagiri Buddhist Monastery in Northumberland
  - Chithurst Buddhist Monastery in Hampshire
  - The Forest Hermitage in Warwickshire
  - Hartridge Buddhist Monastery in Devon
- United States of America
  - Abhayagiri Buddhist Monastery in Redwood Valley, California
  - Pacific Hermitage near Portland Oregon (Associated Monastery)
  - Temple Forest Monastery (Jetavana) near Boston

== Sources ==
- Official homepage (Thai)
- Official homepage (English index)
- The Forest Sangha
- Forest Wisdom
- Freely available publications of Ajahn Chah and his disciples in English
