= Buddhism in England =

Historical Population
| Year | Pop. | ±% |
|---|---|---|
| 2001 | 139,046 | — |
| 2011 | 238,626 | +71.6% |
| 2021 | 262,433 | +10.0% |
Religious Affiliation was not recorded prior to 2001.

Buddhism in England has growing support. 238,626 people in England declared themselves to be Buddhist at the 2011 Census and 34% of them lived in London.

== History ==
Early Buddhist presence could be seen in the 1810s. Adam Sri Munni Ratna, a Buddhist monk from Ceylon (Sri Lanka), travelled to England with his cousin (also a Buddhist monk) while accompanying Sir Alexander Johnston in 1818. They were keen to learn Christianity as they were travelling to England. During their brief stay, the two monks were baptised and returned to Ceylon where they entered government service.

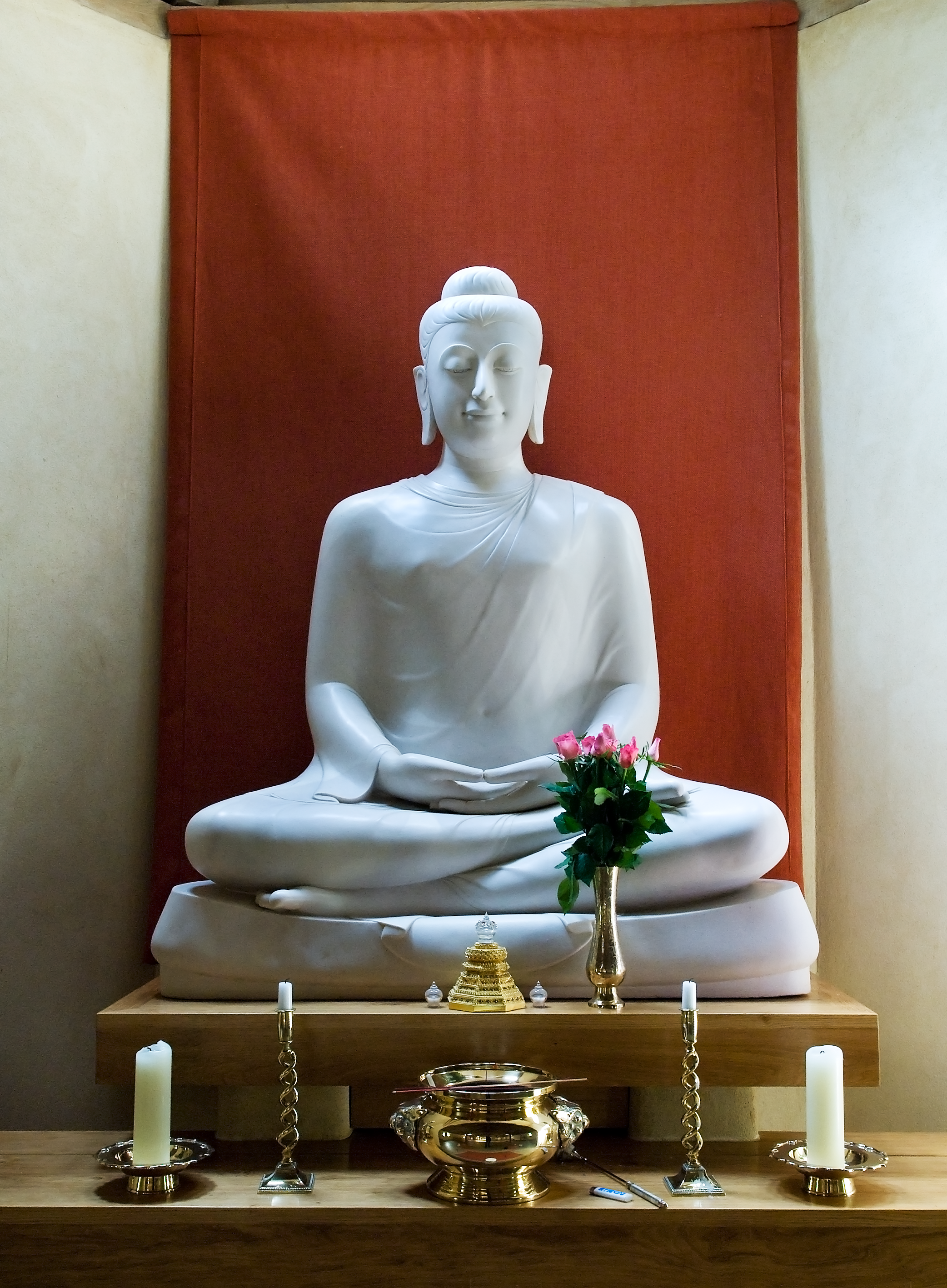
Dhamma hall at Chithurst Buddhist Monastery

Theravada influences grew in England during the early 20th century. A few of the significant events were the foundation of London’s Buddhist Society in 1924 and the Theravada London Buddhist Vihara in Chiswick in 1926. Anagarika Dharmapala (1864-1933), the founder of the Mahā Bodhi Society in 1891, was instrumental in presenting Buddhism as a living monastic tradition to the UK. The return of Ananda Metteyya to England on 23 April 1908 after travels in Ceylon and monk ordination in Burma was another significant milestone in the legacy of British Buddhism. A slow trickle from United Kingdom travelled to Asia for deeper spiritual commitment via monastic ordination, mainly as Theravadin monks, like Ñāṇavīra Thera and Ñāṇamoli Bhikkhu who went to Island Hermitage in Sri Lanka for their Sāmaṇera ordination in 1949. Kapilavaddho Bhikkhu introduced the Dhammakaya tradition to the UK in 1954 in this way and founded the English Sangha Trust in 1955. Several notable Asian monks like Hammalawa Saddhatissa came to live in England.

The Manjushri Institute, a large Buddhist college at Conishead Priory in Cumbria, was founded under the guidance of the Tibetan Gelugpa monk Thubten Yeshe in 1976. In 1991, it was subsumed by the New Kadampa Tradition, a new religious movement founded by another monk, Kelsang Gyatso.

A Theravada monastic order following the Thai Forest Tradition of Ajahn Chah was established at Chithurst Buddhist Monastery in West Sussex in 1979, giving rise to branch monasteries elsewhere in the country, including the Amaravati Buddhist Monastery in the Chiltern Hills and Aruna Ratanagiri in Northumberland. Quite a number of locals like Ajahn Khemadhammo, Ajahn Sucitto, Ajahn Amaro, Ajahn Brahm and Ajahn Jayasaro were ordained into this monastic order, become serious practitioners and dedicated Dhamma teachers. Ajahn Khemadhammo also began Buddhist prison chaplaincy work in 1977 and established "Angulimala, the Buddhist Prison Chaplaincy" in 1985. A lay meditation tradition of Thai origin is represented by the Samatha Trust, with its headquarters cum retreat centre in Wales. Sōtō Zen has a priory at Throssel Hole Buddhist Abbey in Northumberland.

There are now many Buddhist groups in England. To name a few from the Tibetan Tradition there are Sanghas of: Rigpa, Karma Kagyu, Dechen, and Aro gTér

The Dalai Lama visited Aldershot in both 2010 and 2015, on the latter occasion formally opening the Aldershot Buddhist Centre.

New religious movements present in England include Tiratna (FWBO), Diamond Way, New Kadampa Tradition and True Buddha School. In 1967, Englishman Sangharakshita (1925-2018), who had spent time in the east as a Theravadin monk, founded the Friends of the Western Buddhist Order (later renamed Triratna Buddhist Community). Diamond Way, is a new religious movement founded by Danish man Ole Nydahl,

== Demographics ==
=== Geographical Distribution ===
In 2001 Buddhism constituted 0.3% of the population of England, which increased to 0.5% in 2011 census. According to the 2011 census, there are 238,626 Buddhists in England.

The district with the highest proportion of Buddhists at the 2011 Census was Rushmoor in Hampshire, with 3.3% of respondents identifying as Buddhist: this is mainly due to the area's (specifically Aldershot's) historic ties with the Gurkha regiment.

Buddhists in England by Region
| Region | 2021 | | 2011 | | 2001 | |
| Region | Number | % | Number | % | Number | % |
|---|---|---|---|---|---|---|
| Greater London | 77,425 | 0.9% | 82,026 | 1.0% | 54,297 | 0.8% |
| South East | 54,433 | 0.6% | 43,946 | 0.5% | 22,005 | 0.3% |
| East | 26,814 | 0.4% | 22,273 | 0.4% | 12,065 | 0.2% |
| South West | 24,579 | 0.4% | 19,730 | 0.4% | 11,299 | 0.2% |
| North West | 23,028 | 0.3% | 20,695 | 0.3% | 11,794 | 0.2% |
| West Midlands | 18,804 | 0.3% | 16,649 | 0.3% | 9,760 | 0.2% |
| Yorkshire and the Humber | 15,803 | 0.3% | 14,319 | 0.3% | 7,188 | 0.1% |
| East Midlands | 14,521 | 0.3% | 12,672 | 0.3% | 7,541 | 0.2% |
| North East | 7,026 | 0.3% | 6,316 | 0.2% | 3,097 | 0.1% |
| England | 262,433 | 0.5% | 238,626 | 0.5% | 139,046 | 0.3% |

=== Ethnic group ===
Buddhists in England by Ethnic group
| Ethnic group | 2001 | | 2011 | | 2021 | |
| Ethnic group | Number | % | Number | % | Number | % |
| Asian | 47,082 | 33.86 | 144,044 | 60.36 | 154,531 | 58.88 |
|---|---|---|---|---|---|---|
| – Chinese | 33,394 | 24.02 | 47,809 | 20.04 | 41,014 | 15.63 |
| – Indian | 1,862 | 1.34 | 3,577 | 1.50 | 3,504 | 1.34 |
| – Pakistani | 181 | 0.13 | 695 | 0.29 | 221 | 0.08 |
| – Bangladeshi | 166 | 0.12 | 524 | 0.22 | 489 | 0.19 |
| – Other Asian | 11,479 | 8.26 | 91,439 | 38.32 | 109,303 | 41.65 |
| White | 52,664 | 37.88 | 78,659 | 32.96 | 81,865 | 31.19 |
| – British | 47,218 | 33.96 | 67,797 | 28.41 | 70,110 | 26.72 |
| – Irish | 1,159 | 0.83 | 1,460 | 0.61 | 1,682 | 0.64 |
| – Irish Traveller | | | 397 | 0.17 | 328 | 0.12 |
| – Roma | | | | | 361 | 0.14 |
| – Other White | 4,287 | 3.08 | 9,005 | 3.77 | 9,384 | 3.58 |
| Mixed | 4,531 | 3.26 | 9,585 | 4.02 | 10,589 | 4.03 |
| – White and Asian | 1,801 | 1.30 | 5,615 | 2.35 | 6,396 | 2.44 |
| – White and Black Caribbean | 500 | 0.36 | 992 | 0.42 | 1,130 | 0.43 |
| – White and Black African | 457 | 0.33 | 443 | 0.19 | 521 | 0.20 |
| – Other Mixed | 1,773 | 1.28 | 2,535 | 1.06 | 2,542 | 0.97 |
| Black | 1,494 | 1.07 | 2,775 | 1.16 | 2,307 | 0.88 |
| – Caribbean | 970 | 0.70 | 1,135 | 0.48 | 1,236 | 0.47 |
| – African | 338 | 0.24 | 912 | 0.38 | 667 | 0.25 |
| – Other Black | 186 | 0.13 | 728 | 0.31 | 404 | 0.15 |
| Other | 33,275 | 23.93 | 3,563 | 1.46 | 13,141 | 5.01 |
| – Arab | | | 388 | 0.13 | 125 | 0.05 |
| – Other Ethnic group | 33,275 | 23.93 | 3,175 | 1.33 | 13,016 | 4.96 |
| TOTAL | 139,046 | 100.0 | 238,626 | 100.0 | 262,433 | 100.0 |

== See also ==
- Buddhism in Scotland
- Buddhism in Wales
- Buddhism in the United Kingdom

People

- Ajahn Amaro
- Ajahn Jayasāro
- Ajahn Khemadhammo
- Ajahn Sucitto
- Ajahn Sumedho
- Hammalawa Saddhatissa
- Ñāṇamoli Bhikkhu
- Ñāṇavīra Thera

Locations

- Amaravati Buddhist Monastery
- Aruna Ratanagiri
- Dhamma Talaka Pagoda
- London Buddhist Centre
- London Fo Guang Shan Temple
- Wat Buddhapadipa

Organisations

- Pali Text Society

== Sources ==
- Bluck, Robert (2006). British Buddhism: Teachings, Practice and Development. Routledge. ISBN 978-1-134-15817-1.
