= Ajahn Kovilo =

American Theravada Buddhist monk, co-founder of Clear Mountain Monastery

- Title: Co-abbot of Clear Mountain Monastery

Personal life
- Born: Ohio, United States
- Education: Hampshire College (attended); Dharma Realm Buddhist University (bachelor's)
- Occupation: Buddhist monk, translator
- Website: www.clearmountain.org

Religious life
- Religion: Buddhism
- School: Theravada
- Lineage: Forest Tradition of Ajahn Chah
- Dharma name: Kovilo; Zhida (知達)

Senior posting
- Teacher: Ajahn Pasanno, Ajahn Amaro
- Based in: Clear Mountain Monastery, North Bend, Washington, US

Ajahn Kovilo is an American Theravada Buddhist monk of the Thai Forest Tradition, co-founder and co-abbot of Clear Mountain Monastery in North Bend, Washington. He is a translator and editor of Buddhist texts and an instructor in the Sam Harris meditation app Waking Up.

== Biography ==
Born in Ohio and raised in a Unitarian family, Kovilo began reading spiritual literature on his own at eighteen, moving from Mahatma Gandhi and Henry David Thoreau to the Bhagavad Gita and the Dhammapada. He attended Hampshire College in Massachusetts, where his favorite course was a world religions class on religious experience and literary form.

At twenty-one, in 2003, he attended his first ten-day Goenka Vipassana retreat, which he later described as having "turbocharged" his spiritual inclination, and he eventually dropped out of university to pursue monastic life. He entered the monastery in 2006 and received full ordination in 2010 from Ajahn Pasanno and Ajahn Amaro at Abhayagiri Buddhist Monastery in California. He spent the next decade training in Ajahn Chah monasteries in the United States and Thailand, completing all levels of the Nak-Tham exams in Thai, and in 2020 spent a year at a monastery of the Pa Auk tradition.

In 2020 he enrolled in the bachelor's program of the Dharma Realm Buddhist University (DRBU) in California, where he studied Pali and Mahayana traditions and received the Chinese Dharma name Zhida (知達) from Bhikkhu Bodhi.

In 2021 Kovilo joined fellow monk Ajahn Nisabho in founding Clear Mountain Monastery in the Seattle area, serving as co-abbot. The monastery, which moved to a ninety-acre property in North Bend in 2026, follows the Thai forest tradition of Ajahn Chah.

== Translation work ==
Kovilo served as editor of Stillness Flowing: The Life and Teachings of Ajahn Chah (2018), by Ajahn Jayasāro, and of Gold Wrapped in Rags: Autobiography of Ajaan Jia Cundo, by Ajaan Dick Sīlaratano, and is the compiler and translator of Thus Should You Train Yourselves and The Wellbeing Cascade.

== See also ==
- Clear Mountain Monastery
- Ajahn Nisabho
- Thai Forest Tradition
