= Ajahn Nisabho =

American Theravada Buddhist monk, co-founder of Clear Mountain Monastery

- Title: Co-abbot of Clear Mountain Monastery

Personal life
- Born: San Francisco, California, United States
- Occupation: Buddhist monk
- Website: www.clearmountain.org

Religious life
- Religion: Buddhism
- School: Theravada
- Lineage: Forest Tradition of Ajahn Chah
- Dharma name: Nisabho

Senior posting
- Teacher: Ajahn Anan, Ajahn Pasanno, Ajahn Jayasāro
- Based in: Clear Mountain Monastery, North Bend, Washington, US

Ajahn Nisabho is an American Theravada Buddhist monk of the Thai Forest Tradition, co-founder and co-abbot of Clear Mountain Monastery in North Bend, Washington. He is an instructor in the Sam Harris meditation app Waking Up.

== Biography ==
Born in San Francisco and raised in Spokane, Washington, by parents whom a profile in the magazine The Fourth Messenger describes as "meditation-minded," Nisabho adopted their interest at fifteen and began to sit regularly, attending retreats and growing steadily more confident in the Buddha's path. According to the magazine Tricycle, his parents had studied with the teacher Jack Kornfield, and at fifteen he read Hermann Hesse's Siddhartha, which he later recalled as "archetypal and delicious."

He kept meditating through college and spent time oriented toward social work, including a gap year in Calcutta alongside a doctor working in the slums, before deciding, after a visit to Abhayagiri Buddhist Monastery in California, that monastic life was the deeper container he needed. After finishing university in 2012 he left his native Washington to go forth as a Buddhist monk in Thailand, receiving full ordination the following spring under Ajahn Anan, a senior disciple of the meditation master Ajahn Chah. He spent the following years training in forest monasteries in Thailand, the United States and Australia with teachers of the Ajahn Chah tradition, including Ajahn Anan, Ajahn Pasanno and Ajahn Jayasāro.

== Clear Mountain Monastery ==
In the summer of 2021 Nisabho returned to Seattle to found Clear Mountain Monastery together with Ajahn Kovilo, becoming co-abbot. He later described Seattle as having "rich dharma ground" but, strangely, no forest monastery, which struck him as "the great missing puzzle piece" in people's dharmic lives. From 2021 the two monks went for alms most mornings at Pike Place Market, and the community gathered on Saturday mornings next to St. Mark's Episcopal Cathedral. In 2026 the monastery closed on the first of two properties near North Bend, a forty-minute drive from downtown Seattle, with a second adjoining parcel expected once a title matter is resolved; the two parcels together comprise about ninety acres, including forest that serves as an elk migration corridor and a view of Mount Si. The full purchase price of US$4.93 million was raised by the monastery's global community of lay supporters, who also dedicated over 3.3 million recitations of the traditional Pali refuge chant in support of the effort. The vision for the property includes up to twenty huts for monastics (kutis), a large temple, a multi-purpose hall and a residence for visiting bhikkhunis.

== Writings ==
Nisabho is a contributor to the Buddhist magazine The Fourth Messenger. His articles include "Lotuses under Eucalyptus: Faith, Giving, & the Founding of Dhammagiri in Australia" (2022), on the founding of Dhammagiri Forest Hermitage in Brisbane, where he trained, and the two-part series "War & Peace", on the journeys of British veterans who found the Dhamma at Amaravati Buddhist Monastery. Together with Bhante Joe Atulo he also edited and introduced two installments of the teachings of the Sri Lankan monk Ñāṇadīpa, published posthumously in 2021 after the latter's terminal cancer diagnosis.

== See also ==
- Clear Mountain Monastery
- Ajahn Kovilo
- Thai Forest Tradition
