= Buddhism in Portugal =

Buddhism in Portugal refers to the presence and development of Buddhist traditions within Portugal. Although Portugal has historically been predominantly Christian, Buddhism has established a small but visible presence since the late 20th century. Its development reflects broader Western European patterns of religious diversification, global migration, and the international transmission of Asian religious traditions.

== Demographics ==
According to the Instituto Nacional de Estatística (INE), Buddhism constitutes a small minority of religious affiliation in Portugal. International demographic studies similarly classify Portugal as having a minor Buddhist population.

The Buddhist population consists of both Portuguese converts and immigrant communities, particularly from East Asia. Chinese immigrant communities have contributed to the establishment of Mahāyāna temples, while Western converts have more frequently been associated with Zen, Theravāda, and Tibetan meditation groups.

== Historical development ==
Organized Buddhist activity in Portugal began to emerge in the late 20th century, paralleling developments across Western Europe. Increased translation of Buddhist texts, participation in European meditation networks, and visits by international teachers contributed to the establishment of meditation groups and retreat centers.

By the early 2000s, formal organizations representing Theravāda, Mahāyāna, and Vajrayāna traditions had been established. The construction of a large stupa in 2017 reflected growing institutional visibility and public presence.

== Traditions ==
=== Theravāda ===
Theravāda Buddhism in Portugal is primarily represented through meditation communities connected to the Thai Forest Tradition. A monastery established near Ericeira in 2018 follows the lineage associated with Ajahn Chah and Ajahn Sumedho.

=== Tibetan Buddhism ===
Tibetan Buddhist institutions in Portugal are affiliated with established international lineages, including Nyingma, Kagyu, Sakya, and Gelug traditions. Organizations host teachings, retreats, and study programs and maintain connections with global Tibetan Buddhist networks.

=== Mahāyāna and Zen ===
Zen and other Mahāyāna traditions are represented by meditation centers affiliated with Japanese, Korean, and Chinese schools. Chinese Mahāyāna temples serve immigrant communities and maintain devotional practices and festivals.

== Organizations and institutions ==
Buddhist organizations in Portugal generally operate as non-profit religious associations under national law. Some foundations have received official recognition from the Portuguese state. Activities commonly include meditation retreats, public lectures, translation work, and interfaith dialogue initiatives.

== Cultural influence ==
Although Buddhism remains numerically small, meditation and mindfulness practices have gained broader recognition in Portuguese society, reflecting global contemplative trends. Cultural interest in Buddhist imagery is reflected in exhibitions, gardens, and artistic installations inspired by Buddhist symbolism.

== See also ==
- Buddhism in Europe
- Religion in Portugal
- Freedom of religion in Portugal
