= Clear Mountain Monastery =

Theravada Buddhist forest monastery in North Bend, Washington

- Location within Washington (state)

Religion
- Affiliation: Theravada Buddhism

Location
- Location: North Bend, Washington, United States
- Country: United States
- Coordinates: 47.45738°N 121.761119°W

Architecture
- Founder: Ajahn Kovilo, Ajahn Nisabho
- Established: 2021

Website
- www.clearmountain.org

Clear Mountain Monastery is a Theravada Buddhist monastery of the Thai Forest Tradition in North Bend, Washington, United States, approximately forty minutes east of Seattle. It was founded in 2021 by the monks Ajahn Kovilo and Ajahn Nisabho, who serve as co-abbots, and is the first forest monastery of the tradition in the Seattle area.

== History ==
Ajahn Nisabho, a native of Washington, went to Thailand in 2012 after finishing college and received full ordination in 2013 under Ajahn Anan, a senior disciple of the meditation master Ajahn Chah. He trained in forest monasteries with masters such as Ajahn Anan, Ajahn Pasanno and Ajahn Jayasāro before returning to Seattle in the summer of 2021 to plant the first seeds of the monastery. Ajahn Kovilo came to Buddhism through ten-day Goenka Vipassana retreats, entered monastic life in 2006, and received full ordination from Ajahn Pasanno and Ajahn Amaro at Abhayagiri Buddhist Monastery in 2010. He spent the next decade training in Ajahn Chah monasteries in the United States and Thailand, completing all levels of the Nak-Tham exams in Thai, and later studied Pali and Mahayana at the Dharma Realm Buddhist University.

From 2021 the two monks lived on the periphery of Seattle, going for alms most mornings at Pike Place Market, where, as Ajahn Nisabho recalled, seven people offered food in thirty minutes on their first day. On Saturday mornings the community gathered at the Amistad School next to St. Mark's Episcopal Cathedral on Capitol Hill for meditation and teaching, attracting people from the region and from around the world. The relationship with the cathedral deepened over the years: the two communities hold an annual January lunch, and since the summer of 2024 they have held a joint interfaith worship service.

== Land purchase and construction ==
After nearly three years of searching rural areas around Seattle, on 30 April 2026 Clear Mountain closed on a fifty-acre parcel near North Bend, east of downtown Seattle, with a second adjoining forty-acre parcel of forest expected to follow once a title matter is resolved, bringing the property to ninety acres. The land, about a forty-minute drive from downtown Seattle, lies within an elk migration corridor and is close enough to North Bend for the monastics to go on daily alms rounds for their single meal of the day. The full purchase price of the two parcels, US$4.93 million, was raised by the monastery's global community of lay supporters, who also dedicated over 3.3 million recitations of the traditional Pali refuge chant in support of the effort. The vision for the property includes up to twenty huts for monastics (kutis), a large temple, a multi-purpose hall, gardens and forest paths, and a residence for visiting bhikkhunis, with a view of Mount Si.

In the short term, the monastics planned to move onto the land after the summer retreat of 2026, inhabiting the structures already present on the property while the master plan and phased construction are developed. On 2 May 2026 the community gathered on the land with female monastics from Parayana Vihara in Port Townsend and Passaddhi Vihara in Olympia to celebrate the purchase, burying elemental offerings near the site where the temple hall is to be built. The project has also received guidance from the Taoist master ZhiCheng, who walked the land with the community in February 2026.

== Activities ==
Clear Mountain offers online and in-person teachings, sutta and Pali study, morning and evening pūjas (chanting and meditation), and daily meal offerings. The community runs the podcast Clear Mountain Monastery Project (also known as Saṃsāra's Like This), in which the monks converse with guests from the broader Buddhist world. In 2025 they launched a collaborative translation of the Majjhima Nikāya into English.

== See also ==
- Abhayagiri Buddhist Monastery
