= Ajahn Khemadhammo =

British Buddhist monk (born 1944)

Ajahn Khemadhammo OBE
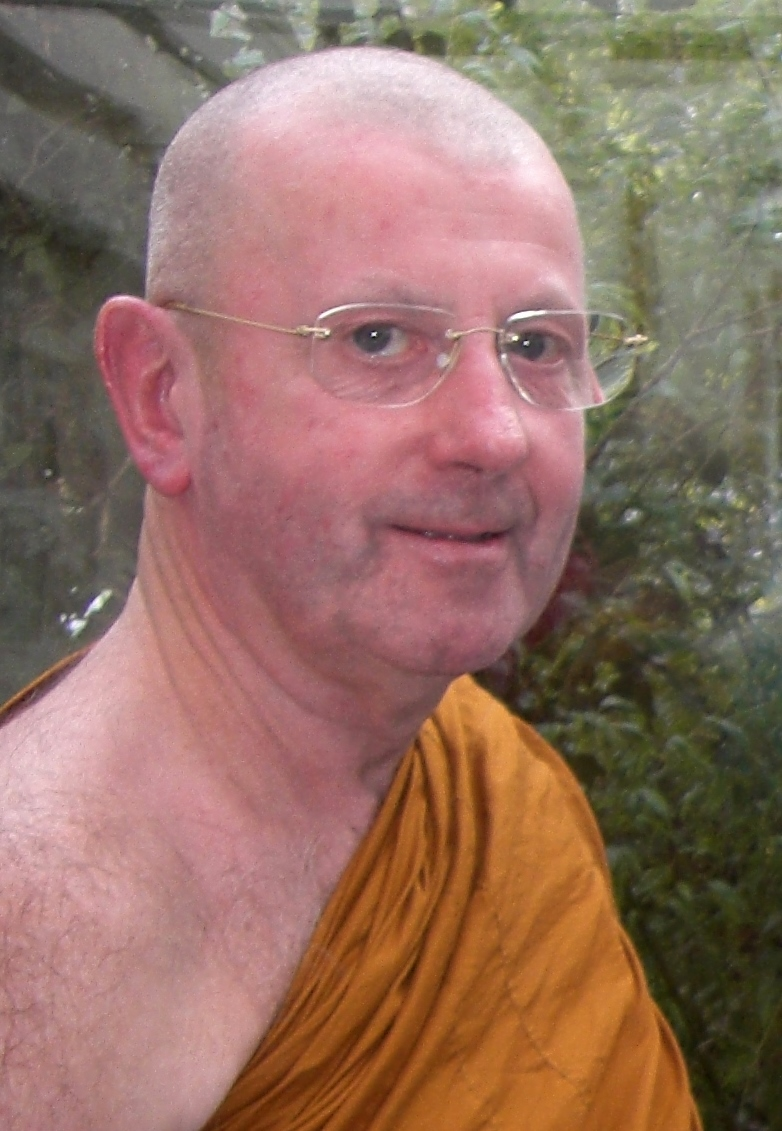

Personal life
- Born: Alan Adams; 17 July 1944 (age 82) Gosport, England
- Website: The Forest Hermitage Luangpor's News & Musings

Religious life
- Religion: Buddhism
- Order: Maha Nikaya
- School: Theravāda
- Lineage: Thai Forest Tradition
- Ordination: 26 May 1972, aged 27 (54 years ago)

Senior posting
- Teacher: Ajahn Chah
- Post: Abbot of the Forest Hermitage (since 1985)

Ajahn Khemadhammo OBE (also known as Chao Khun Bhavanaviteht; born 17 July 1944) is a Theravāda Buddhist monk and retired professional actor. He is one of the founders of the Thai Forest Tradition in the West.

== Biography ==
Khemadhammo was born in Portsmouth, England. In 1971, after training at the Royal Central School of Speech and Drama and Drama Centre, London and practising as a professional actor, working for several years at the Royal National Theatre in London with Laurence Olivier and Edward Petherbridge (a period in which he appeared in Shakespearian dramas as well as in plays by Tom Stoppard and Anton Chekov, studying intensively Stanislavski's system), he travelled to Thailand via the Buddhist pilgrimage sites in India. In December 1971 in Bangkok he became a novice monk and about a month later moved to Ubon to stay with Ajahn Chah Wat Nong Pah Pong at Wat Nong Pah Pong : Wat Nong Pah Pong (Generally shortened to: Wat Pah Pong, Thai: วัดหนองป่าพง) is a Theravada Buddhist hermitage in Ubon Ratchathani Province, (Amphoe) Warin Chamrap, devoted to the practice of contemplation, Dhutanga practice and asceticism which was established by the late Ajahn Chah as the main monastery of the Thai Forest Tradition. On the day before Vesakha Puja (Vesak) of that year, 1972, Ajahn Khemadhammo received Upasampadā as a bhikkhu, a fully ordained Buddhist monk.

In 1977, Khemadhammo returned to the UK with Ajahn Chah and stayed with him during his two-month visit at the old Hampstead Vihara.After Ajahn Chah's return to Thailand, Ajahn Khemadhammo remained at Hampstead and eighteen months later set up a small recluse monastery on the Isle of Wight. In 1984, at the invitation of a group of Buddhist Samatha and Vipassanā meditators that he had been visiting monthly for some years, he moved to Banner Hill near Kenilworth and formed the Buddha-Dhamma Fellowship. In 1985, he moved to his current residence, the contemplative Forest Hermitage, a property in Warwickshire; in 1987, with considerable help from meditator-acolytes and devotees in Thailand, this land was purchased by the Buddha-Dhamma Fellowship. A stupa was built there in 1988 by Sayadaw U Thilawunta, known as the English Shwedagon Pagoda.

Khemadhammo began Buddhist prison chaplaincy work in 1977. In 1985, with the help of others, Angulimala, the Buddhist Prison Chaplaincy, was launched with him as its Spiritual Director. Currently, Luang Por Khemadhammo continues to visit prisons and teach meditation both at his forest hermitage contemplative monastery Vihara and at Warwick University.

Ajahn Khemadhammo was appointed an OBE (Officer of the Most Excellent Order of the British Empire) in the Queen's Birthday Honours, June 2003 for 'services to prisoners'.

In December 2004, on the birthday of King Bhumibol Adulyadej, he was made a Chao Khun with the ecclesiastical title of Phra Bhavanaviteht. He was only the second foreign-born monk to receive such an honour.

In May 2013 he was awarded an Honorary Doctorate in Vipassanabhavana by Mahachulalongkornrajavidyalaya University, Thailand.

In January 2015, on Burmese Independence Day (Independence Day (Myanmar)), it was announced by the President of Burma that he had been awarded the title Aggamaha Saddhamma Jotikadhaja. This was duly conferred at an investiture ceremony in Nay Pyi Taw, the new capital of Myanmar (Burma), on 4 March 2015.

He is the Chair of TBSUK – the Theravada Buddhist Sangha in the UK.

== Sources ==
- Beckford, James A. (2005). Religion in Prison: 'Equal Rites' in a Multi-Faith Society. Cambridge University Press. ISBN 978-0521021531.
- Kittisaro; Thanissara (2014). Listening to the Heart: A Contemplative Journey to Engaged Buddhism. North Atlantic Books. ISBN 978-1583948392.
- Snelling, John (1992). The Buddhist Handbook: A Complete Guide to Buddhist Schools, Teaching, Practice, and History. Inner Traditions. ISBN 978-0892813193.
