= Ajahn Pasanno =

Canadian Buddhist monk (born 1949)

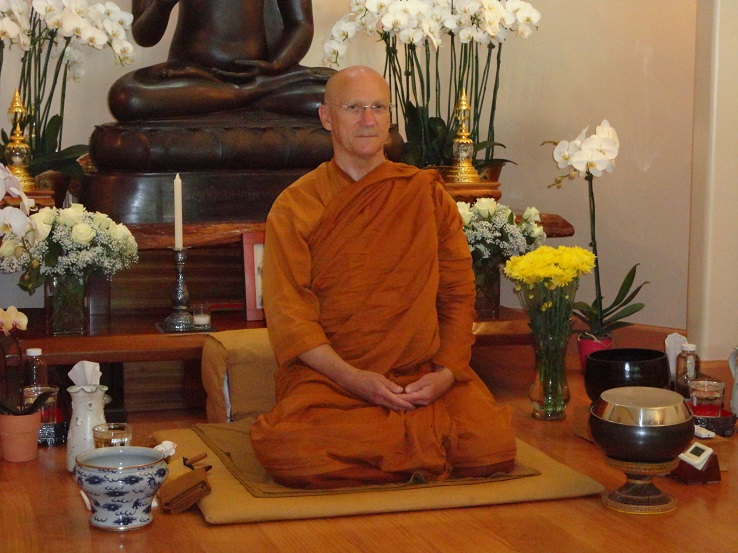
- Ajahn Pasanno at Abhayagiri Buddhist Monastery, September 2013 (Photo by Brian Carniello)

Personal life
- Born: Reed Perry; July 26, 1949 (age 77) Manitoba, Canada
- Education: University of Winnipeg, Canada, Bachelor of Arts (History)
- Occupation: Buddhist monk
- Website: abhayagiri.org

Religious life
- Religion: Buddhism
- School: Theravada, Maha Nikaya
- Lineage: Forest Tradition of Ajahn Chah
- Dharma name: Pasanno

Senior posting
- Teacher: Ven. Ajahn Chah
- Based in: Abhayagiri Monastery, Redwood Valley, California, US

Ajahn Pasanno (born July 26, 1949) is the most senior Western disciple of Ven. Ajahn Chah in the United States, and most senior in the world after Ajahn Sumedho and Ajahn Khemadhammo. For many years he was the abbot of Wat Pah Nanachat International Forest Monastery in Northeast Thailand. In the late 1990s, Ajahn Pasanno moved to California to head the new Abhayagiri Monastery. With more than 40 years as a bhikkhu (Buddhist monk), Ajahn Pasanno has been instrumental in training many monks in Thailand and the United States and has been supportive of training for women.

On December 5, 2015, at the Temple of the Emerald Buddha (Wat Phra Kaew Thai: วัดพระแก้ว, RTGS: Wat Phra Kaeo, pronounced [wát pʰrá(ʔ) kɛ̂ːw]) in Bangkok, Ajahn Pasanno received the honorary ecclesiastical title “Chao Khun” and name “Phra Bodhinyanavidesa” from the Crown Prince of Thailand, on behalf of His Majesty King Bhumibol Adulyadej. The title “Chao Khun” is given periodically to monks in the Thai tradition who have distinguished themselves with their contributions to the monastic tradition. This high honour is particularly significant as Western monks are rarely awarded this special recognition.

== Biography ==
Ajahn Pasanno was born on July 26, 1949, in The Pas, Manitoba, Canada. In 1972 he finished his studies at the University of Winnipeg, Canada, and graduated with a Bachelor of Arts in History. A year later, in 1973, he travelled to Asia through Turkey, Iran, Afghanistan and Pakistan, to India, Nepal and finally Thailand, where Ajahn Pasanno travelled to a meditation monastery in Chiang Mai. He studied the Tipitaka in English and enrolled in a month of meditation retreat.

On January 4, 1974, at the age of 24, Ajahn Pasanno took ordination at Wat Pleng Vipassana in Bangkok, Thailand with Venerable Phra Khru Ñāṇasirivatana as preceptor. During his first year as a monk he was taken by his teacher to meet Ajahn Chah, with whom he asked to be allowed to stay and train. One of the early residents of Wat Pah Nanachat, Ajahn Pasanno became its abbot in his ninth year. During Ajahn Pasanno's tenure as abbot, Wat Pah Nanachat developed considerably, increasing in size from 40 acres to 140 acres, and Ajahn Pasanno initiated an extensive tree-planting project that made Wat Pah Nanachat a model site for reforestation with the Department of Forestry in Ubon Ratchathani.

In 1990, Ajahn Pasanno established Poo Jom Gom hermitage in Ampher Khong Chiam, Ubon Ratchathani Province (adjacent to Pah Dtaem National Park) as a forest retreat facility for Wat Pah Nanachat. One year later, he established Dtao Dum Hermitage inside Sai Yok National Park in Kanchanaburi Province as another forest retreat for facility Buddhist monks. In addition to their function as places of meditation practice and monastic training, they help to protect the surrounding forests and natural environment and thus have received support from the Department of Forestry and the Thai military.

As abbot of Wat Pah Nanachat, Ajahn Pasanno was also involved in community development work, helping villages to develop projects that helped village harmony, virtue, and livelihood, and he started organizations that worked with villagers in northeast Thailand to protect areas of forest. In 1991, he helped to draw a group of people together in the Ubon Ratchathani region who were interested in forest conservation and community development, which was formally established as the Nature Care Foundation in 1992 and continues to work for the benefit of the community, facilitating environmental education, cooperation between governmental and non-governmental organizations, and the initiation of projects to support sustainable livelihood. Ajahn Pasanno ordained many trees in order to protect them, putting robes around them, holding traditional ceremonies, and chanting for the protection of the forest.

After Ven. Ajahn Chah became ill and died, Ajahn Pasanno was part of the steering committee for administering to the needs of Wat Nong Pah Pong and its branch monasteries, which at the time numbered over 200. In 1992 and 1993, Ajahn Pasanno was directly involved in helping the preparation and organization of the royal funeral of Ajahn Chah (Phra Bodhinyanathera) at Wat Nong Pah Pong, Ampher Warin, Ubon Ratchathani Province. Over a period of ten days for the funeral there was Dhamma instruction and practice. Over a million people passed through the monastery during that time. On the day of the cremation, between 300,000 and 400,000 people were in attendance.

Spending 24 years living in Thailand, Ajahn Pasanno became a well-known and highly respected monk and Dhamma teacher. Prior to leaving Thailand, he was appointed an official preceptor with authority to preside over ordinations of sāmaṇeras and bhikkhus.

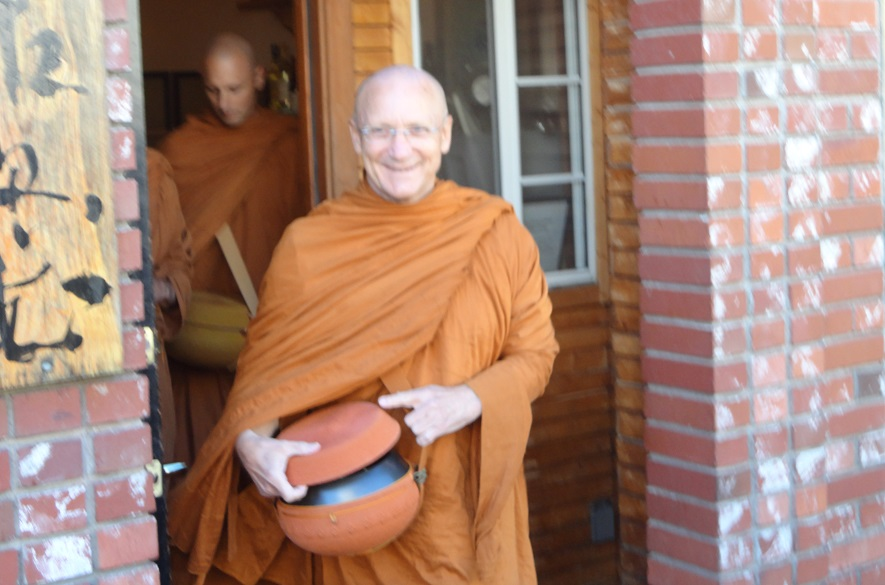
Ajahn Pasanno walking in Ukiah, accepting offerings of alms food. Full Moon Observance Day, September 2013 (Photo by Brian Carniello)

Ajahn Pasanno moved to California on New Year's Eve of 1997 to share the abbotship of Abhayagiri Monastery, Redwood Valley, California, with Ajahn Amaro. In addition to leading the community at Abhayagiri, his spiritual activities shortly after arriving in California ranged from traveling to San Quentin Prison in order to provide spiritual counseling for Jaturun "Jay" Siripongs, who was executed on February 9, 1999, to leading monks from Abhayagiri to visit, make offerings, and chant for Julia Butterfly Hill, who was living in a 1500-year-old California Redwood tree in order to protect it from Pacific Lumber Company loggers.

With Ajahn Pasanno's help, support, and spiritual guidance, three lay followers, Sakula (Mary Reinard), Barbara Backstrand, and Chris Robson, founded Portland Friends of the Dhamma in 2000. In 2010, the Pacific Hermitage, a branch of Abhayagiri Buddhist Monastery, was founded in the Columbia River Gorge along a forested stretch of White Salmon's Jewett Creek with the support of Ajahn Pasanno, who encouraged Ajahn Sudanto to lead the effort to establish the Pacific Hermitage.

In February 2010, Ajahn Amaro accepted an invitation to serve as abbot of Amaravati Buddhist Monastery in England. After Ajahn Amaro's departure on July 20, 2010, Ajahn Pasanno became the sole abbot of Abhayagiri until July 11, 2018. Abhayagiri monastery developed significantly under his leadership and guidance. Over 25 kutis (huts for monastics) were built during his time as co-abbot and abbot. He also helped in the development of the Bhikkhu Commons (also known as the Monks' Utility Building, or MUB) which was dedicated on July 4, 2010, and the building of the new Reception Hall, which is a two-story complex that includes a spacious meditation hall, a larger and more modern kitchen, an office, a library, guest rooms, a child care room, bathrooms and showers for laymen, a laundry room, a small shrine room/reliquary, as well as covered decks and storage rooms. The Reception Hall building began in July 2013 and ended June 30, 2018 with the cloister area inauguration. On June 8, 2018, a celebration was held at Abhayagiri for Ajahn Pasanno's 70th birthday, paying respects to him before his departure for a year sabbatical, as well as to honour his 37 years as an abbot in both Thailand and the U.S.. Ajahn Pasanno plans to return to Abhayagiri at the end of his sabbatical, but will not be taking up his position as abbot again. Instead, he passed along the new co-abbot leadership to Ajahn Karunadhammo and Ajahn Nyaniko (both long term Abhayagiri resident monks) just before departing on July 11, 2018.

== Thai honorific ranks ==
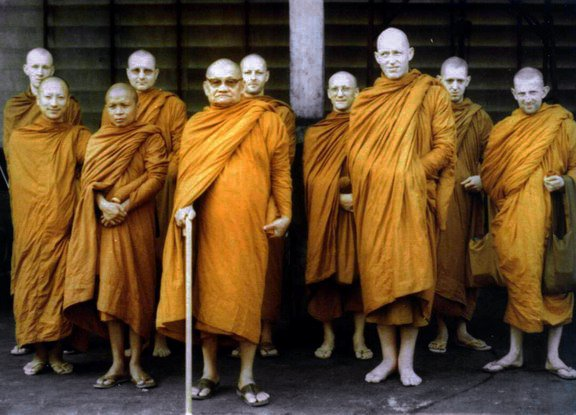
Ajahn Chah and his disciples (included Ajahn Pasanno).

- December 5, 2015 – Phra Bodhiñāṇavidesha (พระโพธิญาณวิเทศ)
- July 28, 2019 – Chao Khun

== Bibliography ==
- Nourishing the Roots – by Ajahn Pasanno (2021, Abhayagiri Buddhist Monastery Publications)
- Beneath the Bodhi Tree – by Ajahn Pasanno (2018, Abhayagiri Buddhist Monastery Publications)
- Abundant, Exalted, Immeasurable – by Ajahn Pasanno (2016, Abhayagiri Buddhist Monastery Publications)
- Don't Hold Back – by Ajahn Pasanno (2013, Abhayagiri Buddhist Monastery Publications)
- Ajahn Chah's Teachings On Nature – by Ajahn Pasanno (2011, Abhayagiri Buddhist Monastery Publications)
- On Becoming and Stopping – by Ajahn Pasanno (2011, Abhayagiri Buddhist Monastery Publications)
- The Island: An Anthology of the Buddha’s Teachings on Nibbāna – by Ajahn Pasanno & Ajahn Amaro (2009, Abhayagiri Buddhist Monastery Publications)
- Like a River – by Ajahn Pasanno, Ajahn Amaro et al. (2008, Patriya Tansuhaj)
- A Dhamma Compass – by Ajahn Pasanno (2006, Abhayagiri Buddhist Monastery Publications)
- To the Last Breath – by Ajahn Pasanno (2003, Abhayagiri Buddhist Monastery Publications)
- Broad View - Boundless Heart – by Ajahn Pasanno & Ajahn Amaro (2001, Abhayagiri Buddhist Monastery Publications)
- The Dhamma and the Real World – by Ajahn Pasanno & Ajahn Amaro (2000, Abhayagiri Buddhist Monastery Publications)
- Words of Calm and Friendship – by Ajahn Pasanno & Ajahn Amaro (1999, Abhayagiri Buddhist Monastery Publications)
