= Ajahn Jayasāro =

Theravāda Buddhist monk (born 1958)

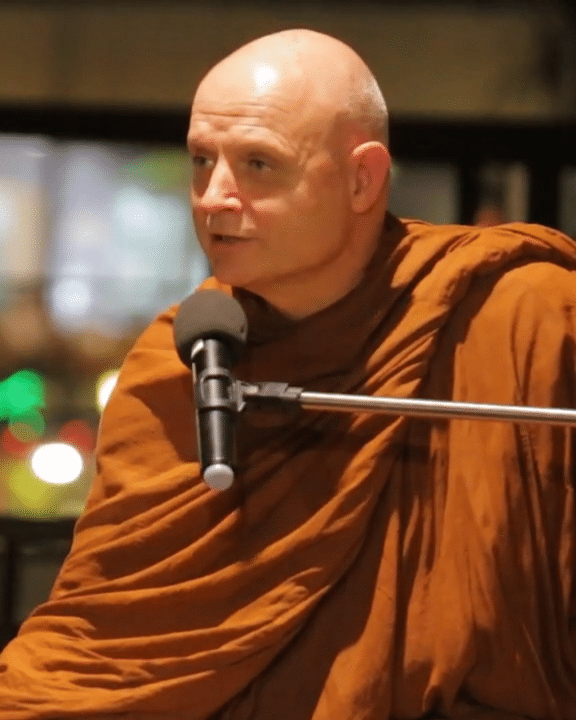
- Ajahn Jayasāro in 2018

Personal life
- Born: Shaun Michael Chiverton; 7 January 1958 (age 68) Isle of Wight, England
- Citizenship: United Kingdom; Thailand
- Notable work(s): Stillness Flowing: The Life and Teachings of Ajahn Chah (2017)
- Website: jayasaro.panyaprateep.org

Religious life
- Religion: Buddhism
- Order: Mahā Nikāya
- School: Theravāda
- Lineage: Thai Forest Tradition
- Dharma name: Jayasāro ชยสาโร
- Ordination: 3 June 1980, aged 22; (46 years ago); Wat Nong Pah Pong

Senior posting
- Teacher: Ajahn Chah (upajjhāya)
- Based in: Ban Rai Thosi, Pak Chong, Nakhon Ratchasima
- Previous post: Abbot of Wat Pah Nanachat (1997–2002)

Ajahn Jayasāro (born 7 January 1958) is a British and Thai Buddhist monk in the Forest Tradition of Ajahn Chah.

== Biography ==
Jayasāro was born Shaun Michael Chiverton on 7 January 1958 on the Isle of Wight in England. After finishing school and working to earn some money, he spent a number of years travelling, making his way overland from England to India. Upon his return, he attended a ten-day course at a vipassanā mediation centre. The centre had been founded by an Englishman who had been a monk in the Thai Forest Tradition. In the evenings, he gave Dhamma talks in which he described his experiences as a monk in Thailand, and these talks inspired Jayasāro to become a monk himself.

In 1978, he joined Ajahn Sumedho's community at Oaken Holt, Oxford, for the rains retreat (vassa) as an anagārika. In November of that year, he travelled to Thailand, where he became a disciple of Ajahn Chah at Wat Nong Pah Pong. His lower ordination (pabbajjā) as a novice monk (sāmaṇera) took place in the early part of 1980, and he received higher ordination (upasampadā) as a bhikkhu on 3 June 1980, at the age of 22, with Ajahn Chah as his preceptor (upajjhāya).

From 1997 to 2002, he was the abbot of Wat Pah Nanachat.

In 2017, he published a biography of Ajahn Chah entitled Stillness Flowing.

In 2019, he was honoured with a royal title from King Vajiralongkorn (Rama X). On 9 March 2020, he was granted Thai citizenship by royal decree.

On 12 July 2026, he was elevated to the rank of Somdet Phra Rachakhana and awarded the title of Somdet Phra Maha Phatcharayanamuni. He is the first foreign-born monk in the history of Thailand to hold the rank of Somdet Phra Rachakhana.

Since 2003, he has lived in a hermitage in Pak Chong, Nakhon Ratchasima, near Khao Yai National Park. The hermitage is sometimes referred to as Ban Rai Thosi and sometimes as Janamāra.

== Thai honorific ranks ==
- 28 July 2019 – Phra Rat Phatcharamanit Phisitthammakhunsunthon Mahakhanitson Bowonsangkharam Khammawasi (พระราชพัชรมานิต พิสิฐธรรมคุณสุนทร มหาคณิสสร บวรสังฆาราม คามวาสี)
- 17 July 2020 – Phra Thep Phatcharayanamuni Wipatsanawithikoson Wimonphawanaworakit Mahakhanitson Bowonsangkharam Khammawasi (พระเทพพัชรญาณมุนี วิปัสสนาวิธีโกศล วิมลภาวนาวรกิจ มหาคณิสสร บวรสังฆาราม คามวาสี)
- 7 July 2021 – Phra Tham Phatcharayanamuni Silachansuwimon Kosonkitchanukit Mahakhanitson Bowonsangkharam Khammawasi Aranyawasi (พระธรรมพัชรญาณมุนี ภาวนาวิธีสุวิธาน สีลาจารสุวิมล โกศลกิจจานุกิจ มหาคณิสสร บวรสังฆาราม คามวาสี)
- 12 May 2024 – Phra Phrom Phatcharayanamuni Siwipatsanathurachan Phaisanwithetsatsanakit Wisitsilachandilok Sathokthammawichit Mahakhanitson Bowonsangkharam Khammawasi Aranyawasi (พระพรหมพัชรญาณมุนี ศรีวิปัสสนาธุราจารย์ ไพศาลวิเทศศาสนกิจ วิสิฐศีลาจารดิลก สาธกธรรมวิจิตร มหาคณิสสร บวรสังฆาราม คามวาสี)
- 12 July 2026 – Somdet Phra Maha Phatcharayanamuni Siwipatsanaphawanaphoson Sophonthammanusit Wichitthammapatiphan Phaisanwithetkitthada Susilachanwatsunthon Mahakhanitson Bowonsangkharam Khammawasi Aranyawasi (สมเด็จพระมหาพัชรญาณมุนี ศรีวิปัสสนาภาวนาโภศล โสภณธรรมานุสิฐ วิจิตรธรรมปฏิภาณ ไพศาลวิเทศกิจธาดา สุสีลาจารวัตรสุนทร มหาคณิสสร บวรสังฆาราม คามวาสี อรัญวาสี)

== Notable works ==
- Letting Go Within Action (2006)
- On Love (2010)
- Daughters and Sons (2011)
- Mindfulness, Precepts and Crashing in the Same Car (2011)
- Seen in Their True Light (2012)
- Without and Within: Questions and Answers on the Teachings of Theravāda Buddhism (2013)
- Skilful Desires (2014)
- Stillness Flowing: The Life and Teachings of Ajahn Chah (2017)
- From Heart and Hand (2017)
- From Heart and Hand: Vol. II (2019)
- From Heart and Hand: Vol. III (2022)
