= Ajahn Chah =

Buddhist monk of Thai Forest Tradition (1918–1992)

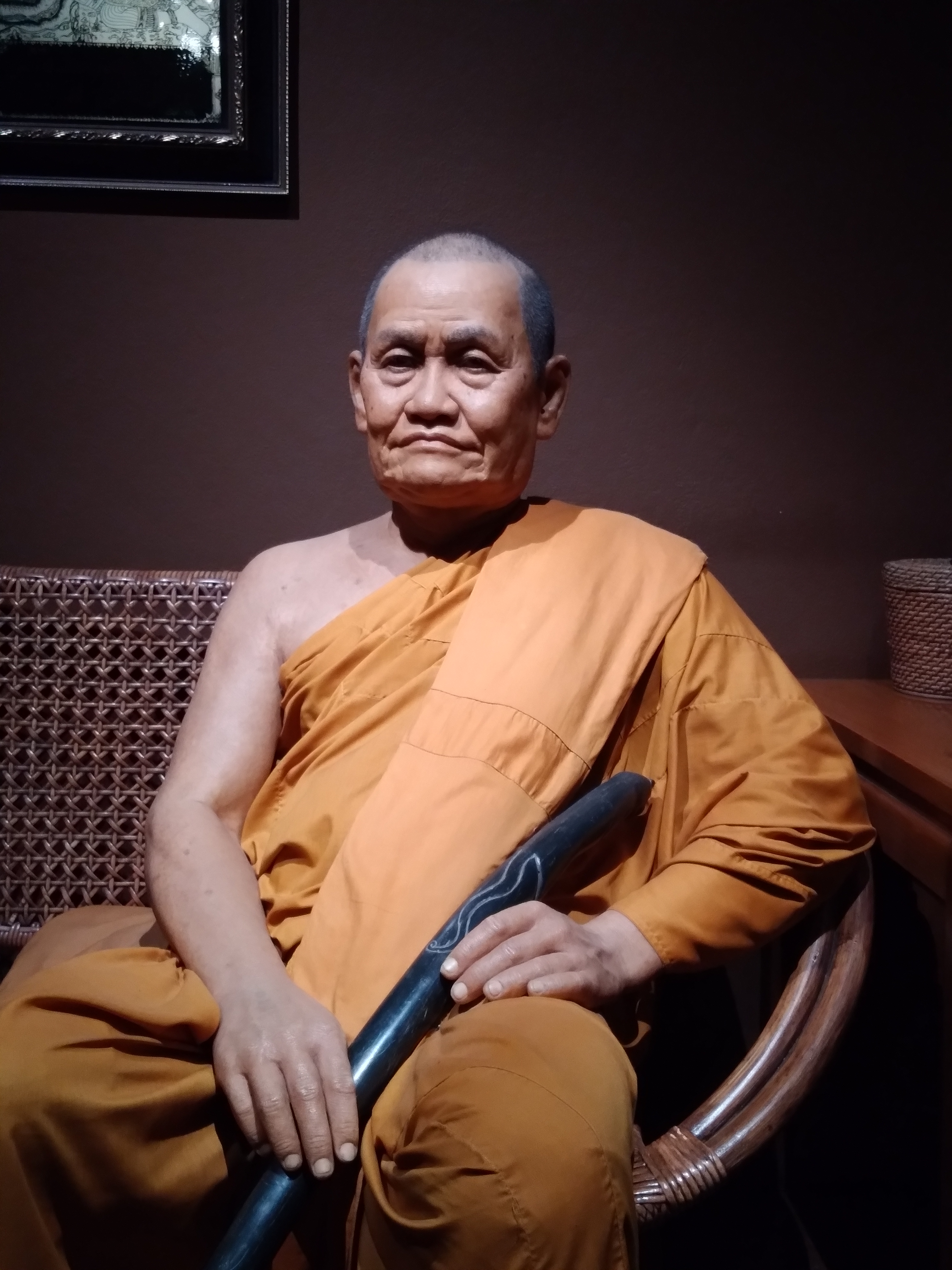

Personal life
- Born: Chah Chuangchot ชา ช่วงโชติ 17 June 1918 near Ubon Ratchathani, Siam
- Died: 16 January 1992 (aged 73) Ubon Ratchathani, Thailand

Religious life
- Religion: Buddhism
- Order: Mahā Nikāya
- School: Theravāda
- Lineage: Thai Forest Tradition
- Dharma name: Subhaddo สุภทฺโท
- Monastic name: Phra Bodhiñāṇathera พระโพธิญาณเถร

Ajahn Chah (17 June 1918 – 16 January 1992) was a Thai Buddhist monk. He was an influential teacher of the Buddhadhamma and a founder of two major monasteries in the Thai Forest Tradition.

Respected and loved in his own country as a man of great wisdom, he was also instrumental in establishing Theravada Buddhism in the West. Beginning in 1979 with the founding of Cittaviveka (commonly known as Chithurst Buddhist Monastery) in the United Kingdom, the Forest Tradition of Ajahn Chah has spread throughout Europe, the United States and the British Commonwealth. The dhamma talks of Ajahn Chah have been recorded, transcribed and translated into several languages.

More than one million people, including the Thai royal family, attended Ajahn Chah's funeral in January 1993 held a year after his death due to the "hundreds of thousands of people expected to attend". He left behind a legacy of dhamma talks, students, and monasteries.

== Name ==
Ajahn Chah (Thai: อาจารย์ชา) was also commonly known as Luang Por Chah (Thai: หลวงพ่อชา). His birth name was Chah Chuangchot (Thai: ชา ช่วงโชติ), his Dhamma name was Subhaddo (Thai: สุภทฺโท), and his monastic title was Phra Bodhiñāṇathera (Thai: พระโพธิญาณเถร).

== Early life and ordination ==
Ajahn Chah was born on 17 June 1918 near Ubon Ratchathani in the Isan region of northeast Thailand. His family were subsistence farmers. As is traditional, Ajahn Chah entered the monastery as a novice (sāmaṇera) at the age of nine, where, during a three-year stay, he learned to read and write.

According to the 2017 biography Stillness Flowing and other sources, Ajahn Chah took novice vows again in March 1931 under the name Samanera Cha Chuangchot. His preceptor was Phra Khru Wichit Thammaphani (Phuang), then abbot of Wat Maniwanaram, Ubon Ratchathani. As a novice, he studied Buddhist scriptures and diligently performed monastic duties, including chanting, observing precepts, and following the Dhamma curriculum for samaneras. After three years, he disrobed to assist his family on the farm due to economic necessity, like many in the agrarian Northeast, but remained committed to reordaining at age 20.

On 26 April 1939 at 1:55 p.m., with his parents' permission, he was ordained as a monk (bhikkhu) at Wat Ko Nai in Tambon That, Amphoe Warin Chamrap, Ubon Ratchathani. His preceptor was Phra Khru Inthasarakun, with Phra Khru Wirun Sutthakan as the kammavācācariya and Phra Athi Sorn as the anusāvanācariya. He was given the monastic name Subhaddo (meaning “well-going”).

Bhikkhu Cha Subhaddo remained at Wat Kon Ok for two years, where he pursued advanced Dhamma studies and passed the third level of the Dhamma examinations, studying both independently and under monastic teachers.

In 1946, following the death of his father, Ajahn Chah left the settled monastic life and chose to live as a wandering ascetic monk in the Thai Forest Tradition. He walked across Thailand, practicing meditation and studying under various renowned teachers, including Ajahn Mun Bhuridatta, a leading figure in the Forest Tradition.

He spent time living in forests, caves, and cremation grounds, developing insight through contemplation of impermanence and death. A website devoted to Ajahn Chah describes this period:

For the next seven years Ajahn Chah practiced in the style of an ascetic monk in the austere Forest Tradition, spending his time in forests, caves and cremation grounds. He wandered through the countryside in quest of quiet and secluded places for developing meditation. He lived in tiger and cobra infested jungles, using reflections on death to penetrate to the true meaning of life.

== Thai forest tradition ==
During the early part of the twentieth century Theravada Buddhism underwent a revival in Thailand under the leadership of teachers whose intentions were to raise the standards of Buddhist practise throughout the country. One of these teachers was Ajahn Mun. Ajahn Chah continued Ajahn Mun's high standards of practice when he became a teacher.

The monks of this tradition keep very strictly what they believe to be the original monastic rule laid down by the Buddha known as the vinaya. The early major schisms in the Buddhist sangha were largely due to disagreements over which set of training rules should be applied. Some adopted a more flexible set, whereas others adopted a stricter one, both sides believing to follow the rules as the Buddha had framed them. The Theravada tradition is the heir to the latter view. An example of the strictness of the discipline might be the rule that prohibits eating before dawn and after noon. In the Thai Forest Tradition, monks and nuns go further and observe the 'one eaters practice', whereby they only eat once a day. This special practice is one of the thirteen dhutanga, optional ascetic practices permitted by the Buddha that are used on an occasional or regular basis to deepen meditation practice and promote contentment with subsistence. Other examples of these practices are sleeping outside under a tree, or dwelling in secluded forests or graveyards.

== Monasteries founded ==
After years of wandering, Ajahn Chah decided to plant roots in an uninhabited grove near his birthplace. In 1954, Wat Nong Pah Pong monastery was established, where Ajahn Chah could teach his simple, practice-based form of meditation. He attracted a wide variety of disciples, which included, in 1966, the first Westerner, Venerable Ajahn Sumedho. Wat Nong Pah Pong includes over 250 branches throughout Thailand, as well as over 15 associated monasteries and ten lay practice centers around the world.

In 1975, Wat Pah Nanachat (International Forest Monastery) was founded with Ajahn Sumedho as the abbot. Wat Pah Nanachat was the first monastery in Thailand specifically geared towards training English-speaking Westerners in the monastic Vinaya, as well as the first run by a Westerner.

In 1977, Ajahn Chah and Ajahn Sumedho were invited to visit the United Kingdom by the English Sangha Trust who wanted to form a residential sangha. 1979 saw the founding of Cittaviveka (commonly known as Chithurst Buddhist Monastery due to its location in the small hamlet of Chithurst) with Ajahn Sumedho as its head. Several of Ajahn Chah's Western students have since established monasteries throughout the world.

== Later life ==
By the early 1980s, Ajahn Chah's health was in decline due to diabetes. He was taken to Bangkok for surgery to relieve paralysis caused by the diabetes, but it was to little effect. Ajahn Chah used his ill health as a teaching point, emphasizing that it was "a living example of the impermanence of all things...(and) reminded people to endeavor to find a true refuge within themselves, since he would not be able to teach for very much longer". Ajahn Chah would remain bedridden and ultimately unable to speak for ten years, until his death on 16 January 1992, at the age of 73.

== Described Miracles ==
It is said that on the day Luang Pu first entered the cemetery, a child had died in the village and was to be buried. When he walked to the grave, Luang Pu looked down and reportedly saw a vision of a boy being born clearly within it. The next morning, he asked the layman whether the buried child had been a boy or a girl. The layman confirmed that it was a boy.

== Thai Dhamma Heirs ==
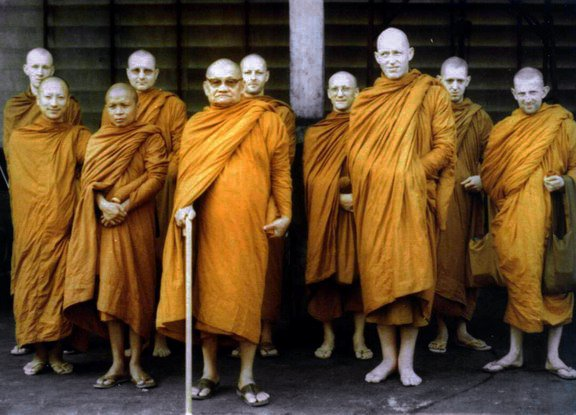
Ajahn Chah and his disciples.

- Phra Ratchawacharasirimongkol (Si Siriyano) Wat Pa Si Mongkol (Wat Pa Ban Puey) Non Kalen Subdistrict, Samrong District, Ubon Ratchathani Province
- Phra Mongkhonkittithada (Amorn Khemjitto) Wat Pa Wiwek (Thamchan) Muang Samsib District, Ubon Ratchathani Province
- Phra Phromwachirayanasophon (Liam Thitthammo) Wat Nong Pa Pong, Non Phueng Subdistrict, Warin Chamrap District, Ubon Ratchathani Province
- Phra Ratchaphiphat Watcharodom (Kham Nissoko) Wat Pa Thai Phatthana, Det Udom District Ubon Ratchathani Province
- Phra Khru Suwannapotikhet (Khun Akkathammo) Wat Pa Pho Suwan, Na Pho Subdistrict, Phibun Mangsahan District, Ubon Ratchathani Province
- Phra Ratchawachiramuni (Prasopchai Kantasilo) Wat Pa Chittaphawan (Fahkram), Khu Khot Subdistrict, Lam Luk Ka District, Pathum Thani Province
- Phra Ratchawachirayan (Anan Akijjano) Wat Marp Jan, Klaeng Subdistrict, Mueang Rayong District, Rayong Province
- Phra Ratchapatcharamanit (Akkaradet Thirachitto) Wat Bunyawat, Bo Thong Subdistrict, Bo Thong District, Chonburi Province
- etc.

== Notable Western students ==
- Ajahn Sumedho, founder and former abbot of Chithurst Buddhist Monastery and Amaravati Buddhist Monastery, Hemel Hempstead, Hertfordshire, England
- Ajahn Khemadhammo, abbot of The Forest Hermitage, Warwickshire, England
- Ajahn Viradhammo, abbot of Tisarana Buddhist Monastery in Perth, Ontario, Canada
- Ajahn Sucitto, retired abbot of Cittaviveka monastery. A Dhamma writer.
- Ajahn Pasanno, retired abbot of Abhayagiri Monastery, Redwood Valley, California, USA
- Ajahn Amaro, abbot of Amaravati Monastery, Amaravati Buddhist Monastery, Hemel Hempstead, Hertfordshire England
- Ajahn Brahmavamso, abbot of Bodhinyana Monastery, Perth, Western Australia
- Ajahn Jayasaro, author of Stillness Flowing, the biography of Ajahn Chah, and former abbot of Wat Pah Nanachat
- Jack Kornfield, co-founder of Insight Meditation Society, Barre, Massachusetts, USA and Spirit Rock Meditation Center in Woodacre, California, USA

== Bibliography ==
- Still Flowing Water: Eight Dhamma Talks (Thanissaro Bhikkhu, ed.). Metta Forest Monastery (2007).
- The Path to Peace. The Sangha, Wat Pah Nanachat (1996).
- Clarity of Insight. The Sangha, Wat Pah Nanachat (2000).
- A Still Forest Pool: The Insight Meditation of Achaan Chah (Jack Kornfield ed.). Theosophical Publishing House (1985). ISBN 0-8356-0597-3.
- Being Dharma: The Essence of the Buddha's Teachings. Shambahla Press, 2001. ISBN 1-57062-808-4.
- Food for the Heart (Ajahn Amaro, ed.). Boston: Wisdom Publications, 2002. ISBN 0-86171-323-0.
- Everything Is Teaching Us. Amaravati Publications, 2018. ISBN 978-1-78432-106-2.
- Living Dhamma. Amaravati Publications, 2018. ISBN 978-1-78432-099-7.
- A Taste of Freedom. Amaravati Publications, 2018. ISBN 978-1-78432-098-0.
- On Meditation. Amaravati Publications, 2018. ISBN 978-1-78432-101-7
- Bodhinyana. Amaravati Publications, 2018.ISBN 978-1-78432-097-3

=== Published by Buddhist Publication Society ===
- Meditation: A Collection of Talks on Cultivating the Mind
- The Training Of The Heart (BL107)
- Our Real Home (BL111)
