= Thai Forest Tradition =

Lineage of Theravada Buddhist monasticism

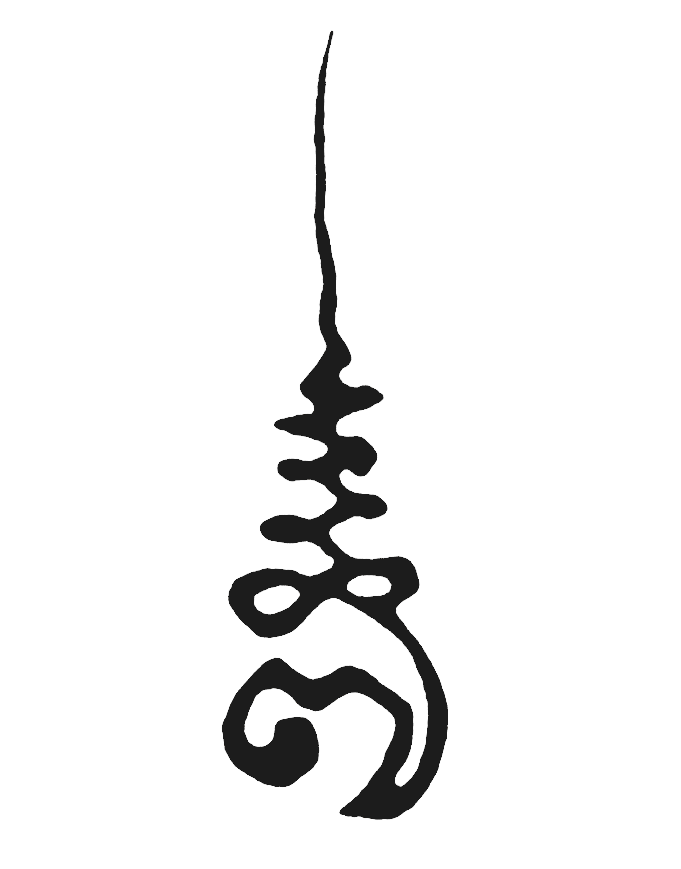
- Type: Dhamma Lineage
- School: Theravada Buddhism
- Formation: c. 1900; Isan, Thailand
- Lineage Heads: Ajahn Sao Kantasīlo, Ajahn Mun Bhuridatta (c. 1900–1949); Ajahn Thate Desaransi (1949–1994); Ajahn Maha Bua Ñāṇasampaṇṇo (1994–2011); Ajahn Chah Subhatto (see: Forest Tradition of Ajahn Chah)
- Founding Maxims: The customs of the noble ones (ariyavamsa); The Dhamma in accordance with the Dhamma (dhammanudhammapatipatti)

The Kammaṭṭhāna Forest Tradition of Thailand (from Pali: kammaṭṭhāna [kəmːəʈʈʰaːna] meaning "place of work"), commonly known in the West as the Thai Forest Tradition, is a lineage of Theravada Buddhist monasticism.

The Thai Forest Tradition started around 1900 with Ajahn Mun Bhuridatto, who wanted to practice Buddhist monasticism and its meditative practices according to the normative standards of early Buddhism. After studying with Ajahn Sao Kantasīlo and wandering through the northeast of Thailand, Ajahn Mun reportedly became a Anāgāmi and started to teach in Northeast Thailand. He strove for a revival of the Early Buddhism, insisting on a strict observance of the Buddhist monastic code known as the Vinaya and teaching the practice of jhāna and the realization of nibbāna.

Initially, Ajahn Mun's teachings were met with fierce opposition, but in the 1930s his group was acknowledged as a formal faction of Thai Buddhism, and in the 1950s the relationship with the royal and religious establishment improved. In the 1960s, Western students started to be attracted to the movement, and in the 1970s branch monasteries of the tradition began to be established in the West.

Underlying attitudes of the Thai Forest Tradition include an interest in the empirical effectiveness of practice, the individual's development, and the use of skill in their practice and living.

== History ==
=== The Dhammayut movement (19th century) ===
Before authority was centralized in the 19th and early 20th centuries, the region known today as Thailand was a kingdom of semi-autonomous city-states (Thai: mueang). These kingdoms were all ruled by a hereditary local governor, and while independent, paid tribute to Bangkok, the most powerful central city-state in the region. Each region had its own religious customs according to local tradition, and substantially different forms of Buddhism existed between mueangs. Though all of these local flavors of regional Thai Buddhism evolved their own customary elements relating to local spirit lore, all were shaped by the infusion of Mahayana Buddhism and Indian Tantric traditions, which arrived in the area prior to the fourteenth century. Additionally, many of the monastics in the villages engaged in behavior inconsistent with the Buddhist monastic code (Pali: vinaya), including playing board games, and participating in boat races and water fights.

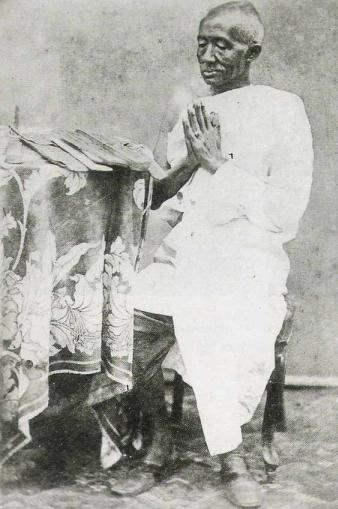
Vajirañāṇo Bhikkhu, later King Mongkut of the Rattanakosin Kingdom, founder of the Dhammayuttika Nikaya

In the 1820s young Prince Mongkut (1804–1866), the future fourth king of the Rattanakosin Kingdom (Siam), was ordained as a Buddhist monk before rising to the throne later in his life. He traveled around the Siamese region and quickly became dissatisfied with the caliber of Buddhist practice he saw around him. He was also concerned about the authenticity of the ordination lineages, and the capacity of the monastic body to act as an agent that generates positive kamma (Pali: puññakkhettam, meaning "merit-field").

Mongkut started to introduce innovations and reforms to a small number of monks, replacing magical practices with rational, scriptural-based doctrine. He and other Siamese elites shared disapproval of the superstitious nature of Buddhism at the time, prompting Mongkut's reforms which took inspiration from his contacts with Western intellectuals. (Note: Sujato's Blog (25 Nov. 2009), Reform) He rejected the local customs and traditions, and instead turned to the Pali Canon, studying the texts and developing his own ideas on them. Doubting the validity of the existing lineages, Mongkut searched for a lineage of monks with an authentic practice, which he found among the Burmese Mon people in the region. He reordained among this group, which formed the basis for the Dhammayut movement. He then went to Sri Lanka to collect a valid record of the Vinaya and began a study group to promote understanding of Classical Buddhist principles. The term "Dhammayut" in Pali ("Thammayut" in Thai) means "Adherents of the Dharma."

Mongkut's reforms were radical, imposing a scriptural orthodoxy on the varied forms of Thai Buddhism of the time, "trying to establish a national identity through religious reform." (Note: Sujato: "Mongkut and those following him have been accused of imposing a scriptural orthodoxy on the diversity of Thai Buddhist forms. There is no doubt some truth to this. It was a form of ‘inner colonialism’, the modern, Westernized culture of Bangkok trying to establish a national identity through religious reform.) A controversial point was Mongkut's belief that nibbana can't be reached in our degenerated times and that the aim of the Buddhist order is to promote a moral way of life and preserve the Buddhist traditions. (Note: Mongkut on nibbana: Thanissaro: "Mongkut himself was convinced that the path to nirvana was no longer open, but that a great deal of merit could be made by reviving at least the outward forms of the earliest Buddhist traditions." * Sujato: "One area where the modernist thinking of Mongkut has been very controversial has been his belief that in our degenerate age, it is impossible to realize the paths and fruits of Buddhism. Rather than aiming for any transcendental goal, our practice of Buddhadhamma is in order to support mundane virtue and wisdom, to uphold the forms and texts of Buddhism. This belief, while almost unheard of in the West, is very common in modern Theravada. It became so mainstream that at one point any reference to Nibbana was removed from the Thai ordination ceremony.)

Mongkut's brother Nangklao, King Rama III, the third king of the Rattanakosin Kingdom, considered Mongkut's involvement with the Mons, an ethnic minority, to be improper, and built a monastery on the outskirts of Bangkok. In 1836, Mongkut became the first abbot of Wat Bowonniwet Vihara, which would become the administrative center of the Thammayut order until the present day.

The early participants of the movement continued to devote themselves to a combination of textual study and meditations they had discovered from the texts they had received. However, Thanissaro notes that none of the monks could make any claims of proving that the doctrine definitively led to awakening.

The Dhammayut reform movement maintained a strong footing as Mongkut later rose to the throne. Over the next several decades the Dhammayut monks would continue with their study and practice.

=== Formative period (around 1900) ===
The Kammaṭṭhāna Forest Tradition started around 1900 with Ajahn Mun Bhuridatto, who studied with Ajahn Sao Kantasīlo, and wanted to practice Buddhist monasticism, and its meditative practices, according to the normative standards of pre-sectarian Buddhism, which Ajahn Mun termed "the customs of the noble ones".

==== Wat Liap monastery and Fifth Reign reforms ====
While ordained in the Dhammayut movement, Ajahn Sao (1861–1941) questioned the impossibility to attain nibbana. He rejected the textual orientation of the Dhammayut movement and set out to bring the dhamma into actual practice. In the late nineteenth century he was posted as abbot of Wat Liap, in Ubon. According to Phra Ajahn Phut Thaniyo, one of Ajahn Sao's students, Ajahn Sao was "not a preacher or a speaker, but a doer," who said very little when teaching his students. He taught his students to "Meditate on the word 'Buddho,'" which would aid in developing concentration and mindfulness of meditation objects. (Note: Phra Ajaan Phut Thaniyo, Ajaan Sao's Teaching. A Reminiscence of Phra Ajaan Sao Kantasilo, translated by Thanissaro Bhikkhu) (Note: Phra Ajaan Phut Thaniyo gives an incomplete account of the meditation instructions of Ajaan Sao. According to Thaniyo, concentration on the word 'Buddho' would make the mind "calm and bright" by entering into concentration. He warned his students not to settle for an empty and still mind, but to "focus on the breath as your object and then simply keep track of it, following it inward until the mind becomes even calmer and brighter." This leads to "threshold concentration" (upacara samadhi), and culminates in "fixed penetration" (appana samadhi), an absolute stillness of mind, in which the awareness of the body disappears, leaving the mind to stand on its own. Reaching this point, the practitioner has to notice when the mind starts to become distracted and focus on the movement of distraction. Thaniyo does not further elaborate.)

Ajahn Mun (1870–1949) went to Wat Liap monastery immediately after being ordained in 1893, where he started to practice kasina-meditation, in which awareness is directed away from the body. While it leads to a state of calm-abiding, it also leads to visions and out-of-body experiences. He then turned to his keeping awareness of his body at all times, taking full sweeps of the body through a walking meditation practice, which leads to a more satisfactory state of calm-abiding.

Ajahn Mun Bhuridatto (left) and Ajahn Sao Kantasīlo (right), founders of the Kammatthana Forest lineage.

During this time, Chulalongkorn (1853–1910), the fifth monarch of the Rattanakosin Kingdom, and his brother Prince Wachirayan, initiated a cultural modernization of the entire region. This modernization included an ongoing campaign to homogenize Buddhism among the villages. Chulalongkorn and Wachiraayan were taught by Western tutors and held distaste for the more mystical aspects of Buddhism. (Note: Thanissaro: "Both Rama V and Prince Vajirañana were trained by European tutors, from whom they had absorbed Victorian attitudes toward rationality, the critical study of ancient texts, the perspective of secular history on the nature of religious institutions, and the pursuit of a “useful” past. As Prince Vajirañana stated in his Biography of the Buddha, ancient texts, such as the Pali Canon, are like mangosteens, with a sweet flesh and bitter rind. The duty of critical scholarship was to extract the flesh and discard the rind. Norms of rationality were the guide to this extraction process. Teachings that were reasonable and useful to modern needs were accepted as the flesh. Stories of miracles and psychic powers were dismissed as part of the rind.) They abandoned Mongkut's search for the noble attainments, indirectly stating that the noble attainments were no longer possible. In an introduction to the Buddhist monastic code written by Wachirayan, he stated that the rule forbidding monks to make claims to superior attainments was no longer relevant.

During this time, the Thai government enacted legislation to group these factions into official monastic fraternities. The monks ordained as part of the Dhammayut reform movement were now part of the Dhammayut order, and all remaining regional monks were grouped together as the Mahanikai order.

==== Wandering non-returner ====
After his stay at Wat Liap, Ajaan Mun wandered through the Northeast. Ajahn Mun still had visions, (Note: Maha Bua: "Sometimes, he felt his body soaring high into the sky where he traveled around for many hours, looking at celestial mansions before coming back down. At other times, he burrowed deep beneath the earth to visit various regions in hell. There he felt profound pity for its unfortunate inhabitants, all experiencing the grievous consequences of their previous actions. Watching these events unfold, he often lost all perspective of the passage of time. In those days, he was still uncertain whether these scenes were real or imaginary. He said that it was only later on, when his spiritual faculties were more mature, that he was able to investigate these matters and understand clearly the definite moral and psychological causes underlying them.) when his concentration and mindfulness were lost, but through trial and error he eventually found a method for taming his mind.

As his mind gained more inner stability, he gradually headed towards Bangkok, consulting his childhood friend Chao Khun Upali on practices pertaining to the development of insight (Pali: paññā, also meaning "wisdom" or "discernment"). He then left for an unspecified period, staying in caves in Lopburi, before returning to Bangkok one final time to consult with Chao Khun Upali, again pertaining to the practice of paññā.

Feeling confident in his paññā practice he left for Sarika Cave. During his stay there, Ajahn Mun was critically ill for several days. After medicines failed to remedy his illness, Ajahn Mun ceased to take medication and resolved to rely on the power of his Buddhist practice. Ajahn Mun investigated the nature of the mind and this pain, until his illness disappeared, and successfully coped with visions featuring a club-wielding demon apparition who claimed he was the owner of the cave. According to forest tradition accounts, Ajahn Mun attained the noble level of non-returner (Pali: "anagami") after subduing this apparition and working through subsequent visions he encountered in the cave.

=== Establishment and resistance (1900s–1930s) ===
==== Establishment ====
Ajahn Mun returned to the Northeast to start teaching, which marked the effective beginning of the Kammatthana tradition. He insisted on a scrupulous observance of the Vinaya, the Buddhist monastic code, and of the protocols, the instructions for the daily activities of the monk. He taught that virtue was a matter of the mind, not of rituals, and that intention forms the essence of virtue, not the proper conduct of rituals. He asserted that meditative concentration was necessary on the Buddhist path and that the practice of jhana and the experience of Nirvana was still possible even in modern times.

==== Resistance ====
Ajahn Mun's approach met with resistance from the religious establishment. He challenged the text-based approach of the city-monks, opposing their claims about the non-attainability of jhāna and nibbāna with his own experience-based teachings.

His report of having reached a noble attainment was met with mixed reactions among the Thai clergy. The ecclesiastical official Ven. Chao Khun Upali held Ajahn Mun in high esteem, which would be a significant factor in the subsequent leeway that state authorities gave him and his students. Tisso Uan (1867–1956), who later rose to Thailand's highest ecclesiastical rank of somdet, thoroughly rejected the authenticity of Ajahn Mun's attainment.

The tension between the forest tradition and the Thammayut administrative hierarchy escalated in 1926 when Tisso Uan attempted to drive a senior Forest Tradition monk named Ajahn Sing—along with his following of 50 monks and 100 nuns and laypeople—out of Ubon, which was under Tisso Uan's jurisdiction. Ajahn Sing refused, saying he and many of his supporters were born there, and they weren't doing anything to harm anyone. After arguments with district officials, the directive was eventually dropped.

=== Institutionalisation and growth (1930s–1990s) ===
==== Acceptance in Bangkok ====
In the late 1930s, Tisso Uan formally recognized the Kammaṭṭhāna monks as a faction. However, even after Ajahn Mun died in 1949, Tisso Uan continued to insist that Ajahn Mun had never been qualified to teach because he hadn't graduated from the government's formal Pali studies courses.

With the passing of Ajahn Mun in 1949, Ajahn Thate Desaransi was designated the de facto head of the Forest Tradition until his death in 1994. The relationship between the Thammayut ecclesia and the Kammaṭṭhāna monks changed in the 1950s when Tisso Uan become ill and Ajahn Lee went to teach meditation to him to help cope with his illness. (Note: Ajahn Lee: "One day he said, "I never dreamed that sitting in samadhi would be so beneficial, but there's one thing that has me bothered. To make the mind still and bring it down to its basic resting level (bhavanga): Isn't this the essence of becoming and birth?" "That's what samadhi is," I told him, "becoming and birth." "But the Dhamma we're taught to practice is for the sake of doing away with becoming and birth. So what are we doing giving rise to more becoming and birth?" "If you don't make the mind take on becoming, it won't give rise to knowledge, because knowledge has to come from becoming if it's going to do away with becoming. This is becoming on a small scale—uppatika bhava—which lasts for a single mental moment. The same holds true with birth. To make the mind still so that samadhi arises for a long mental moment is birth. Say we sit in concentration for a long time until the mind gives rise to the five factors of jhana: That's birth. If you don't do this with your mind, it won't give rise to any knowledge of its own. And when knowledge can't arise, how will you be able to let go of unawareness [avijja]? It'd be very hard. "As I see it," I went on, "most students of the Dhamma really misconstrue things. Whatever comes springing up, they try to cut it down and wipe it out. To me, this seems wrong. It's like people who eat eggs. Some people don't know what a chicken is like: This is unawareness. As soon as they get hold of an egg, they crack it open and eat it. But say they know how to incubate eggs. They get ten eggs, eat five of them and incubate the rest. While the eggs are incubating, that's "becoming." When the baby chicks come out of their shells, that's "birth." If all five chicks survive, then as the years pass it seems to me that the person who once had to buy eggs will start benefiting from his chickens. He'll have eggs to eat without having to pay for them, and if he has more than he can eat he can set himself up in business, selling them. In the end, he'll be able to release himself from poverty. "So it is with practicing samadhi: If you're going to release yourself from becoming, you first have to go live in becoming. If you're going to release yourself from birth, you'll have to know all about your own birth.")

Ajahn Lee Dhammadaro

Tisso Uan eventually recovered, and a friendship between Tisso Uan and Ajahn Lee began, that would cause Tisso Uan to reverse his opinion of the Kammaṭṭhāna tradition, inviting Ajahn Lee to teach in the city. This event marked a turning point in relations between the Dhammayut administration and the Forest Tradition, and interest continued to grow as a friend of Ajahn Maha Bua's named Nyanasamvara rose to the level of somdet and later the Sangharaja of Thailand. Additionally, the clergy who had been drafted as teachers from the Fifth Reign onwards were now being displaced by civilian teaching staff, which left the Dhammayut monks with a crisis of identity.

==== Recording of forest doctrine ====
In the tradition's beginning the founders famously neglected to record their teachings, instead wandering the Thai countryside offering individual instruction to dedicated pupils. However, detailed meditation manuals and treatises on Buddhist doctrine emerged in the late 20th century from Ajahn Mun and Ajahn Sao's first-generation students as the Forest tradition's teachings began to propagate among the urbanities in Bangkok and subsequently take root in the West.

Ajahn Lee, one of Ajahn Mun's students, was instrumental in disseminating Mun's teachings to a wider Thai lay audience. Ajahn Lee wrote several books which recorded the doctrinal positions of the forest tradition and explained broader Buddhist concepts in the Forest Tradition's terms. Ajahn Lee and his students are considered a distinguishable sub-lineage that is sometimes referred to as the "Chanthaburi Line". An influential Western student in the line of Ajahn Lee is Thanissaro Bhikkhu.

Forest monasteries in the South

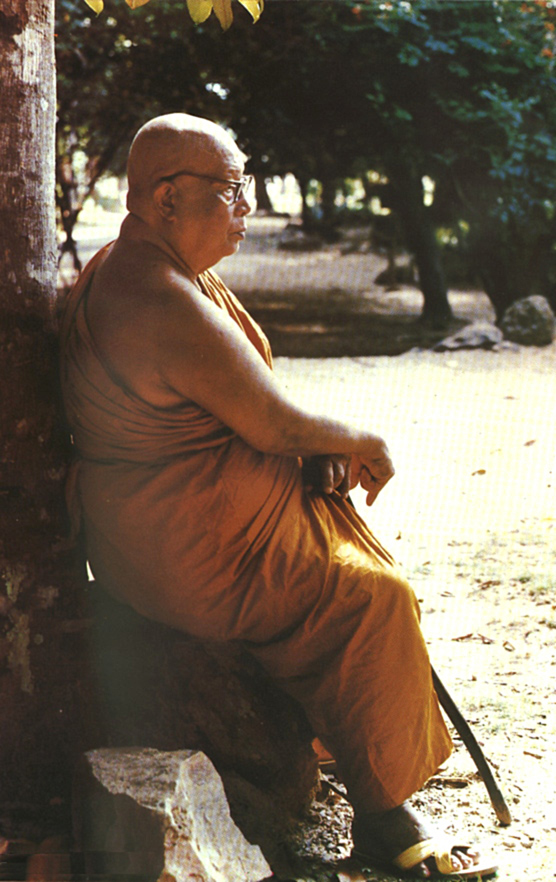
Ajahn Buddhadasa Bhikkhu

Ajahn Buddhadasa Bhikkhu (May 27, 1906 - May 25, 1993) became a Buddhist monk at Wat Ubon, Chaiya, Surat Thani in Thailand on July 29, 1926, when he was twenty years old, in part to follow the tradition of the day and to fulfill his mother’s wishes. His preceptor gave him the Buddhist name “Inthapanyo” which means “The wise one”. He was a Mahanikaya monk and graduated at the third level of Dharma studies in his hometown and in Pali language studies at the third level in Bangkok. After he finished learning the Pali language, he realized that living in Bangkok was not suitable for him because monks and people there did not practice to achieve the heart and core of Buddhism. So he decided to go back to Surat Thani and practice rigorously and taught people to practice well according to the core teachings of the Buddha. Then he established Suanmokkhabālārama (The Grove of the Power of Liberation) in 1932 which is the mountain and forest for 118.61 acres at Pum Riang, Chaiya district, Surat Thani Thailand. It is a forest Dhamma and Vipassana meditation center. In 1989, he founded The Suan Mokkh International Dharma Hermitage for international Vipassana meditation practitioners around the world. There is a 10-day silent meditation retreat that starts on the 1st of each month for the whole year which is free, of no charge for international practitioners who are interested in practicing meditation. He was a central monk in the popularization of the Thai Forest Tradition in the South of Thailand. He was a great Dhamma author who wrote many well-known Dhamma books: Handbook for Mankind, Heart-wood from the Bo Tree, Keys to Natural Truth, Me and Mine, Mindfulness of Breathing and The A, B, Cs of Buddhism etc. On October 20, 2005, The United Nations Educational, Scientific and Cultural Organization (UNESCO) announced praise to “Buddhadasa Bhikkhu”, an important person in the world and celebrated the 100th anniversary on May 27, 2006. They held an academic activity to disseminate the Buddhist principles that Ajahn Buddhadasa had taught people around the world. So, he was the practitioner of a great Thai Forest Tradition who practiced well and spread Dhammas for people around the world to realize the core and heart of Buddhism.

==== Forest monasteries in the West ====
Ajahn Chah (1918–1992) was a central person in the popularisation of the Thai Forest Tradition in the west. (Note: Zuidema: "Ajahn Chah (1918–1992) is the most famous Thai Forest teacher. He is acknowledged to have played an instrumental role in spreading the Thai Forest tradition to the west and in making this tradition an international phenomenon in his lifetime.") In contrast to most members of the Forest Tradition he was not a Dhammayut monk, but a Mahanikaya monk. He only spent one weekend with Ajahn Mun, but had teachers within the Mahanikaya who had more exposure to Ajahn Mun. His connection to the Forest Tradition was publicly recognized by Ajahn Maha Bua. The community that he founded is formally referred to as The Forest Tradition of Ajahn Chah.

In 1967, Ajahn Chah founded Wat Pah Pong. That same year, an American monk from another monastery, Venerable Sumedho (Robert Karr Jackman, later Ajahn Sumedho) came to stay with Ajahn Chah at Wat Pah Pong. He found out about the monastery from one of Ajahn Chah's existing monks who happened to speak "a little bit of English". In 1975, Ajahn Chah and Sumedho founded Wat Pah Nanachat, an international forest monastery in Ubon Ratchatani which offers services in English.

In the 1980s the Forest Tradition of Ajahn Chah expanded to the West with the founding of Amaravati Buddhist Monastery in the UK. Ajahn Chah stated that the spread of Communism in Southeast Asia motivated him to establish the Forest Tradition in the West. The Forest Tradition of Ajahn Chah has since expanded to cover Canada, Germany, Italy, New Zealand, Brazil, and the United States.

=== Involvement in politics (1994–2011) ===
==== Royal patronage and instruction to the elite ====
With the passing of Ajahn Thate in 1994, Ajahn Maha Bua was designated the new Ajahn Yai. By this time, the Forest Tradition's authority had been fully routinized, and Ajahn Maha Bua had grown a following of influential conservative-loyalist Bangkok elites. He was introduced to the Queen and King by Somdet Nyanasamvara Suvaddhano (Charoen Khachawat), instructing them how to meditate.

==== Forest closure ====
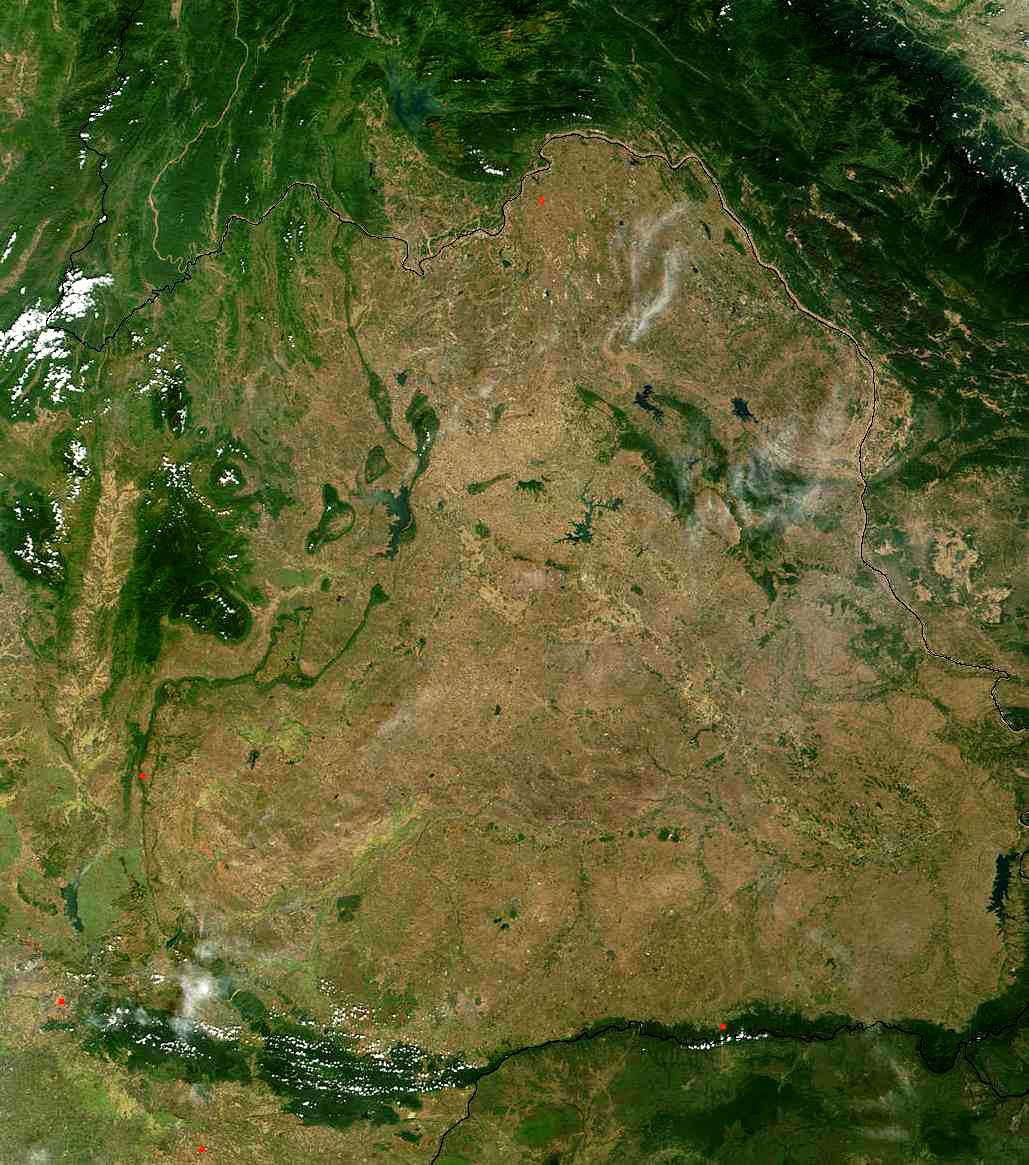
Satellite photo of Northeast Thailand: The once-lush area of Isan, where the Forest Tradition began, has now been almost entirely deforested.

In recent times, the Forest Tradition has undergone a crisis surrounding the destruction of forests in Thailand. Since the Forest Tradition had gained significant pull from the royal and elite support in Bangkok, the Thai Forestry Bureau decided to deed large tracts of forested land to Forest Monasteries, knowing that the forest monks would preserve the land as a habitat for Buddhist practice. The land surrounding these monasteries have been described as "forest islands" surrounded by barren clear-cut area.

==== Save Thai Nation ====
In the midst of the Thai Financial crisis in the late 1990s, Ajahn Maha Bua initiated Save Thai Nation—a campaign which aimed to raise capital to underwrite the Thai currency. By the year 2000, 3.097 tonnes of gold was collected. By the time of Ajahn Maha Bua's death in 2011, an estimated 12 tonnes of gold had been collected, valued at approximated US$500 million. 10.2 million dollars of foreign exchange was also donated to the campaign. All proceeds were handed over to the Thai central bank to back the Thai Baht.

The Thai administration under Prime Minister Chuan Leekpai attempted to thwart the Save Thai Nation campaign in the late 1990s. This led to Ajahn Maha Bua's striking back with heavy criticism, which is cited as a contributing factor to the ousting of Chuan Leekpai and the election of Thaksin Shinawatra as prime minister in 2001. The Dhammayut hierarchy, teaming-up with the Mahanikaya hierarchy and seeing the political influence that Ajahn Maha Bua could wield, felt threatened and began to take action. (Note: Thanissaro: "The Mahanikaya hierarchy, which had long been antipathetic to the Forest monks, convinced the Dhammayut hierarchy that their future survival lay in joining forces against the Forest monks, and against Ajaan Mahabua in particular. Thus the last few years have witnessed a series of standoffs between the Bangkok hierarchy and the Forest monks led by Ajaan Mahabua, in which government-run media have personally attacked Ajaan Mahabua. The hierarchy has also proposed a series of laws—a Sangha Administration Act, a land-reform bill, and a “special economy” act—that would have closed many of the Forest monasteries, stripped the remaining Forest monasteries of their wilderness lands, or made it legal for monasteries to sell their lands. These laws would have brought about the effective end of the Forest tradition, at the same time preventing the resurgence of any other forest tradition in the future. So far, none of these proposals have become law, but the issues separating the Forest monks from the hierarchy are far from settled.")

In the late 2000s bankers at the Thai central bank attempted to consolidate the bank's assets and move the proceeds from the Save Thai Nation campaign into the ordinary accounts which discretionary spending comes out of. The bankers received pressure from Ajahn Maha Bua's supporters which effectively prevented them from doing this. On the subject, Ajahn Maha Bua said that "it is clear that combining the accounts is like tying the necks of all Thais together and throwing them into the sea; the same as turning the land of the nation upside down."

In addition to Ajahn Maha Bua's activism for Thailand's economy, his monastery is estimated to have donated some 600 million Baht (US$19 million) to charitable causes.

==== Politic interest and death of Ajahn Maha Bua ====
Throughout the 2000s, Ajahn Maha Bua was accused of political leanings—first from Chuan Leekpai supporters, and then receiving criticism from the other side after his vehement condemnations of Thaksin Shinawatra. (Note: On being accused of aspiring to political ambitions, Ajaan Maha Bua replied: "If someone squanders the nation's treasure [...] what do you think this is? People should fight against this kind of stealing. Don't be afraid of becoming political, because the nation's heart (hua-jai) is there (within the treasury). The issue is bigger than politics. This is not to destroy the nation. There are many kinds of enemies. When boxers fight do they think about politics? No. They only think about winning. This is Dhamma straight. Take Dhamma as first principle.")

Ajahn Maha Bua was the last of Ajahn Mun's prominent first-generation students. He died in 2011. In his will he requested that all of the donations from his funeral be converted to gold and donated to the Central Bank—an additional 330 million Baht and 78 kilograms of gold.

== Practices ==
=== Meditation practices ===
The purpose of practice is to attain the deathless (Pali: amata-dhamma), i.e. Nibbāna. According to the Thai Forest Tradition's exposition, awareness of the deathless is boundless and unconditioned and cannot be conceptualized, and must be arrived at through mental training which includes states of meditative concentration (Pali: jhana). Forest teachers thus directly challenge the notion of "dry insight" (insight without any development of concentration) and teach that nibbāna must be arrived at through mental training which includes deep states of meditative concentration (Pali: jhāna), and "exertion and striving" to "cut" or "clear the path" through the "tangle" of defilements, setting awareness free, and thus allowing one to see them clearly for what they are, eventually leading one to be released from these defilements.

==== Kammaṭṭhāna — The Place of Work ====
Kammaṭṭhāna, (Pali: meaning “place of work”) refers to the whole of the practice to ultimately eradicate defilement from the mind. (Note: Ajaan Maha Bua: "The word “kammaṭṭhāna” has been well known among Buddhists for a long time and the accepted meaning is: “the place of work (or basis of work).” But the “work” here is a very important work and means the work of demolishing the world of birth (bhava); thus, demolishing (future) births, kilesas, taṇhā, and the removal and destruction of all avijjā from our hearts. All this is in order that we may be free from dukkha. In other words, free from birth, old age, pain and death, for these are the bridges that link us to the round of saṁsāra (vaṭṭa), which is never easy for any beings to go beyond and be free. This is the meaning of “work” in this context rather than any other meaning, such as work as is usually done in the world. The result that comes from putting this work into practice, even before reaching the final goal, is happiness in the present and in future lives. Therefore, those [monks] who are interested and who practise these ways of Dhamma are usually known as Dhutanga Kammaṭṭhāna Bhikkhus, a title of respect given with sincerity by fellow Buddhists.)

The practice that monks in the tradition generally begin with are meditations on what Ajahn Mun called the five "root meditation themes": the hair of the head, the hair of the body, the nails, the teeth, and the skin. One of the purposes of meditating on these externally visible aspects of the body is to counter the infatuation with the body and to develop a sense of dispassion. Of the five, the skin is described as being especially significant. Ajahn Mun writes, "When we get infatuated with the human body, the skin is what we are infatuated with. When we conceive of the body as being beautiful and attractive, and develop love, desire, and longing for it, it's because of what we conceive of the skin."

Advanced meditations include the classical themes of contemplation and mindfulness of breathing:

- The ten recollections: a list of ten meditation themes considered especially significant by the Buddha.
- The asubha contemplations: contemplations of foulness for combating sensual desire.
- The brahmaviharas: assertions of goodwill for all beings to combat ill will.
- The four satipatthana: frames of reference to get the mind into deep concentration

Mindfulness immersed in the body and mindfulness of in-and-out breathing (ānāpānasati) are both part of the ten recollections and the four satipatthana and are commonly given special attention as primary themes for a meditator to focus on.

=== Monastic routine ===
==== Precepts and ordination ====
There are several precept levels: Five Precepts, Eight Precepts, Ten Precepts, and the patimokkha. The Five Precepts (Pañcaśīla in Sanskrit and Pañcasīla in Pāli) are practiced by laypeople, either for a given period or for a lifetime. The Eight Precepts are a more rigorous practice for laypeople. Ten Precepts are the training rules for sāmaṇeras and sāmaṇerīs (novitiate monks and nuns). The Patimokkha is the basic Theravada code of monastic discipline, consisting of 227 rules for bhikkhus and 311 for nuns bhikkhunis (nuns).

Temporary or short-term ordination is so common in Thailand that men who have never been ordained are sometimes referred to as "unfinished." Long-term or lifetime ordination is deeply respected. The ordination process usually begins as an anagarika, in white robes.

==== Customs ====
Monks in the tradition are typically addressed as "Venerable", alternatively with the Thai Ayya or Taan (for men). Any monk may be addressed as "bhante" regardless of seniority. For Sangha elders who have contributed significantly to their tradition or order, the title Luang Por (Thai: Venerable Father) may be used.

According to The Isaan: "In Thai culture, it is considered impolite to point the feet toward a monk or a statue in the shrine room of a monastery." In Thailand, monks are usually greeted by lay people with the wai gesture, though, according to Thai custom, monks are not supposed to wai laypeople. When making offerings to the monks, it is best not to stand while offering something to a monk who is sitting down.

==== Daily routine ====
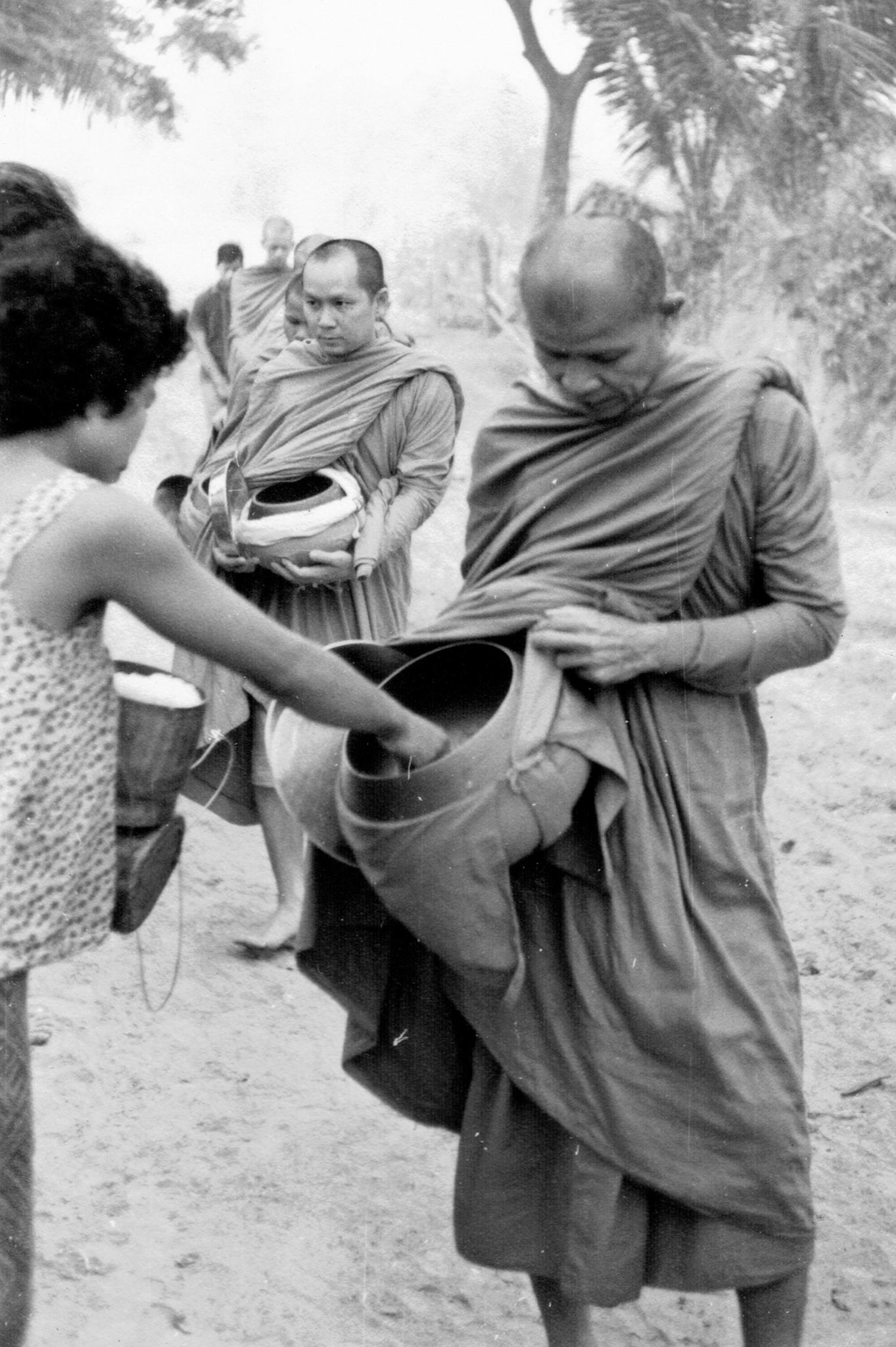
Ajahn Maha Bua led the monks (in this photo, he was followed by Phra Maha Amborn Ambaro, later the 20th Supreme Patriarch of Thailand) for morning alms around Ban Taad, Udon Thani, in 1965.

All Thai monasteries generally have a morning and evening chant, which usually takes an hour long for each, and each morning and evening chant may be followed by a meditation session, usually around an hour as well.

At Thai monasteries the monks will go for alms early in the morning, sometimes around 6:00 AM, although monasteries such as Wat Pah Nanachat and Wat Mettavanaram start around 8:00 AM and 8:30 AM, respectively. At Dhammayut monasteries (and some Maha Nikaya forest monasteries, including Wat Pah Nanachat), monks will eat just one meal per day. For young children it is customary for the parent to help them scoop food into monks bowls.

At Dhammayut monasteries, anumodana (Pali, rejoicing together) is a chant performed by the monks after a meal to recognize the morning's offerings, as well as the monks' approval for the lay people's choice of generating merit (Pali: puñña) by their generosity towards the Sangha. (Note: Among the thirteen verses to the Anumodana chant, three stanzas are chanted as part of every Anumodana, as follows: 1. (LEADER): Yathā vārivahā pūrā Paripūrenti sāgaraṃ Evameva ito dinnaṃ Petānaṃ upakappati Icchitaṃ patthitaṃ tumhaṃ Khippameva samijjhatu Sabbe pūrentu saṃkappā Cando paṇṇaraso yathā Mani jotiraso yathā. / Just as rivers full of water fill the ocean full, Even so does that here given benefit the dead (the hungry shades). May whatever you wish or want quickly come to be, May all your aspirations be fulfilled, as the moon on the fifteenth (full moon) day, or as a radiant, bright gem.; 2. (ALL): Sabbītiyo vivajjantu Sabba-rogo vinassatu Mā te bhavatvantarāyo Sukhī dīghāyuko bhava Abhivādana-sīlissa Niccaṃ vuḍḍhāpacāyino Cattāro dhammā vaḍḍhanti Āyu vaṇṇo sukhaṃ balaṃ. / May all distresses be averted, may every disease be destroyed, May there be no dangers for you, May you be happy & live long. For one of respectful nature who constantly honors the worthy, Four qualities increase: long life, beauty, happiness, strength.; 3.: Sabba-roga-vinimutto Sabba-santāpa-vajjito Sabba-vera-matikkanto Nibbuto ca tuvaṃ bhava / May you be: freed from all disease, safe from all torment, beyond all animosity, & unbound.)

==== Retreats ====
Dhutanga (meaning "austere practice" in Pāli, tudong in Thai) is a word generally used in the commentaries to refer to the thirteen ascetic practices. Thai Buddhism has been adapted to refer to extended periods of wandering in the countryside, where monks will take one or more of these ascetic practices. During these periods, monks will live off of whatever is given to them by laypersons they encounter during the trip and sleep wherever they can. Sometimes monks bring a large umbrella tent with attached mosquito netting known as a crot (also spelled krot, clot, or klod). The crot usually has a hook on the top so that it may be hung on a line between two trees.

== Teachings ==
=== Original mind ===
The mind (Pali: citta, mano, used interchangeably as "heart" or "mind" en masse), within the context of the Forest Tradition, refers to the most essential aspect of an individual, that carries the responsibility of "taking on" or "knowing" mental preoccupations. (Note: This characterization deviates from what is conventionally known in the West as mind.) While the activities associated with thinking are often included when talking about the mind, they are considered mental processes separate from this essential knowing nature, which is sometimes termed the "primal nature of the mind". (Note: The assertion that the mind comes first was explained to Ajaan Mun's pupils in a talk, which was given in a style of wordplay derived from an Isan song-form known as maw lam: "The two elements, namo, [water and earth elements, i.e. the body] when mentioned by themselves, aren't adequate or complete. We have to rearrange the vowels and consonants as follows: Take the a from the n, and give it to the m; take the o from the m and give it to the n, and then put the ma in front of the no. This gives us mano, the heart. Now we have the body together with the heart, and this is enough to be used as the root foundation for the practice. Mano, the heart, is primal, the great foundation. Everything we do or say comes from the heart, as stated in the Buddha's words: mano-pubbangama dhamma mano-settha mano-maya 'All dhammas are preceded by the heart, dominated by the heart, made from the heart.' The Buddha formulated the entire Dhamma and Vinaya from out of this great foundation, the heart. So when his disciples contemplate in accordance with the Dhamma and Vinaya until namo is perfectly clear, then mano lies at the end point of formulation. In other words, it lies beyond all formulations. All supposings come from the heart. Each of us has his or her own load, which we carry as supposings and formulations in line with the currents of the flood (ogha), to the point where they give rise to unawareness (avijja), the factor that creates states of becoming and birth, all from our not being wise to these things, from our deludedly holding them all to be 'me' or 'mine'.)

The Ballad of Liberation from the Khandas (Excerpt)

"The object of the unmoving heart,

still & at respite,
quiet & clear.

No longer intoxicated,
no longer feverish,
its desires all uprooted,
its uncertainties shed,
its entanglement with the khandas
all ended & appeased,
the gears of the three levels of the cos-
mos all broken,
overweening desire thrown away,
its loves brought to an end,
with no more possessiveness,
all troubles cured
as the heart had aspired."

— by Phra Ajaan Mun Bhuridatta, date unknown

Original Mind is considered to be radiant, or luminous (Pali: "pabhassara"). Teachers in the forest tradition assert that the mind simply "knows and does not die." (Note: Maha Bua: "... the natural power of the mind itself is that it knows and does not die. This deathlessness is something that lies beyond disintegration [...] when the mind is cleansed so that it is fully pure and nothing can become involved with it—that no fear appears in the mind at all. Fear doesn’t appear. Courage doesn’t appear. All that appears is its own nature by itself, just its own timeless nature. That’s all. This is the genuine mind. ‘Genuine mind’ here refers only to the purity or the ‘saupādisesa-nibbāna’ of the arahants. Nothing else can be called the ‘genuine mind’ without reservations or hesitations. ") The mind is also a fixed-phenomenon (Pali: "thiti-dhamma"); the mind itself does not move or follow out after its preoccupations, but rather receives them in place. Since the mind as a phenomenon often eludes attempts to define it, the mind is often simply described in terms of its activities. (Note: Ajahn Chah: "The mind isn’t 'is' anything. What would it 'is'? We’ve come up with the supposition that whatever receives preoccupations—good preoccupations, bad preoccupations, whatever—we call “heart” or 'mind.' Like the owner of a house: Whoever receives the guests is the owner of the house. The guests can’t receive the owner. The owner has to stay put at home. When guests come to see him, he has to receive them. So who receives preoccupations? Who lets go of preoccupations? Who knows anything? [Laughs] That’s what we call 'mind.' But we don’t understand it, so we talk, veering off course this way and that: 'What is the mind? What is the heart?' We get things way too confused. Don’t analyze it so much. What is it that receives preoccupations? Some preoccupations don’t satisfy it, and so it doesn’t like them. Some preoccupations it likes and some it doesn’t. Who is that—who likes and doesn’t like? Is there something there? Yes. What’s it like? We don’t know. Understand? That thing... That thing is what we call the “mind.” Don’t go looking far away.")

The primal or original mind in itself is however not considered to be equivalent to the awakened mind but rather as a basis for the emergence of mental formations, it is not to be confused for a metaphysical statement of a true self and its radiance being an emanation of avijjā it (the radiance) must eventually be let go of.

Ajahn Mun further argued that there is a unique class of "objectless" or "themeless" consciousness specific to Nirvana, which differs from the consciousness aggregate. Scholars in Bangkok at the time of Ajahn Mun stated that an individual is wholly composed of and defined by the five aggregates, (Note: The five khandas (Pali: pañca khandha) describes how consciousness (vinnana) is conditioned by the body and its senses (rupa, "form") which perceive (sanna) objects and the associated feelings (vedana) that arise with sense-contact, and lead to the "fabrications" (sankhara), that is, craving, clinging and becoming.) while the Pali Canon states that the aggregates are completely ended during the experience of Nirvana.

=== Twelve nidanas and rebirth ===
The twelve nidanas describe how, in a continuous process, (Note: Ajaan Mun says: "In other words, these things will have to keep on arising and giving rise to each other continually. They are thus called sustained or sustaining conditions because they support and sustain one another.") avijja ("ignorance," "unawareness") leads to the mind's preoccupation with its contents and the associated feelings that arise from sense-contact. This absorption darkens the mind and becomes a "defilement" (Pali: kilesa), which lead to craving and clinging (Pali: upadana). This in turn leads to becoming, which conditions birth.

While birth is traditionally explained as rebirth in a new life, it is also explained in Thai Buddhism as the birth of self-view, which gives rise to renewed clinging and craving.

== Teachers ==
=== Ajahn Mun ===
When Ajahn Mun returned to the Northeast to start teaching, he brought a set of radical ideas, many of which clashed with what scholars in Bangkok were saying at the time:

- Like Mongkut, Ajahn Mun stressed the importance of scrupulous observance of the Buddhist monastic code (Pali: Vinaya). Ajahn Mun went further, and also stressed what are called the protocols: instructions for how a monk should go about daily activities such as keeping his hut, interacting with other people, etc.
  Ajahn Mun also taught that virtue was a matter of the mind, and that intention forms the essence of virtue. This ran counter to what people in Bangkok said at the time, that virtue was a matter of ritual, and by conducting the proper ritual one gets good results.
- Ajahn Mun asserted that the practice of jhana was still possible even in modern times, and that meditative concentration was necessary on the Buddhist path. Ajahn Mun stated that one's meditation topic must be keeping in line with one's temperament—everyone is different, so the meditation method used should be different for everybody. Ajahn Mun said the meditation topic one chooses should be congenial and enthralling, but also give one a sense of unease and dispassion for ordinary living and the sensual pleasures of the world.
- Ajahn Mun said that not only was the practice of jhana possible, but the experience of Nirvana was too. He stated that Nirvana was characterized by a state of activityless consciousness, distinct from the consciousness aggregate.
  To Ajahn Mun, reaching this mode of consciousness is the goal of the teaching—yet this consciousness transcends the teachings. Ajahn Mun asserted that the teachings are abandoned at the moment of Awakening, in opposition to the predominant scholarly position that Buddhist teachings are confirmed at the moment of Awakening. Along these lines, Ajahn Mun rejected the notion of an ultimate teaching, and argued that all teachings were conventional—no teaching carried a universal truth. Only the experience of Nirvana, as it is directly witnessed by the observer, is absolute.

=== Ajahn Lee ===
Ajahn Lee emphasized his metaphor of Buddhist practice as a skill, and reintroduced the Buddha's idea of skillfulness—acting in ways that emerge from having trained the mind and heart. Ajahn Lee said that good and evil both exist naturally in the world, and that the skill of the practice is ferreting out good and evil, or skillfulness from unskillfulness. The idea of "skill" refers to a distinction in Asian countries between what is called warrior-knowledge (skills and techniques) and scribe-knowledge (ideas and concepts). Ajahn Lee brought some of his own unique perspectives to Forest Tradition teachings:

- Ajahn Lee reaffirmed that meditative concentration (samadhi) was necessary, yet further distinguished between right concentration and various forms of what he called wrong concentration—techniques where the meditator follows awareness out of the body after visions, or forces awareness down to a single point were considered by Ajahn Lee as off-track.
- Ajahn Lee stated that discernment (panna) was mostly a matter of trial-and-error. He used the metaphor of basket-weaving to describe this concept: you learn from your teacher, and from books, basically how a basket is supposed to look, and then you use trial-and-error to produce a basket that is in line with what you have been taught about how baskets should be. These teachings from Ajahn Lee correspond to the factors of the first jhana known as directed-thought (Pali: "vitakka"), and evaluation (Pali: "vicara").
- Ajahn Lee said that the qualities of virtue that are worked on correspond to the qualities that need to be developed in concentration. Ajahn Lee would say things like "don't kill off your good mental qualities", or "don't steal the bad mental qualities of others", relating the qualities of virtue to mental qualities in one's meditation.

=== Ajahn Maha Bua ===
Ajahn Mun and Ajahn Lee would describe obstacles that commonly occurred in meditation but would not explain how to get through them, forcing students to come up with solutions on their own. Additionally, they were generally very private about their own meditative attainments.

Ajahn Maha Bua, on the other hand, saw what he considered to be a lot of strange ideas being taught about meditation in Bangkok in the later decades of the 20th century. For that reason Ajahn Maha Bua decided to vividly describe how each noble attainment is reached, even though doing so indirectly revealed that he was confident he had attained a noble level. Though the Vinaya prohibits a monk from directly revealing ones own or another's attainments to laypeople while that person is still alive, Ajahn Maha Bua wrote in Ajahn Mun's posthumous biography that he was convinced that Ajahn Mun was an arahant. Thanissaro Bhikkhu remarks that this was a significant change of the teaching etiquette within the Forest Tradition.

- Ajahn Maha Bua's primary metaphor for Buddhist practice was that it was a battle against the defilements. Just as soldiers might invent ways to win battles that aren't found in military history texts, one might invent ways to subdue defilement. Whatever technique one could come up with—whether it was taught by one's teacher, found in the Buddhist texts, or made up on the spot—if it helped with a victory over the defilements, it counted as a legitimate Buddhist practice.
- Ajahn Maha Bua is widely known for his teachings on dealing with physical pain. For a period, Ajahn Maha Bua had a student who was dying of cancer, and Ajahn Maha Bua gave a series on talks surrounding the perceptions that people have that create mental problems surrounding the pain. Ajahn Maha Bua said that these incorrect perceptions can be changed by posing questions about the pain in the mind. (i.e. "what color is the pain? does the pain have bad intentions to you?" "Is the pain the same thing as the body? What about the mind?")
- There was a widely publicized incident in Thailand where monks in the North of Thailand were publicly stating that Nirvana is the true self, and scholar monks in Bangkok were stating that Nirvana is not-self. (see: Dhammakaya Movement)
  At one point, Ajahn Maha Bua was asked whether Nirvana was self or not-self and he replied "Nirvana is Nirvana, it is neither self nor not-self". Ajahn Maha Bua stated that not-self is merely a perception that is used to pry one away from infatuation with the concept of a self, and that once this infatuation is gone the idea of not-self must be dropped as well.

== Related traditions ==
Related Forest Traditions are also found in other predominantly Buddhist Asian countries, including the Sri Lankan Forest Tradition of Sri Lanka, the Taungpulu Forest Tradition of Myanmar, and a related Lao Forest Tradition in Laos.

== See also ==
- Early Buddhist schools
- Early Buddhist texts
- Dhammayuttika Nikaya
- Maha Nikaya
- Forest Tradition of Ajahn Chah
- Galduwa Forest Tradition
- Sri Lankan Forest Tradition

== Sources ==
=== Printed sources ===
Primary sources

- Abhayagiri Foundation (2015), Origins of Abhayagiri
- Access to Insight (2013), Theravada Buddhism: A Chronology, Access to Insight
- Bodhisaddha Forest Monastery, The Ajahn Chah lineage: spreading Dhamma to the West
- Chah, Ajahn (2013), Still Flowing Water: Eight Dhamma Talks (PDF), Abhayagiri Foundation, archived from the original (PDF) on 2017-07-22, translated from Thai by Thanissaro Bhikkhu.
- Chah, Ajahn (2010), Not for Sure: Two Dhamma Talks, Abhayagiri Foundation, translated from Thai by Thanissaro Bhikkhu.
- Ajahn Chah (2006). A Taste of Freedom: Selected Dhamma Talks. Buddhist Publication Society. ISBN 978-955-24-0033-9.
- Kornfield, Jack (2008), The Wise Heart: Buddhist Psychology for the West, Random House
- Lee Dhammadaro, Ajahn (2000), Keeping the Breath in Mind and Lessons in Samadhi, Access to Insight
- Lee Dhammadaro, Ajahn (2011), Frames of Reference (PDF), Dhammatalks.org, archived from the original (PDF) on 2017-07-22
- Lee Dhammadaro, Ajahn (2012a), The Autobiography of Phra Ajaan Lee (PDF), Dhammatalks.org, archived from the original (PDF) on 2017-07-22
- Lee Dhammadaro, Ajahn (2012b), Basic Themes (PDF), Dhammatalks.org, archived from the original (PDF) on 2017-07-22
- Maha Bua Nyanasampanno, Ajahn (2004), Venerable Ācariya Mun Bhuridatta Thera: A Spiritual Biography (PDF), Forest Dhamma Books, archived from the original on 2018-05-08
- Maha Bua Nyanasampanno, Ajahn (2005), Arahattamagga, Arahattaphala: the Path to Arahantship – A Compilation of Venerable Acariya Maha Boowa's Dhamma Talks about His Path of Practice (PDF), Forest Dhamma Books, archived from the original (PDF) on 2009-03-27
- Maha Bua Nyanasampanno, Ajahn (2010), Patipada: Venerable Acariya Mun's Path of Practice, Wisdom Library
- Mun Bhuridatta, Ajahn (2016), A Heart Released (PDF), Dhammatalks.org, archived from the original (PDF) on 2017-07-22
- Phut Thaniyo, Ajaan (2013), Ajaan Sao's Teaching: A Reminiscence of Phra Ajaan Sao Kantasilo, Access to Insight (Legacy Edition)
- Sujato (2008), Original Mind Controversy, archived from the original on 2021-12-21
- Sumedho, Ajahn (2007), Thirty years from Hampstead (interview), The Forest Sangha Newsletter, archived from the original on 2016-01-07
- Thanissaro (2010), The Customs of the Noble Ones, Access To Insight
- Thanissaro (2006), The Traditions of the Noble Ones (PDF), dhammatalks.org
- Thanissaro (2006), Legends of Somdet Toh, Access to Insight
- Thanissaro (2011), Wings to Awakening, Access to Insight
- Thanissaro (2013), With Each and Every Breath, Access to Insight
- Thanissaro (2005), Jhana Not by the Numbers, Access to Insight
- Thanissaro (2015), Wilderness Wisdom, The Distinctive Teachings of the Thai Forest Tradition, University of the West
- Thate Desaransi, Ajahn (1994), Buddho, Access to Insight
- Zhi Yun Cai (Fall 2014), Doctrinal Analysis of the Origin and Evolution of the Thai Kammatthana Tradition with a Special Reference to the Present Kammatthana Ajahns, University of the West

Secondary sources

- Bruce, Robert (1969). "King Mongkut of Siam and his Treaty with Britain". Journal of the Hong Kong Branch of the Royal Asiatic Society. 9. Royal Asiatic Society Hong Kong Branch: 88–100. JSTOR 23881479.
- Buswell, Robert; Lopez, Donald S. (2013). The Princeton Dictionary of Buddhism. Princeton University Press. ISBN 978-0-691-15786-3.
- "Rattanakosin Period (1782 -present)". GlobalSecurity.org.
- Gundzik, Jephraim (2004), Thaksin's populist economics buoy Thailand, Asia Times, archived from the original on 2004-08-15
- Harvey, Peter (2013), An Introduction to Buddhism: Teachings, History and Practices, Cambridge University Press, ISBN 9780521859424
- Lopez, Alan Robert (2016), Buddhist Revivalist Movements: Comparing Zen Buddhism and the Thai Forest Movement, Palgrave Macmillan US, doi:10.1057/978-1-137-54086-7, ISBN 978-1-137-54349-3
- McDaniel, Justin Thomas (2011), The Lovelorn Ghost and the Magical Monk: Practicing Buddhism in Modern Thailand, Columbia University Press
- Orloff, Rich (2004), "Being a Monk: A Conversation with Thanissaro Bhikkhu", Oberlin Alumni Magazine, vol. 99, no. 4
- Pali Text Society, The (2015), The Pali Text Society's Pali-English Dictionary
- Piker, Steven (1975), "Modernizing Implications of 19th Century Reforms in the Thai Sangha", Contributions to Asian Studies, Volume 8: The Psychological Study of Theravada Societies, E.J. Brill, ISBN 9004043063
- Quli, Natalie (2008), "Multiple Buddhist Modernisms: Jhana in Convert Theravada" (PDF), Pacific World 10:225–249
- Robinson, Richard H.; Johnson, Willard L.; Ṭhānissaro Bhikkhu (2005). Buddhist Religions: A Historical Introduction. Wadsworth/Thomson Learning. ISBN 978-0-534-55858-1.
- Schuler, Barbara (2014). Environmental and Climate Change in South and Southeast Asia: How are Local Cultures Coping?. Brill. ISBN 9789004273221.
- Scott, Jamie (2012), The Religions of Canadians, University of Toronto Press, ISBN 9781442605169
- Tambiah, Stanley Jeyaraja (1984). The Buddhist Saints of the Forest and the Cult of Amulets. Cambridge University Press. ISBN 978-0-521-27787-7.
- Taylor, J. L. (1993). Forest Monks and the Nation-state: An Anthropological and Historical Study in Northeastern Thailand. Singapore: Institute of Southeast Asian Studies. ISBN 978-981-3016-49-1.
- Taylor, Jim [J.L.] (2008), Buddhism and Postmodern Imaginings in Thailand: The Religiosity of Urban Space, Ashgate, ISBN 9780754662471
- Tiyavanich, Kamala (January 1997). Forest Recollections: Wandering Monks in Twentieth-Century Thailand. University of Hawaii Press. ISBN 978-0-8248-1781-7.
- Zuidema, Jason (2015), Understanding the Consecrated Life in Canada: Critical Essays on Contemporary Trends, Wilfrid Laurier University Press
