= List of Buddhist temples in Australia =

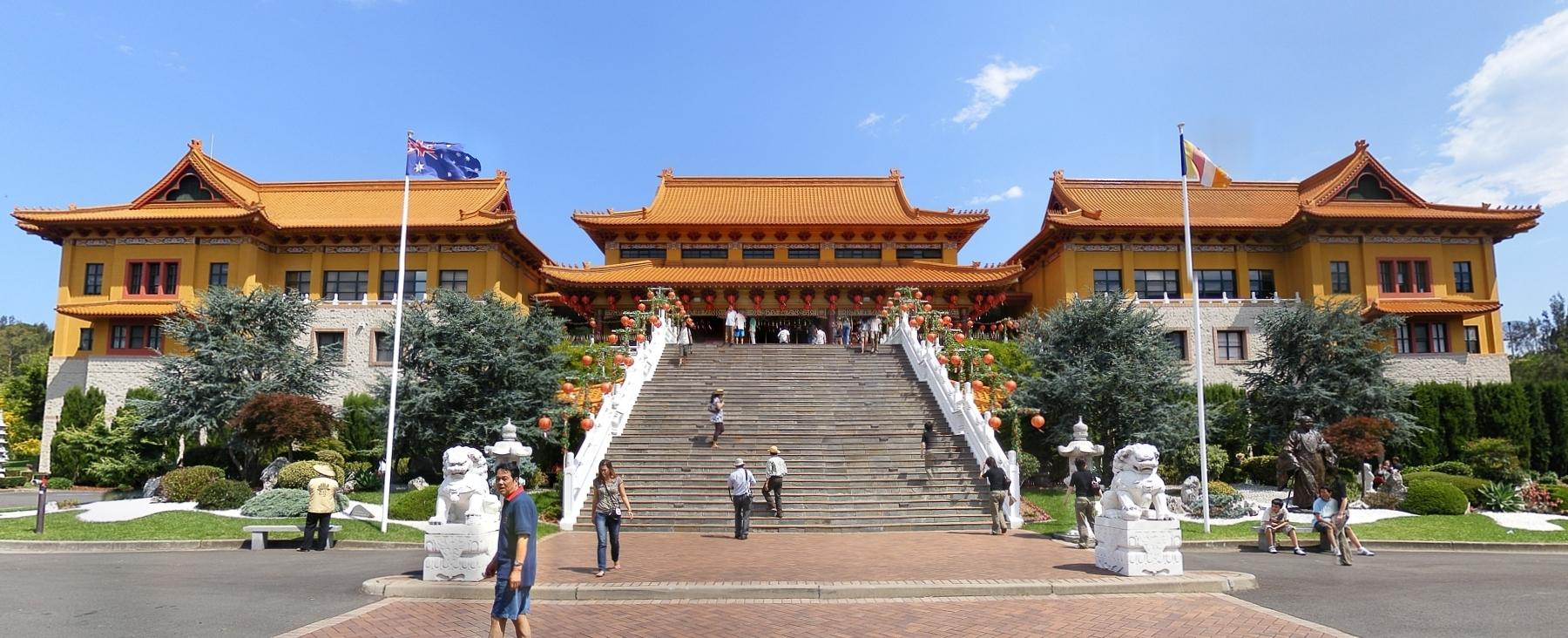
Nan Tien Temple

This is a list of Buddhist temples, monasteries, stupas, and pagodas in Australia for which there are Wikipedia articles, sorted by location.

== New South Wales ==
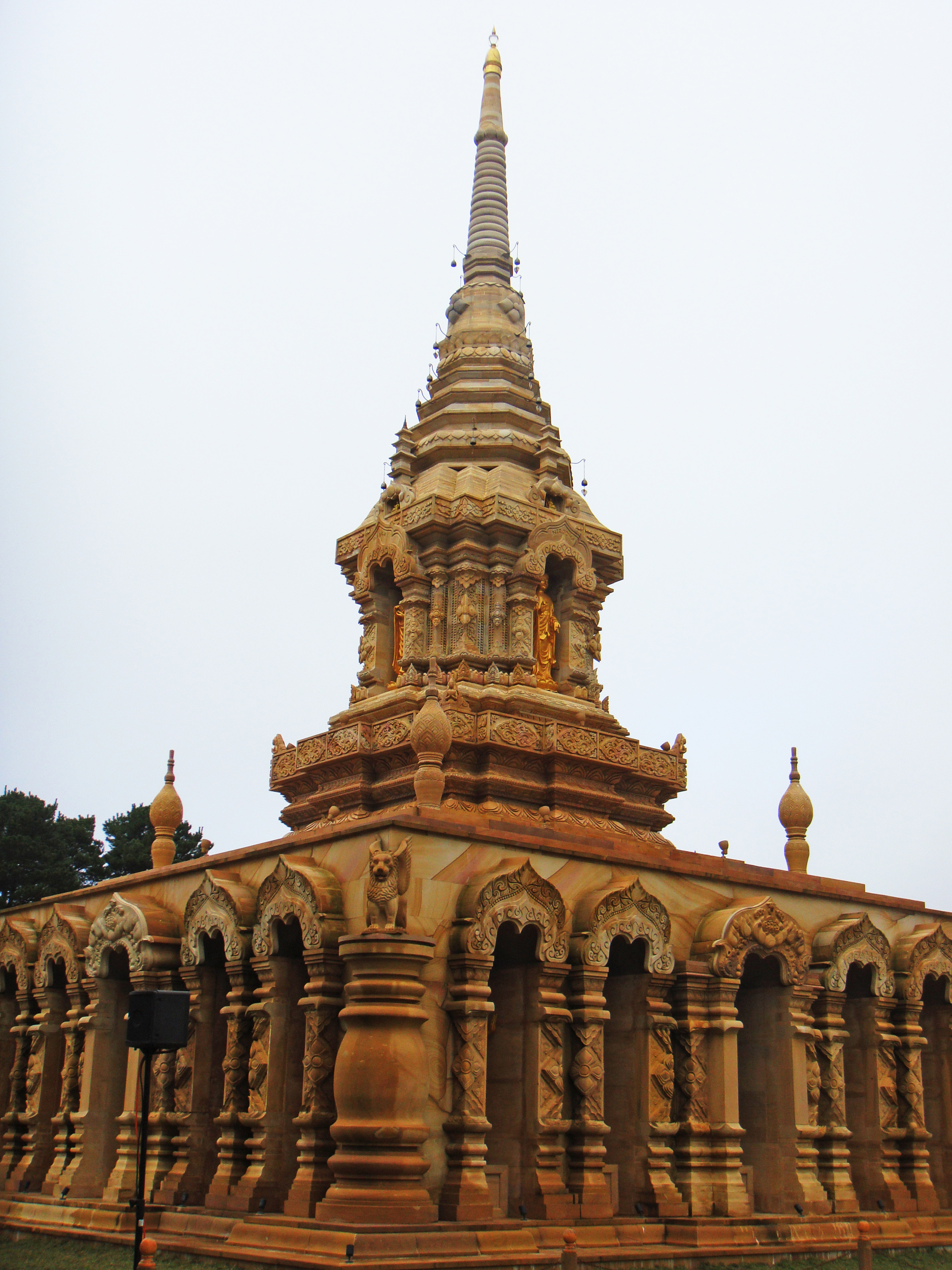
Sunnataram Forest Monastery

- Nan Tien Temple
- Sunnataram Forest Monastery

== Queensland ==
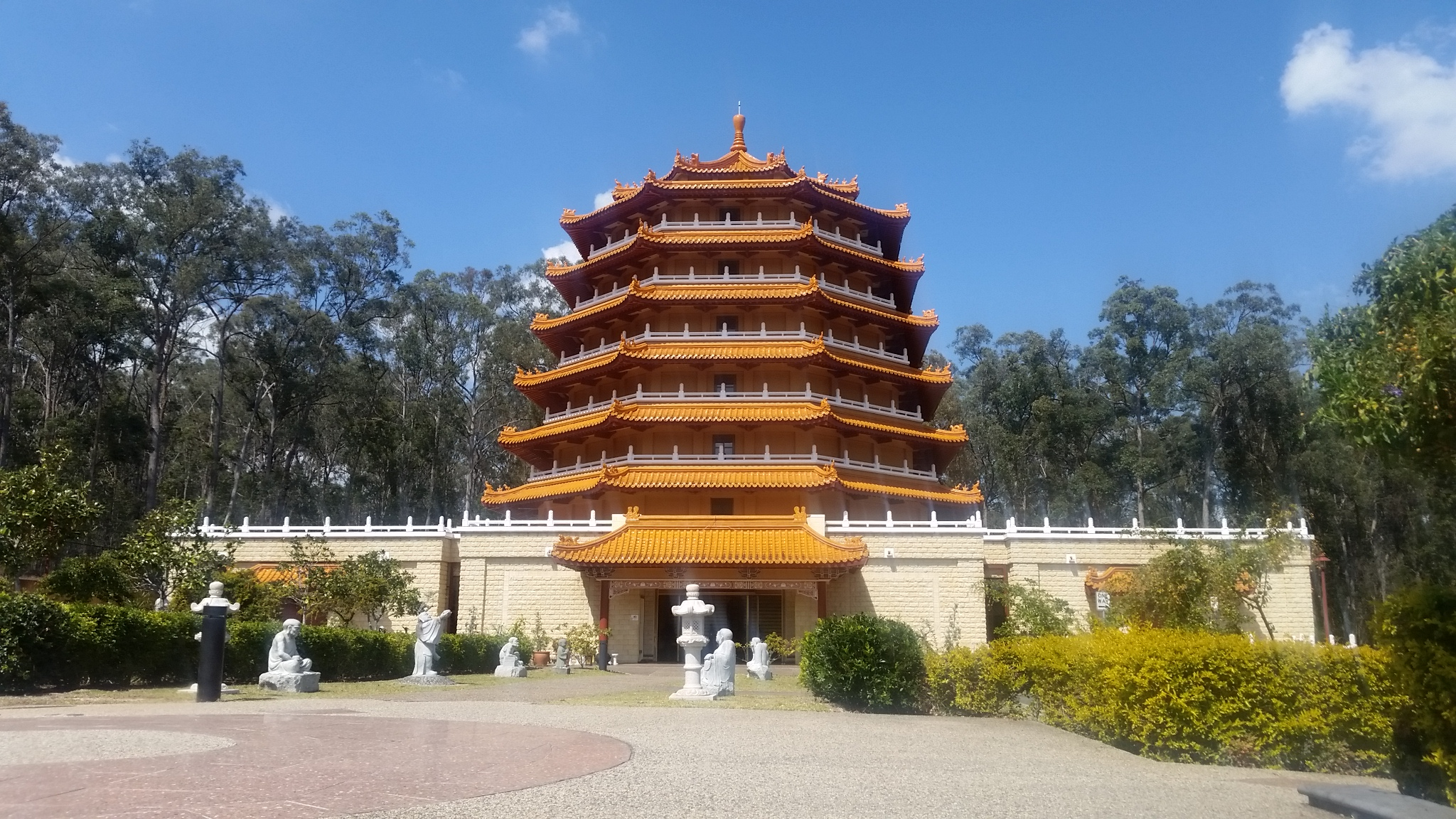
Chung Tian Temple

- Chung Tian Temple
- Nepalese Peace Pagoda
- Holy Triad Temple, Albion

== South Australia ==
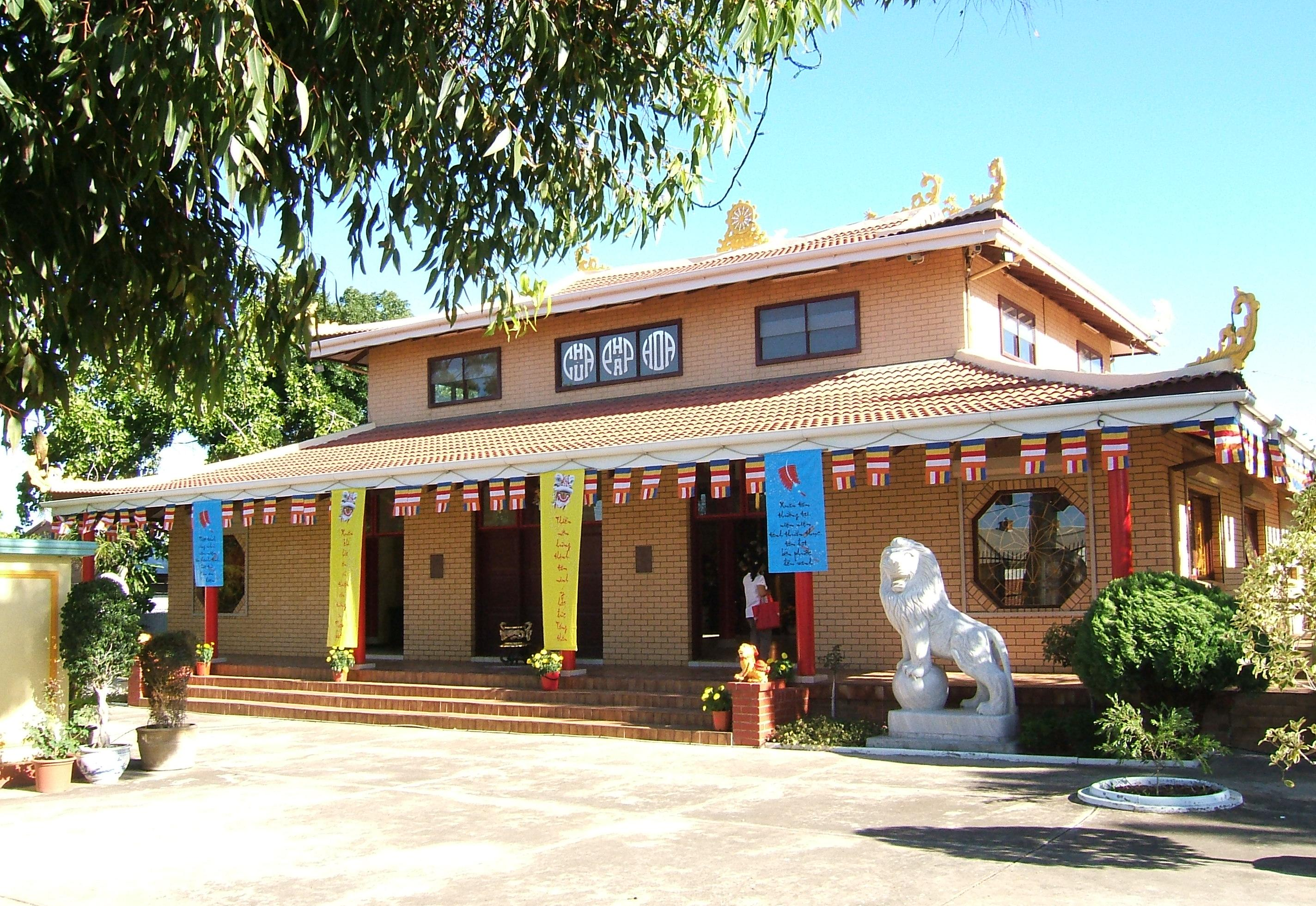
Pháp Hoa Temple

- Pháp Hoa Temple

== Victoria ==
- Great Stupa of Universal Compassion
- Tara Institute
- Thubten Shedrup Ling

== Western Australia ==
- Bodhinyana Monastery

== See also ==
- Buddhism in Australia
- Ajahn Brahmavamso
- Ajahn Sujato
- Ayya Nirodha
- Geshe Acharya Thubten Loden
- Geshe Sonam Thargye
- MITRA Youth Buddhist Network
- List of Buddhist temples
