= Buddhism in Australia =

Buddhists in Australia

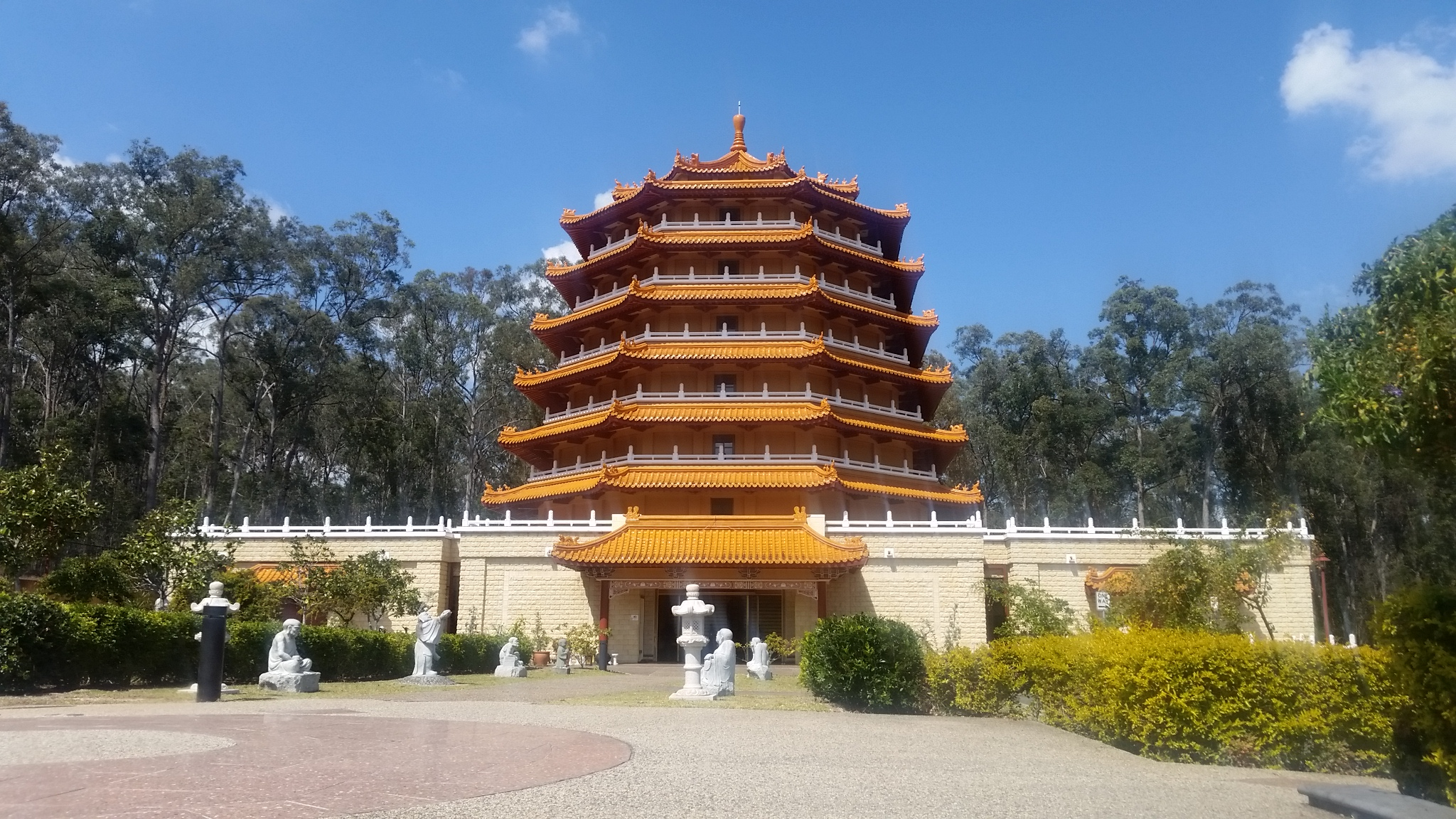
- Chung Tian Temple

Total population
- 610,000 (2021); 2.4% of the Australian population

Regions with significant populations
- Sydney; Canberra; Melbourne; Brisbane; Perth; Victoria; New South Wales; Christmas Island; Queensland

Languages
- English, many other languages of Asia

In Australia, Buddhism is a minority religion. According to the 2021 census, 2.4 percent of the total population or 610,000 of Australia identified as Buddhist. It was also the fastest-growing religion by percentage, having increased its number of adherents by 79 percent between the 1996 and 2001 censuses. The highest percentage of Buddhists in Australia is present in Christmas Island, where Buddhists constitute 18.1% of the total population according to the 2016 Census. Buddhism is the fourth largest religion in the country after Christianity, Islam and Hinduism.

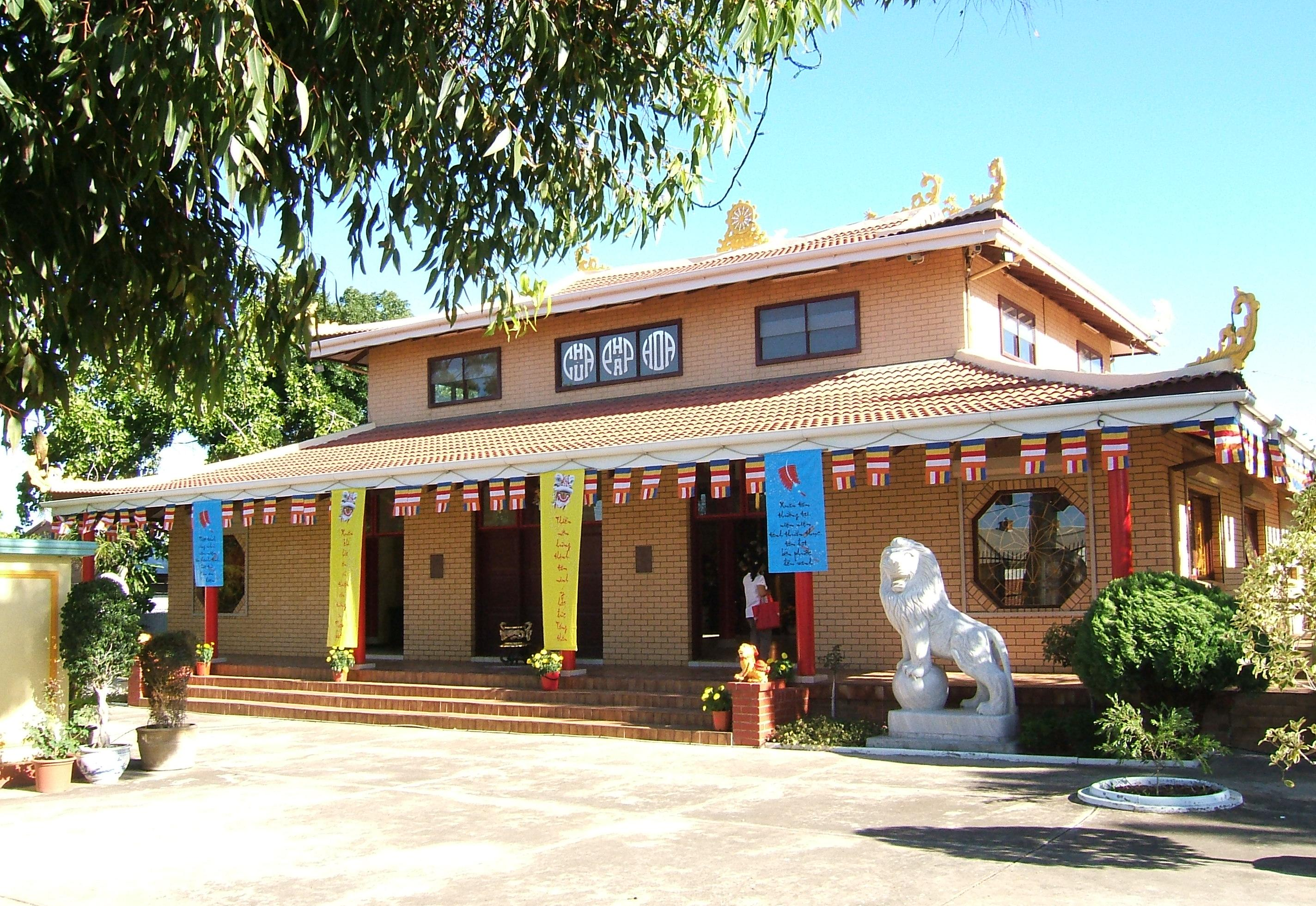
Phap Hoa Temple, a Vietnamese Buddhist temple in Adelaide.

== Demographics ==
The change in demography of Buddhism in Australia is given:

Year	Percent	Increase
1986	0.5%	–
1996	1.1%	▲0.6%
2006	2.1%	▲1.0%
2011	2.5%	▲0.4%
2016	2.4%	▼0.1%
2021	2.4%	0%

People who are affiliated with Buddhism as a percentage of the total population in Australia divided geographically by statistical local area, as of the 2011 census

People who are affiliated with Buddhism as a percentage of the total population in Sydney divided geographically by postal area, as of the 2011 census

2011 census data showed the Buddhist affiliated population had grown from 418,749 to 528,977 people, an increase of 20.8%. As Australia's population was estimated at 21.5 million at the time, according to the same census, the Buddhist population may be estimated at 2.46% of the population.

According to the 2016 census, the Buddhist population numbered 563,677 individuals, of whom 33% live in Greater Sydney, 30% in Greater Melbourne, and 8% each in Greater Brisbane and Greater Perth. The states and territories with the highest proportion of Buddhists are Victoria (3.07%) and New South Wales (2.78%), whereas those with the lowest are Queensland (1.51%) and Tasmania (0.79%).

The highest percentage of Buddhists are present in Christmas Island, where Buddhism constitutes 18.1% of the total population according to the 2016 Census. Buddhism was the largest religion in Christmas Island before 2013; Islam later become the dominant religion there when Malays become biggest ethnic group in the island.

== History ==
The first clear example of Buddhist settlement in Australia dates to 1858. However, there has been speculation from some anthropologists that there may have been contact hundreds of years earlier; in the book Aboriginal Men of High Degree, A.P. Elkin cites what he believes is evidence that traders from Indonesia may have brought fleeting contact with Buddhism and Hinduism to areas near modern-day Dampier. Elkin interpreted a link between Indigenous Australian culture and Buddhist ideas such as reincarnation. He argued this link could have been brought through contact with Macassan traders. There was also speculation due to reports of Chinese relics appearing in northern Australia dating to the 15th century, although it may have been brought much later through trade rather than earlier exploration.

In 1851, the first large group of Chinese to come to Australia came as part of the gold rush, most of them staying briefly for prospecting purposes rather than mass migration. In 1856, a temple was established in South Melbourne by the secular Sze Yap group. This temple was also used for Taoism, Confucianism, various cultural deities and even astrological activities. However, no clerics from China ever came to Australia. While numbers of worshipers at the See Yup temple in South Melbourne varied over time (primarily due to the White Australia Policy), it has been in continuous use as a temple ever since.

The first Buddhist group to arrive in Australia was a troupe of acrobats and jugglers from Japan who toured in 1867. More arrived throughout the century, mostly involved in the pearling industry in northern Australia, reaching an estimate of 3600 on Thursday Island, and also in Broome and Darwin, Northern Territory.

The first Sinhalese Buddhists from Sri Lanka arrived in 1870 to work in sugarcane plantations. A community was believed to exist on Thursday Island in 1876. In 1882, a group of 500 left Colombo for Queensland, mostly in Mackay. The oldest remaining structure attesting to the establishment of Buddhism in Australia are two Bodhi Trees planted on Thursday Island in the 1890s, although the temple which once stood there no longer exists.

During the 20th century, the number of Buddhists gradually declined due to emigration and a lack of immigration caused by the White Australia Policy.

In 1891, the American Buddhist, Colonel Henry Steel Olcott, who was the co-founder of Theosophical Society came to Australia and participated in a lecture series, which led to a greater awareness of Buddhism in small circles of mainly upper-class society. One of the members of the Theosophical Society was future Australian Prime Minister Alfred Deakin, who had spent three months in India and Sri Lanka in 1890 and wrote a book which discussed spiritual matters, including Buddhism.

The first instance of a monk arriving in Australia was in 1910, when U Sasana Dhaja, born E.H. Stevenson in Yarmouth, arrived from Burma. Over the years, various monks visited Australia, but it was not until the 1970s that a resident monk (named Venerable Somaloka) arrived from Sri Lanka.

The first specific Buddhist group, the Buddhist Study Group Melbourne, was formed in Melbourne in 1938 by Len Bullen, but it collapsed during the Second World War. The Buddhist Society of Victoria was formed in 1953, and in 1956 the Buddhist Society of New South Wales was formed. From the 1950s until the 1970s, the Buddhist Societies were lay organizations which self-discussed Buddhism.

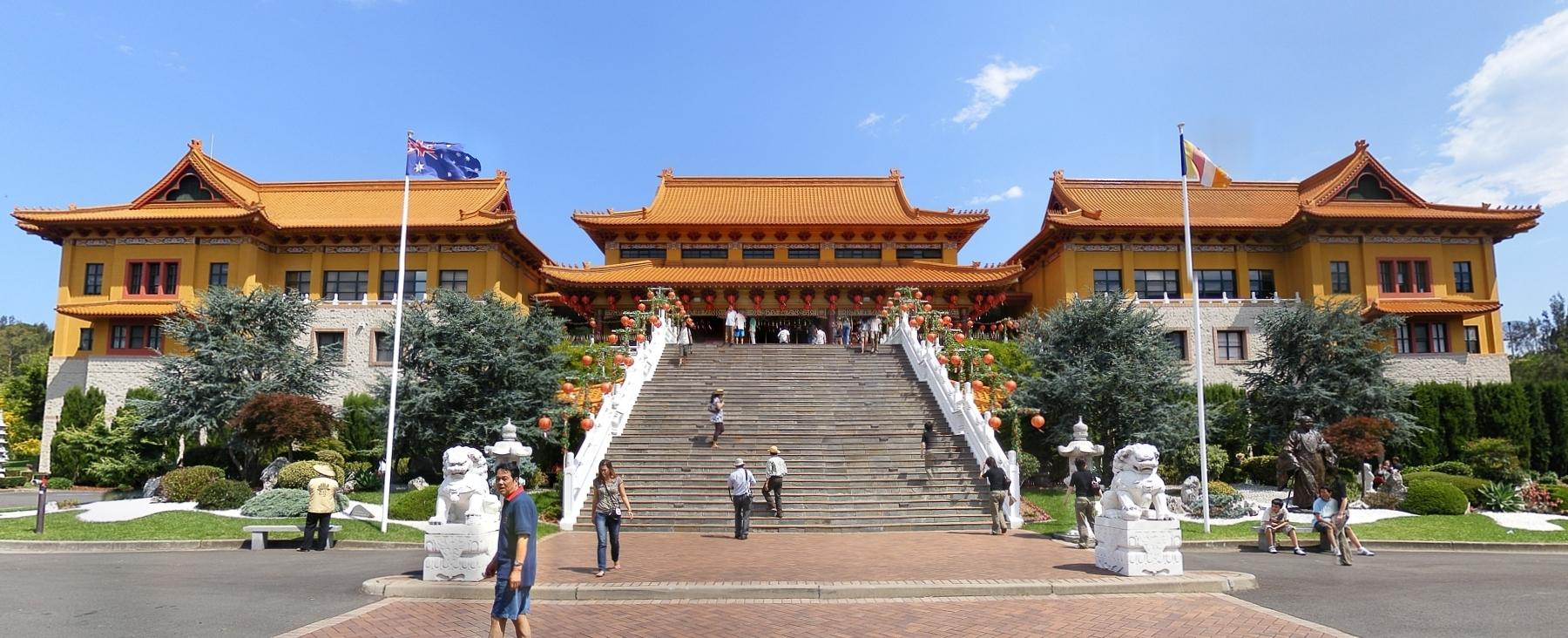
Nan Tien Temple of Fo Guang Shan Chinese Buddhism, in Wollongong.

In the late 1970s, Buddhism began to become more widespread, mainly due to immigration from South East Asia following the Vietnam War, as well as the spread to Western countries of Tibetan Buddhism, led by figures such as Lama Yeshe, who established religious institutions with resident monks, and Sogyal Rinpoche, during the 1980s, the founder of the Rigpa organization. This was supplemented by further immigration from Asia in the proceeding decades.

In 2009 in Australia four women received bhikkhuni ordination as Theravada nuns, the first time such ordination had occurred in Australia. It was performed in Perth, Australia, on 22 October 2009 at Bodhinyana Monastery. Abbess Vayama together with Venerables Nirodha, Seri, and Hasapanna were ordained as Bhikkhunis by a dual Sangha act of Bhikkhus and Bhikkhunis in full accordance with the Pali Vinaya.

Buddhism used to have the highest percentage growth of all religions in Australia, having had an increase of 79 percent in the number of adherents from the 1996 to the 2001 census. Since the 1986 census, the number of adherents has increased from 80,387 to around 370,345 in 2001. However, it started to decline from 2.5 percent in 2011 to 2.4 percent in 2016, although there is still an increase of about 34,700 Buddhists in the number of adherents.

== Buddhist temples ==
- Bodhinyana Monastery
- Dhammasara Monastery
- Pháp Hoa Temple
- Nan Tien Temple
- Newbury Buddhist Monastery
- Chung Tian Temple
- Stream Entering Monastery (Tu viện Nhập Lưu)
- Sunnataram Forest Monastery
- Tara Institute
- Chenrezig Institute

== See also ==
- Ajahn Brahmavamso
- Ajahn Sujato
- Ayya Nirodha
- Geshe Acharya Thubten Loden
- Geshe Sonam Thargye
- Buddhism in New Zealand
- Buddhism in Oceania
- Great Stupa of Universal Compassion
