= Buddhism in New Zealand =

Buddhism is New Zealand's fourth-largest religion after Christianity, Hinduism, and Islam standing at 1.1% of the population of New Zealand. Buddhism originates in Asia and was introduced to New Zealand by immigrants from East Asia.

== History ==
The first Buddhists in New Zealand were Chinese diggers in the Otago goldfields in the mid-1860s. Their numbers were small, and the 1926 census, the first to include Buddhism, recorded only 169. Buddhism grew significantly as a religion in New Zealand during the 1970s and 1980s with the arrival of Southeast Asian immigrants and refugees, coinciding with increased interest in Buddhist teaching from Western communities. Buddhist associations began forming, such as the Zen Society of New Zealand in 1972 (originally known as the Denkyo-ji Society), often fundraising to organise

In the 1970s travel to Asian countries and visits by Buddhist teachers sparked an interest in the religious traditions of Asia, and significant numbers of New Zealanders adopted Buddhist practices and teachings.

Since the 1980s Asian migrants and refugees have established their varied forms of Buddhism in New Zealand. In the 2010s more than 50 groups, mostly in the Auckland region, offered different Buddhist traditions at temples, centres, monasteries and retreat centres. Many migrant communities brought priests or religious specialists from their own countries and their temples and centres have acted as focal points for a particular ethnic community, offering language and religious instruction. National and international groups.

In 2008 the Sixth Global Conference on Buddhism brought leading teachers and scholars to Auckland under the auspices of the New Zealand Buddhist Foundation. The New Zealand Buddhist Council was established in 2007 and was composed of 15 Buddhist organisations. As of 2020 there are 32 member organizations. They engage with local and national government over issues of concern to Buddhist communities, support their members administratively and promote dialogue and understanding between the rich diversity of traditions in the country.

== Demographics ==
According to the 2006 Census, Buddhism constituted 1.4% of the population of New Zealand. It slightly increased to 1.5% in the 2013 census. Most of the Buddhists in New Zealand are migrants from Asia with significant New Zealanders converted to Buddhism ranging from 15,000-20,000. According to the 2013 census, there are about 58,440 Buddhists in New Zealand. The converts to Buddhism is estimated to constitute between 25%–35% of the total Buddhist population in New Zealand. The 2018 census counted 52,779 Buddhists in New Zealand.

Year	Percent	Increase
2006	1.40%	+0.20%
2013	1.50%	+0.10%
2018	1.13%	-0.37%

== Contemporary Society ==
According to a Survey done by Victoria University of Wellington in 2019, it was found that New Zealanders believe that Buddhists are the most trusted religious group in New Zealand. About 35 per cent of New Zealanders have complete or substantial trust in Buddhists.

== Buddhist temples ==
There are many Buddhist temples and centres in New Zealand for New Zealand Buddhists to practice their religion, the largest being Fo Guang Shan Buddhist Temple New Zealand in Auckland. Fo Guang Shan Buddhist Temple South Island in Christchurch's Riccarton Road opened in 2007; it was designed by Warren and Mahoney. Closed after the 2011 Christchurch earthquake, the temple reopened in August 2016.

The Bodhinyanarama Monastery in Stokes Valley, Lower Hutt was established in the 1980s, with the monastery complex constructed in 1992. Vimutti Buddhist Monastery was established near Bombay and Ararimu in rural southern Auckland Region in early 2000. Both monasteries belong to the Forest Tradition of Ajahn Chah.

Wat Lao Buddharam in Ōtāhuhu, Auckland, was constructed by Laotian refugees in 1989, and Ratanadipa Buddhist Temple, a Burmese community temple, was established in 2002 by the Auckland Myanmar Buddhist Association. As of 2021, there are nine Thai Buddhist temples across the country.

== Gallery ==
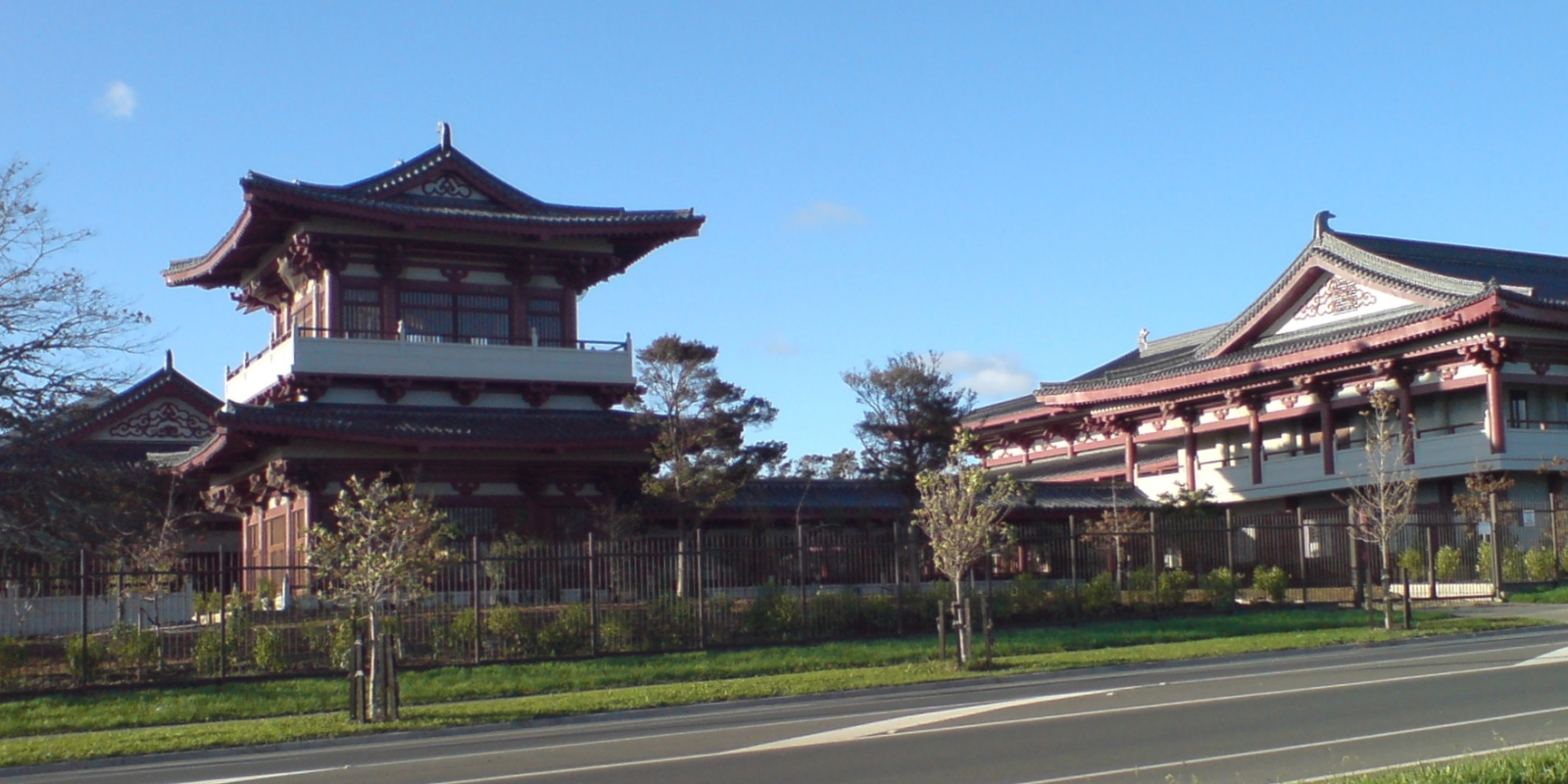
Fo Guang Shan Temple, Auckland

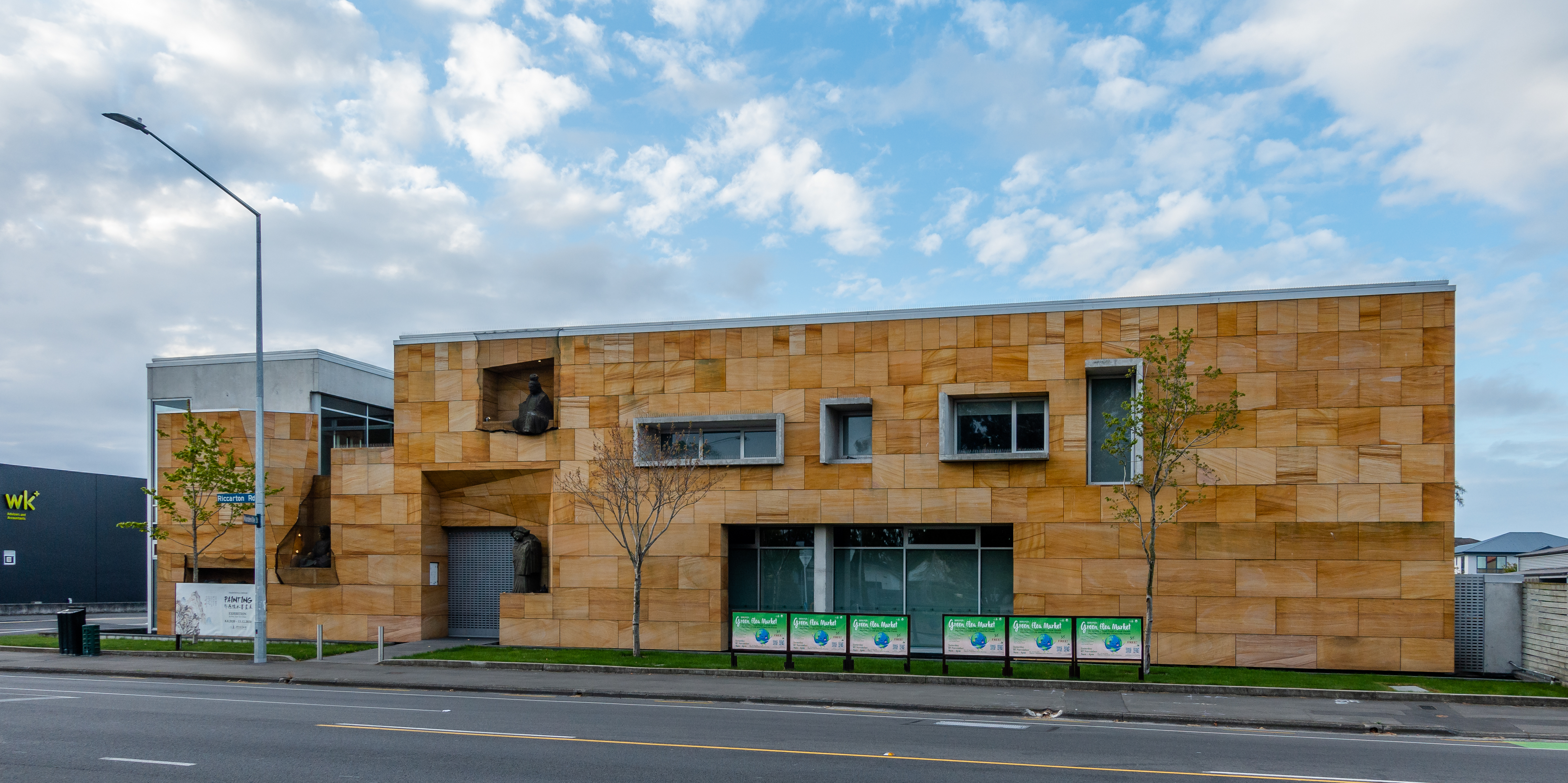
Fo Guang Shan Buddhist Temple South Island in Riccarton, Christchurch

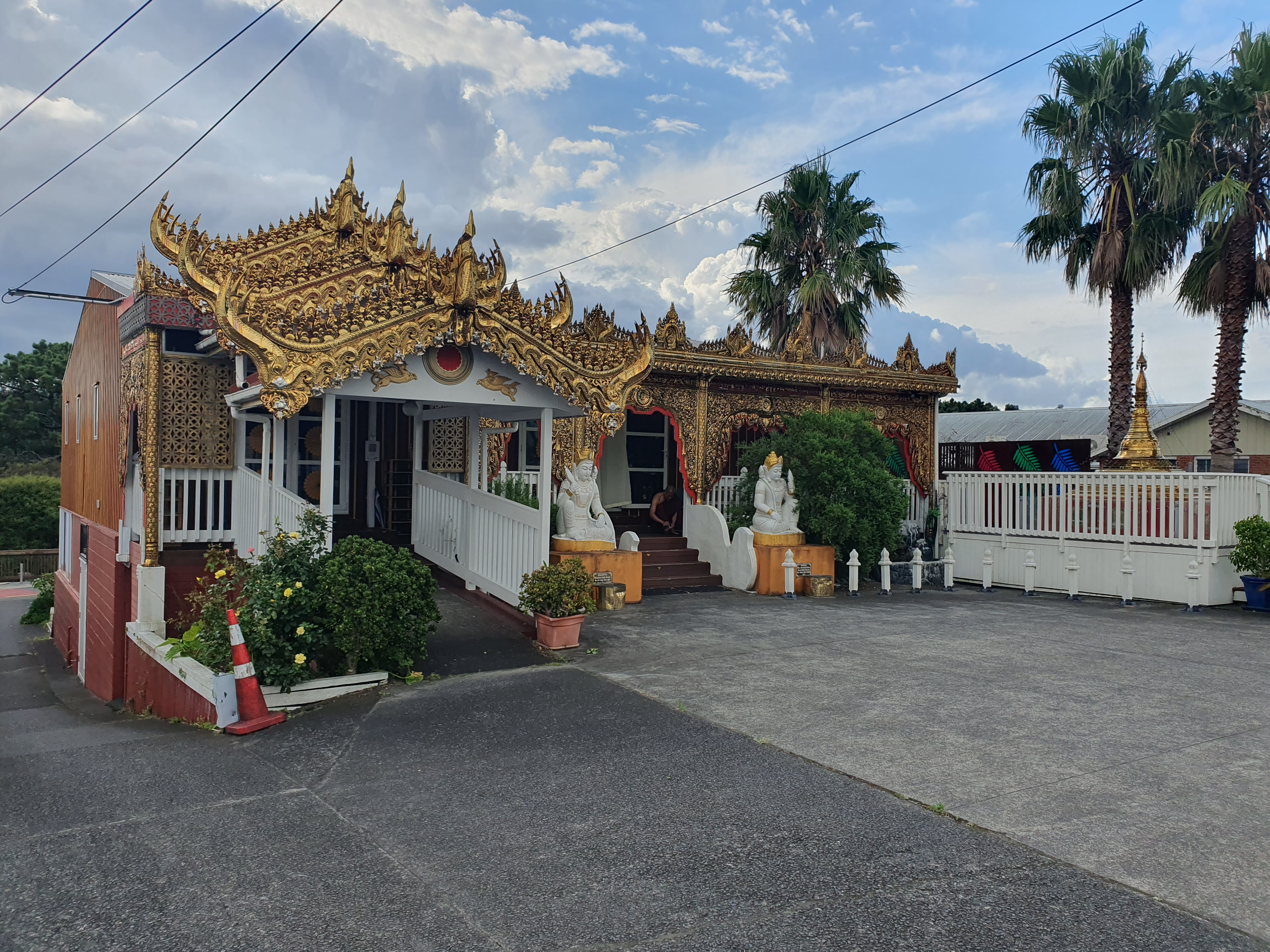
Ratanadipa Buddhist Temple, a Burmese Buddhist temple in New Lynn, Auckland

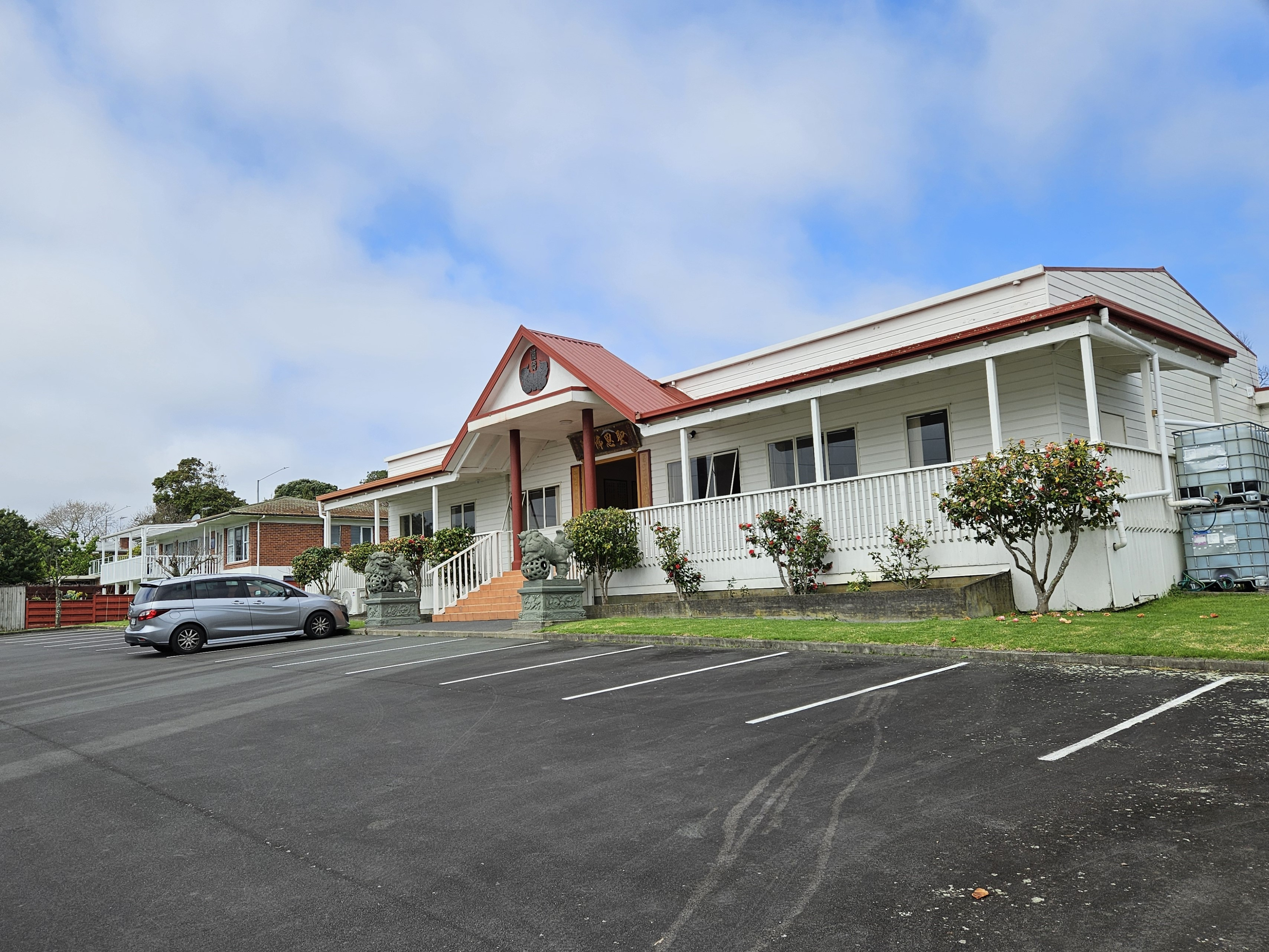
Saint Ann Buddhist Temple in Mount Wellington, Auckland

== See also ==
- Thai Forest Tradition
- Fo Guang Shan
- Buddhism in Australia
- Buddhism in Oceania
- Buddhism in Southeast Asia
- Index of Buddhism-related articles
