= Pháp Hoa Temple =

Buddhist temple in Pennington, South Australia

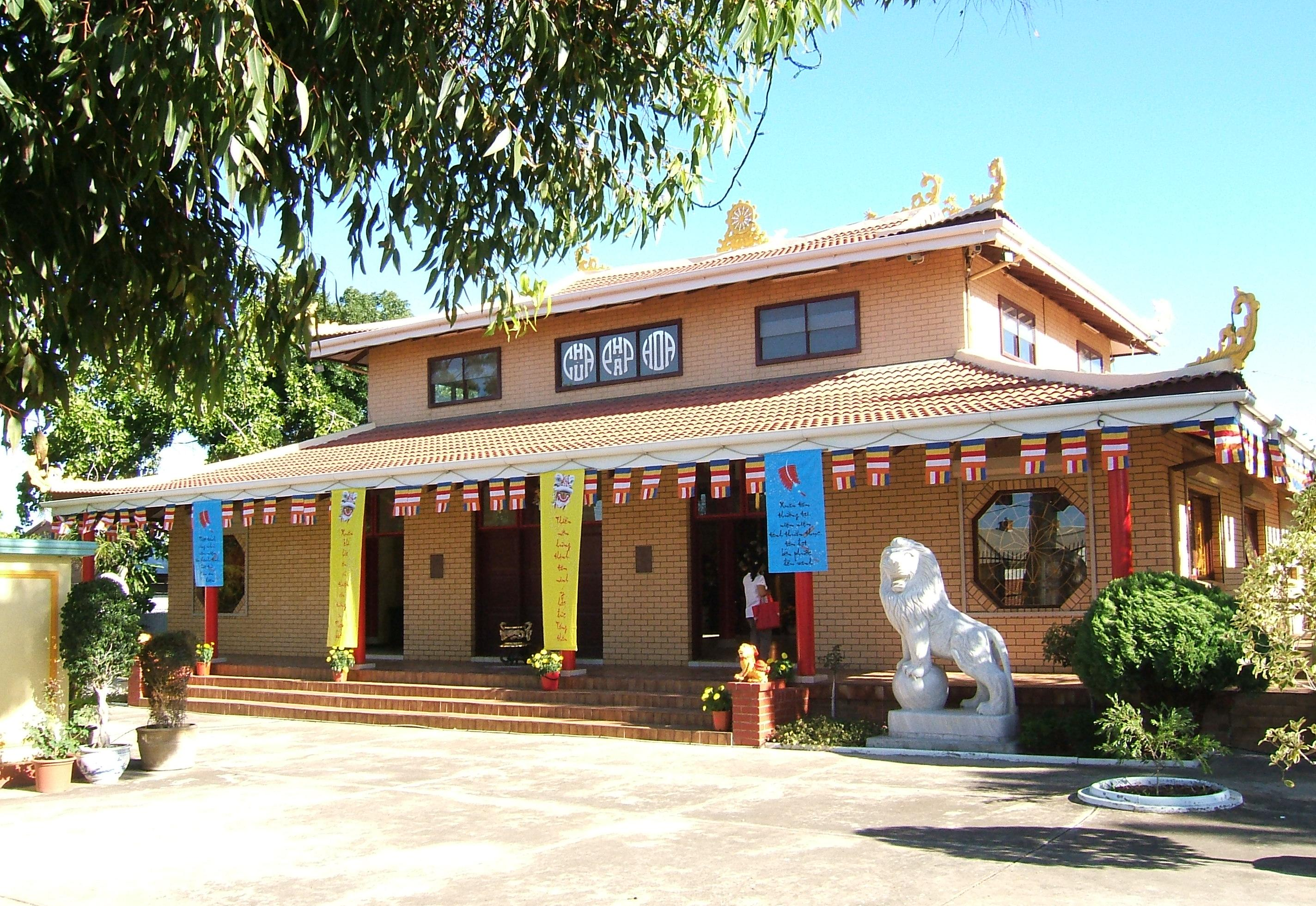
- Phap Hoa Temple

- Location within Australia

Religion
- Affiliation: Buddhist
- Sect: United Vietnamese Buddhist Congregation

Location
- Location: 20 Butler Avenue, Pennington, South Australia, 5013
- Country: Australia
- Interactive map of Pháp Hoa Temple
- Coordinates: 34°51′26″S 138°32′00″E

Architecture
- Completed: 1978

Phap Hoa Temple (Vietnamese: Chùa Pháp Hoa,, Chữ Hán: 法葩寺), meaning Dharma Lotus Temple, is a Buddhist temple located in Pennington, South Australia. Established in 1978, it moved to its current location in December 1989. It is a member of the United Vietnamese Buddhist Congregation and the head is the Most Venerable Thich Nhu Hue, and the abbot is the Reverend Thich Vien Tri.

== History ==
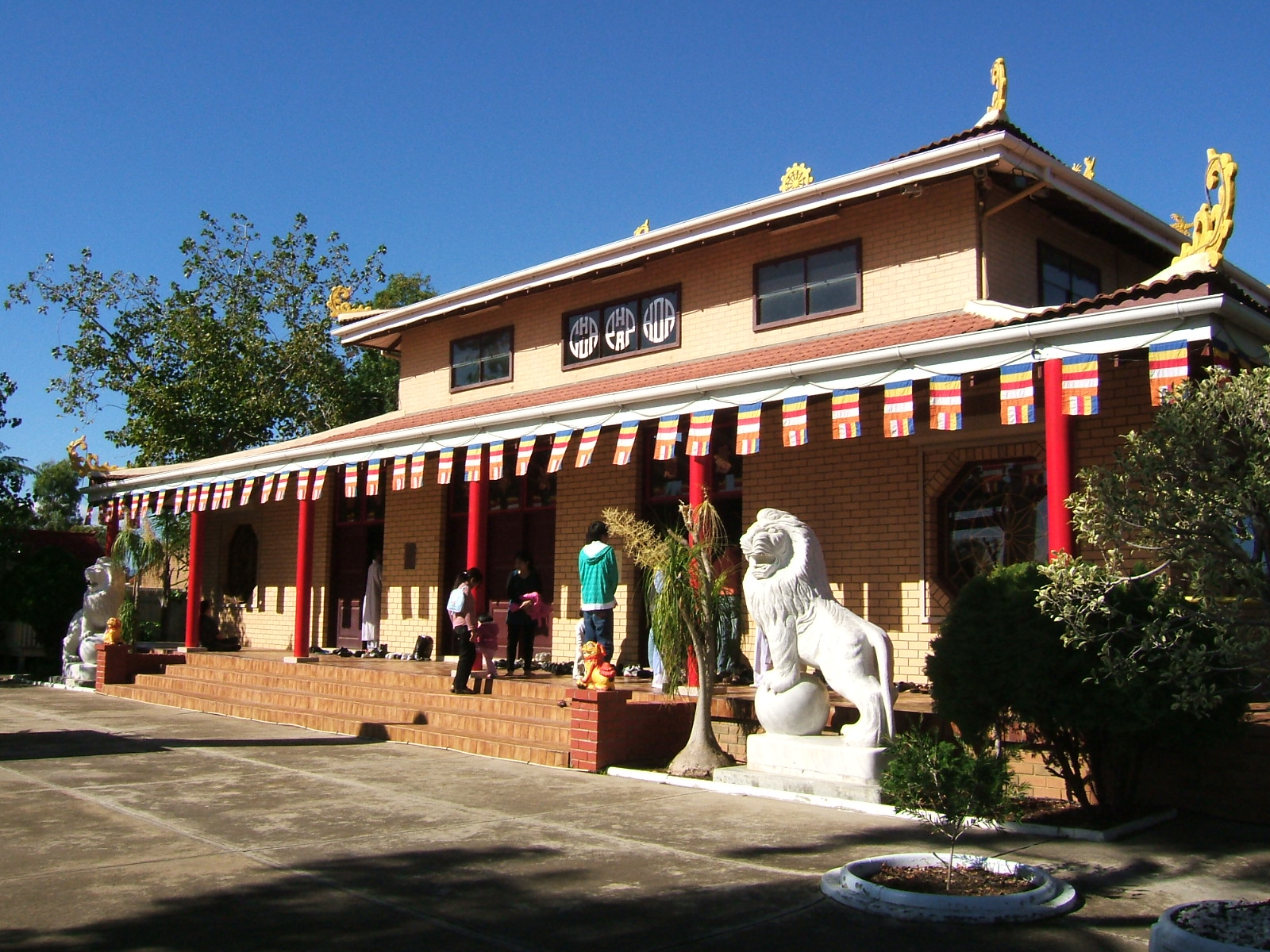
Pháp Hoa Temple in the afternoon

Pháp Hoa Temple was established in 1978 at a small house located at 83 Addison Road, Rosewater, South Australia by a group of Vietnamese immigrants, led by Nguyen Van Tuoi for the purpose of attending to the spiritual needs of immigrant Vietnamese Buddhists. The Most Venerable Thich Nhu Hue was invited to come from Japan to direct the temple. Due to the small size, a search for a plot of larger land to construct a temple was undertaken, and building of the temple in its current location began on a 5000 m^{2} plot on 19 March 1984. The main hall of the temple was opened on 23 December 1989.

On 26 June 2003 the main hall suffered extensive damage, when an intruder irreparably vandalized the majority of the statues and decorations. This required the replacement of a large number of statues. Along with a new statue of Avalokitesvara Bodhisattva located in the courtyard of the Temple, and a Three Entrance Fence, the refurbished hall was unveiled in a ceremony on 27 June 2004 in the presence of South Australian Premier Mike Rann and the Opposition leader Rob Kerin.

== See also ==
- Buddhism in Australia
- Bodhinyana Monastery
- Chung Tian Temple
- Nan Tien Temple
- Sunnataram Forest Monastery
- List of Buddhist temples in Hanoi
