= MITRA Youth Buddhist Network =

The MITRA Youth Buddhist Network (formerly the MITRA Intervarsity Buddhist Network) is a network of Buddhist youth organisations in Australia. Predominantly situated in Sydney, Australia, MITRA's current members are UniBodhi (Sydney University Buddhist Society), MacBuddhi (Macquarie University Buddhist Society), and UTS (University of Technology, Sydney) Buddhist Society.

The name of the network MITRA, stems from a Sanskrit word meaning "friend".

Since 2004, MITRA has held Buddhist annual conferences which brings together a range of international and local speakers and topics.

== MITRA Buddhist Conferences ==
The MITRA Youth Buddhist Network has, since 2004, organised an annual Buddhist conference. Traditionally held in July, except for 2010 which was held in May to coincide with the Buddhist Festival Month celebrations run by the Buddhist Council of New South Wales.

The MITRA Buddhist Conference is convened by a member, or members, of MITRA inviting local and international learned speakers to give talks and lead discussions at the Conference. Run and managed entirely by volunteers, the MITRA Buddhist Conference relies on the goodwill of the community in keeping the Conference sustainable. Between 2004 and 2009, the food for the Conference was donated by the community including the Friends of Mitra, a conglomerate of elder lay Buddhists, and local Sydney vegetarian restaurants.

=== 2010 Buddhism: Unplugged ===
The "Buddhism: Unplugged" 2010 MITRA Buddhist Conference was held at the Sydney Masonic Centre. The theme explored the world of different Buddhist practices and "back to basic" principles which all Buddhist schools of thought accept and promote.

This year the MITRA Youth Buddhist Network collaborated with the Buddhist Council of New South Wales to be a partner of the inaugural Buddhist Festival Month celebrations.

=== 2009 Having Enough ... Finding Spiritual Wealth ===
The "Having enough ... Finding spiritual wealth" 2009 MITRA Buddhist Conference was held at the University of Technology, Sydney. The theme explored happiness in the midst of the financial hardships of the Global Financial Crisis.

=== 2008 Wisdom For A Modern World ===
The "Wisdom for a Modern World" 2008 MITRA Buddhist Conference was held at the University of Technology, Sydney. The theme explored how the wisdom of Buddhism can be experienced in all aspects of our lives even in our chaotic modern world we can find a peace and tranquility awaiting those who seek it.

A DVD of the Conference is available which includes footage of all 6 talks including Venerable Robina Courtin's explanation of transforming the mind, Venerable David Lungtok on Emptiness, Venenerable U Vamsarakkhita on "The Buddha's Teaching - Simple, Practical and Powerful" and Venerable Shravasti Dhammika on "2500 Years of Evolving Truth". Profits from DVD sales will be donated to Venerable Sister Yeshe Chodron's Kalyanamitra Foundation which delivers social services to the poor regions of India.

=== 2007 Change Your Mind, Change The World ===
The "Change your mind, Change the world" 2007 MITRA Buddhist Conference was held at the Sydney Conservatorium of Music. Talks included Venerable Heng Sure's insight on whether "Buddhist Activism" is an oxymoron, Venerable Yuan Zhi's on "Love" - is it all you need? Venerable Christine Roberts on "Changing your mind" a discussion between AACAP's Dr Eng Kong Tan and Venerable Ayya Sucinta about the "Therapist's couch and the meditation cushion".

=== 2006 Stop Chasing ... Look Within ===
The "Stop Chasing...Look Within Mitra" 2006 MITRA Buddhist Conference was held at the Women's College at Sydney University. Talks included Ajahn Brahm's entertaining discussion on whether the West needs Buddhism, Venerable Thich Phuoc Tan on how to be a "Socially Engaged Buddhist" and Venerable Thubten Dondrup's moving talk on how to deal with suffering.

=== 2005 Illuminate The Path ===
The "Illuminate the path" 2005 MITRA Buddhist Conference was held at St George Girls High School.

=== 2004 Open Mind Open Heart ===
The "Open Mind Open Heart" 2004 MITRA Buddhist Conference was held at the Patrician Brothers Holy Cross College.
