= Ayya Nirodha =

Australian Buddhist nun

Bhikkhuni Ayya Nirodha

Personal life
- Born: Elizabeth Gorski; 1945 (age 80–81) Austria
- Known for: First Bhikkhuni in Australia

Religious life
- Religion: Buddhism
- Ordination: 2003

Ayya Nirodha is an Australian Buddhist nun. Her story was featured in the Buddhist Life Stories of Australia Project (2014–2015).

== Early life ==
Ayya Nirodha was born Elizabeth Gorski, in Austria in 1945.

== Later life ==
Nirodha emigrated to Australia, aged 20 years, with her husband. They divorced a few years later. Nirodha lived in Darling Point, and lived 'a privileged life of a Sydney socialite, travelling often to Europe'.

At a health retreat in the Blue Mountains she began to question her lifestyle and look for something deeper.

A neighbour introduced her to an Indian Vipassanā guru, Anagarika Munindra-Ji. During the gathering the guru announced that there was an upcoming retreat at Wat Buddha Dhamma, which Nirodha subsequently attended.

Nirodha notes that her study of Buddhism allowed her to understand her Christian roots better.

Nirodha was connected to the Insight Meditation Society in the Blue Mountains, and spent time in Buddhist centres in the USA and Burma.

In 1986, she purchased a property in Bundanoon, NSW, and named it the Citta Bhavana Hermitage. When her partner died, she decided to become a nun and donated the property to a committee with Ajahn Brahm as Spiritual Director; in 2003 it was renamed as Santi Forest Monastery.

Sunnataram Forest Monastery was set up on property donated by Nirodha to enable the establishment of a Thai forest monastery in Australia.

In 2001, Nirodha moved to Dhammasara Monastery, Gidgegannup, Western Australia.

In 2001, Nirodha took part in an Anagārika ceremony, which included undertaking Eight Precepts, shaving her head and putting on white robes.

In 2003, she was ordained as a Ten Precept nun. This included changing to brown robes, and relinquishing all money and assets. Nirodha reports that both her family and the bank were shocked at her intention to give away all her belongings because of her substantial assets. She was the first Sāmaṇerī, Ten Precept Nun of the Thai Forest Tradition to be ordained in Australia.

== Ordination controversy ==
In 2009, Nirodha and three other nuns from the Dhammasara community requested to become Bhikkhunis. The ordination ceremony was performed on 22 October 2009 at Bodhinyana Monastery, Serpentine.

The ordination of Nirodha and other bhikkhunis was opposed by leading English and Thai monks of the Wat Pa Pong order, of which Bodhinyana was a branch. As the most prominent member of the ordination quorum, Ajahn Brahm was excommunicated with his community from the Wat Pah Pong order for his role in the process.

This response has been described as 'swift and draconian', and indicative of sexism which was not part of Buddha's original vision. Buddha founded the bhikkhuni order by ordaining his maternal aunt and also his stepmother, Mahapajapati Gotami. The 'bhikkhuni ordination issue' is reported as being number 3 in the Top 10 international Buddhist news stories of 2009.

In 2012, Nirodha became the Abbess of Santi Forest Monastery at Bundanoon, New South Wales, on the departure of Bhante Sujato.

== Retirement ==
In 2017, Nirodha retired and moved into retreat.
