= Buddhism in Oceania =

Buddhism is a minority religion in Oceania.

== Buddhist population by countries or territories ==
Country or territories	Percentage of Buddhists
Northern Mariana Island	10.6%
Vanuatu	4%
Nauru	4%
Australia	2.4%
New Zealand	1.5%
Guam	1.1%
Palau	0.8%
Federated States of Micronesia	0.7%
Tonga	0.4%
American Samoa	0.5%
Kiribati	0.3%

== Buddhism in Australia ==
In Australia, Buddhism is a small but growing religion. According to the 2016 census, 2.4 percent of the total population of Australia, identified as Buddhist. It was also the fastest-growing religion by percentage, having increased its number of adherents by 79 percent between the 1996 and 2001 censuses. Buddhism is the third largest religion in the country after Christianity and Islam.

== Buddhism in New Zealand ==
Buddhism is New Zealand's third largest religion after Christianity and Hinduism, standing at 1.5% of the population of New Zealand. Buddhism originates in Asia and was introduced to New Zealand by immigrants from East Asia.

== Buddhism in Northern Mariana Island ==
According to the Pew Research Center, 2010, Buddhists constitute 10.6% of the population of Northern Mariana Island. The Japanese occupation had the effect of creating a sizable Buddhist community which remained even after their departure.

== Buddhism in Tonga ==
Buddhism has begun to gain traction, growing from 0.2% to 0.4% of the population in five years.

== Buddhism in American Samoa ==
World Christian Database 2010 estimate shows 0.3% Buddhist of the population of American Samoa are Buddhists.

== Buddhism in Vanuatu ==
Buddhism is practiced by 4% of the population of Vanuatu.

== Buddhism in Guam ==
According to the Pew Research Center, Buddhism is practiced by 1.1% of the population of Guam as of 2010.

== Buddhism in Palau ==
About 0.8% of the population was estimated to be Buddhist in 2010. After the arrival of Jesuit priests in the early 19th century, foreign missionaries have been active. During the Japanese mandate, Japanese Christian missions were heavily subsidized; Japan's native Buddhists were given a comparative pittance. Japanese rule brought Mahayana Buddhism and Shinto to Palau, with the syncretism of the two being the majority religion among Japanese settlers. However, following Japan's World War II defeat, the remaining Japanese largely converted to Christianity, while the remainder continued to practise Buddhism, but stopped practicing Shinto rites. The Seventh-day Adventist and Evangelical churches have missionaries teaching in their respective elementary and high schools.

== Buddhism in the Federated States of Micronesia ==
Buddhism is practised by 0.7% of the people in the Federated States of Micronesia They are mainly concentrated on Pohnpei island.

== See also ==
- Buddhism by country
- List of Buddhist temples in Australia
