= Fo Guang Shan Temple, Auckland =

Buddhist temple in Auckland, New Zealand

Fo Guang Shan Buddhist Temple of New Zealand
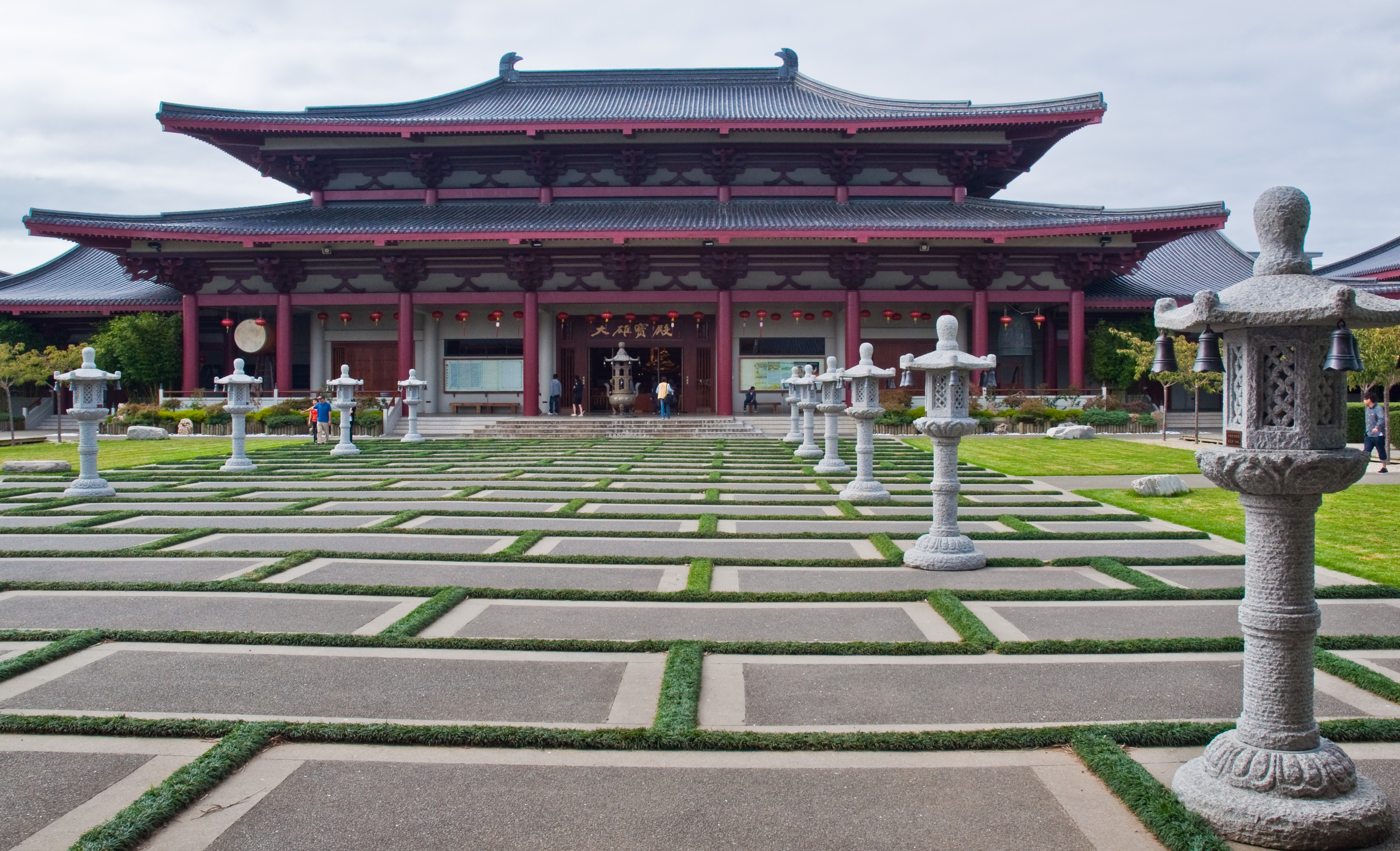
- Fo Guang Shan Buddhist Temple of New Zealand (2010).

- Location of the temple in Auckland

Religion
- Affiliation: Buddhist
- Sect: Humanistic Buddhism
- Ecclesiastical or organisational status: Temple
- Status: Active

Location
- Location: Manukau, Auckland, North Island
- Country: New Zealand
- Administration: Fo Guang Shan
- Coordinates: 36°57′26″S 174°54′40″E

Architecture
- Completed: 2007

Website
- fgs.org.nz/english/

The Fo Guang Shan Buddhist Temple of New Zealand is a temple and community centre of the Fo Guang Shan Chinese Buddhist movement in the East Tāmaki/Flat Bush suburb of Auckland, New Zealand. The temple and complex were built over seven years. It was designed in the architectural style of the Tang dynasty. The temple also includes a large Buddha statue and a two-tonne bell.

Opened in late 2007, the mission of the new temple is to promote Humanistic Buddhism. But it is also intended open to non-Buddhists, "through education and teaching people how to lead good lives." The temple had provided community courses such as Chinese School, Children Dharma Class, Meditation Class, as well as providing a venue for talks and meetings.

In Early Jan 2024 onward every Saturday 1030am temple having the English Dharma Services.

== Facilities ==
The temple grounds are open six days a week (closed Monday) and are open on most public holidays. Hours are normally 9 am until 3 pm but some parts of the temple (notably the exhibition hall and the external shrine) open later at 10am and close earlier 2.30pm. During festivals, the temple may be open later in the evening and occasionally will be open past midnight such as on the Lunar New Year.

=== Main Buddha hall ===
The main Buddha hall contains a single large Chinese-style statue of the Buddha Gautama in Calling the Earth to Witness pose. On the walls are thousands of bas-relief Buddha images.

=== Exhibition hall/Art gallery ===
Adjacent to the Buddha Hall is an exhibition hall. Exhibits are often, though not always, works of art about Buddhism, such as paintings, calligraphy and woven art. Several exhibits are shown throughout the year with each exhibit lasting for a few months but sometimes there are special exhibitions of a shorter duration. Occasionally, there will be activities for children, such as calligraphy writing during a calligraphy exhibition. Artworks can be viewed on the temples website.

Exhibitions by local artists are also held, such as the late 2019 - early 2020 exhibition by Dean Buchanan inspired by bicycling through the Waitākere Ranges.

The exhibition hall is open slightly shorter hours than the rest of the temple grounds. (As of 2022, the hall is open from 10 am to 2 pm, while the rest of temple is open from 9 am to 3 pm.) Entry is free.

=== Chinese School ===
The Fo Guang Shan Temple has had a Chinese school for 13 years. There are 20 classes, hosting in total roughly 300 students. The school teaches traditional Chinese, simplified Chinese, Pre-school Chinese, adult Chinese, mathematics, finger arithmetic and drawing.

=== Other areas ===
The entrance hall contains a statue of Avalokitesvara. A desk to the left is staffed by a volunteer member of Buddha's Light International Association (BLIA) and/or a resident nun to assist visitors and worshippers.

Outside and to the left of the main temple structure and below ground is a shrine to Ksitigarbha. This shrine shuts earlier than the rest of the temple.

The central area of the courtyard is divided into large flagstones separated by a grid of several inch high plants which lends itself to a slow walking meditation practice. (There is clear space to either side as well as level pathways for those with mobility concerns.)

To one side of the central courtyard is a series of short raised wood paths amongst cherry and other trees that lends itself to fast-walking meditation practice.

Other rooms off the central courtyard are often used for various services and activities such as language and calligraphy, sutra-chanting, and study groups.

A substantial area of the property is given over to car-parking. During larger festivals (notably Chinese New Year) portions of the front grounds will be covered with various food and activity stalls.

=== Water Drop Teahouse ===
On site is a tea house providing vegetarian food and a variety of teas and coffees. The teahouse is open from Tuesday to Sunday between 9:30 AM and 3 PM. The teahouse was created to serve Master Hsing Yun's asserted goal of spreading gratuity and encouraging kindness.

=== Gift shop ===
Sharing the same room as the tea house is a small gift shop providing a number of works of literature about Buddhism, particularly the writings of Hsing Yun (Fo Guang Shan's founder), a variety of religious objects (such as statues, mala, icons) and similar.

== See also ==
- IBPS Manila
- Zu Lai Temple
- Nan Hua Temple
- Hsi Lai Temple
- Chung Tian Temple
- Fo Guang Shan Buddha Museum
