= See Yup temple =

Chinese temple in Melbourne, Australia

See Yup Temple
- 四邑關帝廟
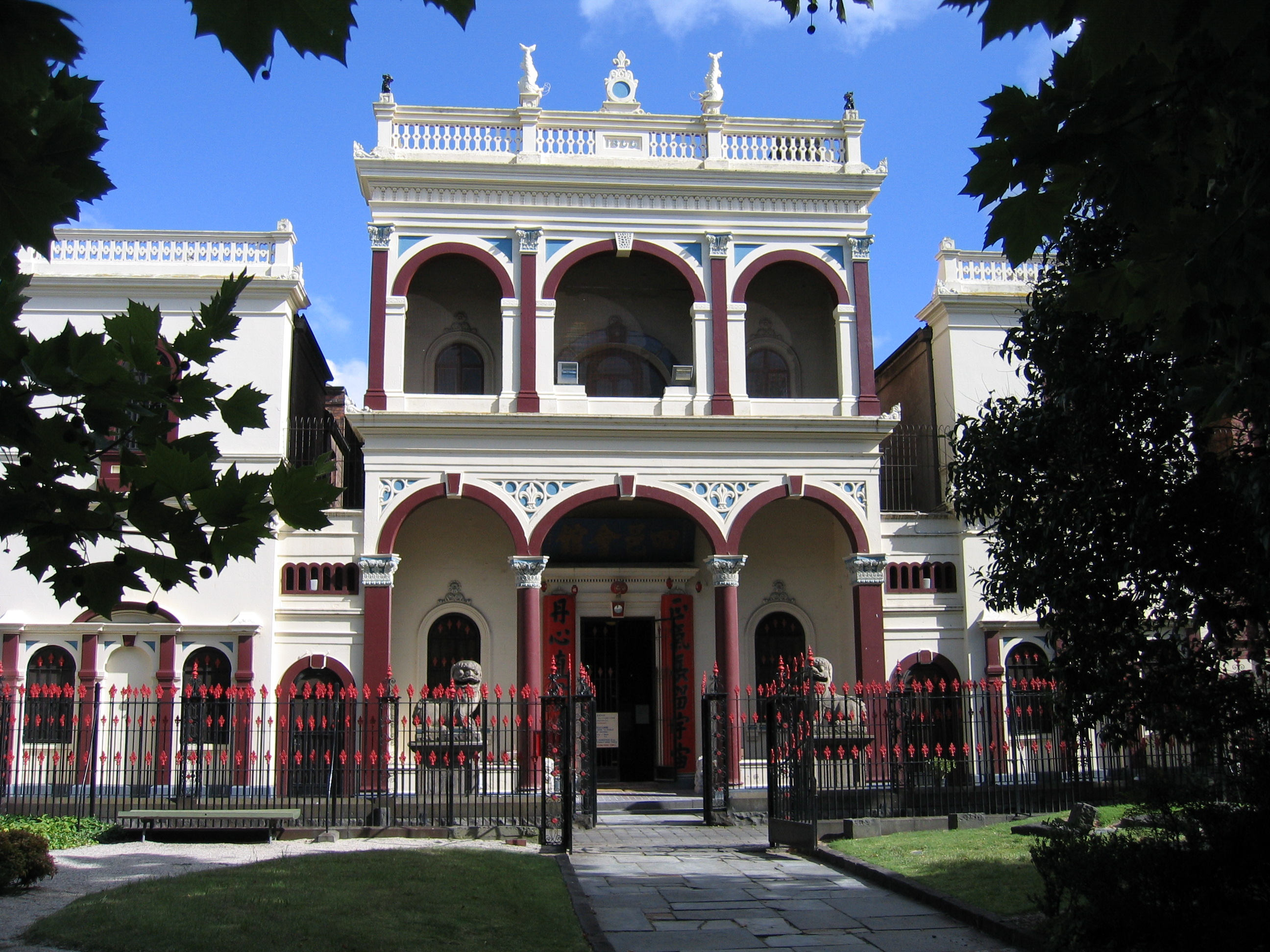

Religion
- Affiliation: Taoist, Buddhist and Chinese folk religion
- Deity: Kuan Ti
- Ownership: See Yup Society
- Year consecrated: 1866

Location
- Location: 76 Raglan Street
- Municipality: South Melbourne
- State: Victoria
- Country: Australia
- Interactive map of See Yup Temple
- Coordinates: 37.8368°S 144.9631°E

The See Yup Temple (Chinese: 四邑關帝廟) is a heritage-listed Chinese temple located at 76 Raglan Street, South Melbourne, Victoria, Australia. The current building was erected in 1866 for the See Yup Society, as the principal centre of worship and death registry of descendants from the See Yup area in Victoria. The temple is dedicated to Kuan Ti. It also contains halls to Ts'ai Sheng Yeh, the Taoist God of Wealth and to Kuanyin, the Buddhist Goddess of Mercy and Compassion. It is the oldest surviving and continuously operating Chinese temple in Australia.

== History ==
The See Yup Society of Melbourne (四邑會館), who built, maintain and own the temple, was established in 1854 as a mutual self-help society to support those who came to Victoria from the See Yup area of Kwangtung province in southern China.

In 1855 they occupied double-storey wooden lodgings on the site and in 1856 constructed a temple there, which also acted as the See Yup Society offices. In 1866 they replaced building with three buildings: a main hall containing Guandi, a hall containing the God of Wealth and oldest memorial hall of the current temple, designed by architect George Wharton. A second memorial hall was constructed in 1901 to designs drawn by Harold Desbrowe Annear.

After representations from the National Trust, the See Yup Society undertook major repairs and renovations to the building in 1974, with the restored temple was opened to the public in 1976.

The Kuanyin Pavilion was added in 2002, designed by Cheung Sui Fung, a senior member of the Royal Australian Institute of Architects. A third memorial hall was constructed in 2004.

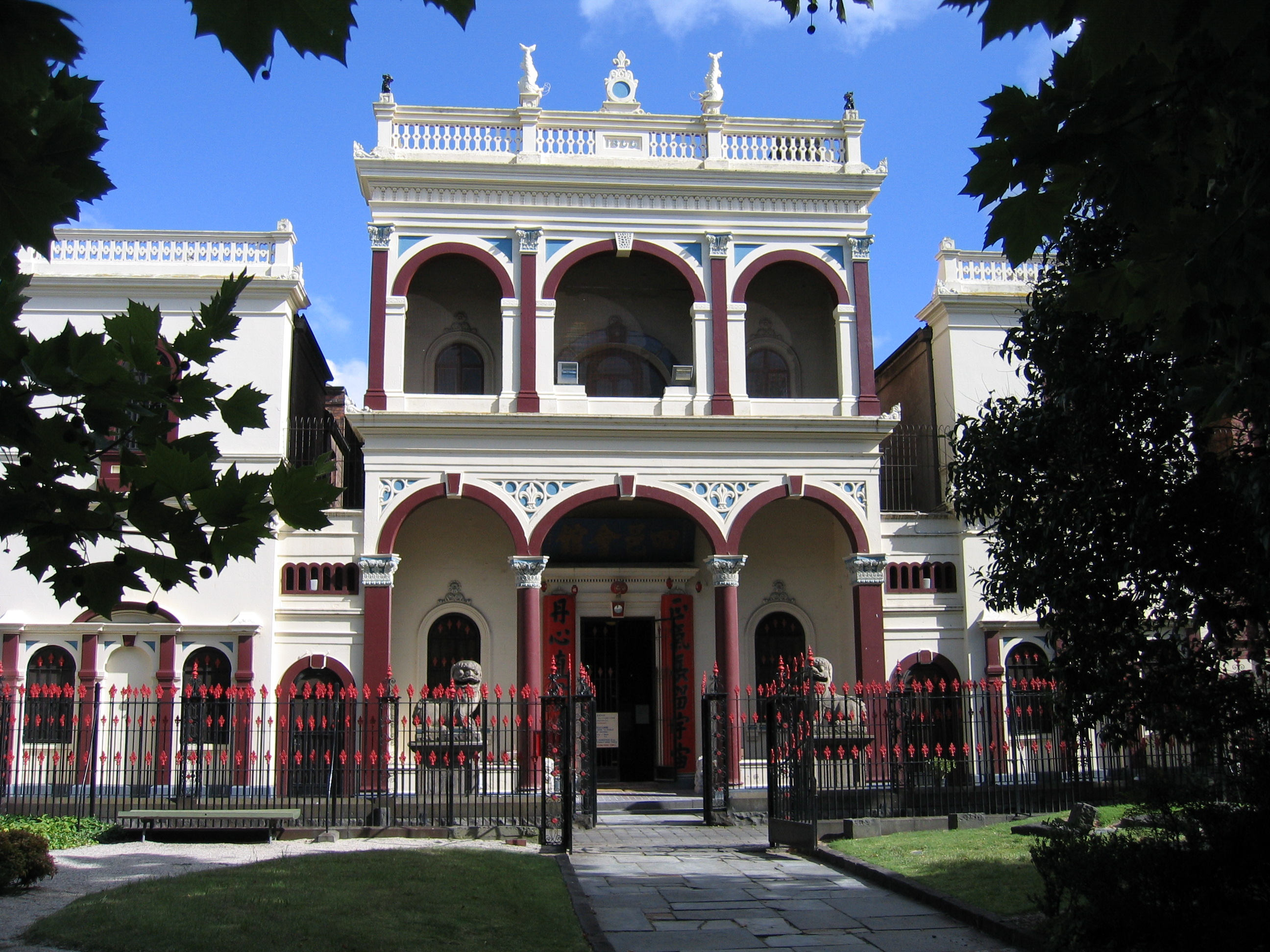
Facade of the main hall and gardens, 2005

=== Historical significance ===
In 1964 the Victorian government classified the temple as being of 'Regional' significance. In 1966 this was revised to the level of 'State' significance. In 1978 the temple was registered as a building of historical and architectural importance on the Register of the National Estate.

The temple contains artefacts that date back to the time of its construction and a few items from the 1856 temple building. Embedded in an inner wall are two large stone tablets (stelae) that record the names of the organisers, community representatives, and individual donors responsible for the building's 1866 reconstruction.

A ceremonial dragon head stored at the temple has been identified as having paraded at the Federation of Australia in 1901. It is one of the five oldest surviving imperial dragons in the world.

== 2024 fire ==
On 17 February 2024, the temple was damaged by fire. Firefighters arrived about 8:00 - 9:00 pm when smoke was billowing from the second floor and roof. An initial assessment of the damage revealed that it was confined solely to the main building, the Guan Di Temple Building. Despite the extensive damage, the Guan Di altar remained untouched by the fire. Many fragile and intricate artifacts emerged from the fire with limited damage. The Ancestral halls and adjacent buildings housing the God of Fortune and Kuan Yi remain unaffected. In September 2024, the Victorian government has awarded a $60,000 grant to aid the temple's restoration after the fire. It is hoped the temple can be returned to its pre-fire glory by 2026.

The Temple will be open every day from 7 February to 8 March 2026, 9.00 am to 4.00 pm. On 16 February (Lunar New Year’s Eve), the Temple will remain open until late. After the 8 March, the Temple will return to its regular weekend opening hours. Thanks to a permit granted by Heritage Victoria, a temporary marquee hall will be constructed in the temple’s front grounds, allowing the worship of Kwan Tai and Tai Sui during Lunar New Year celebrations. This arrangement ensures that it remains spiritually fitting to open the rest of the temple complex, including the Kuan Yum Pavilion, the God of Fortune hall and the ancestral halls. Additionally, the plan is to keep the temple open on weekends (Saturdays and Sundays) following the Chinese New Year period, allowing continued access for visitors and worshippers.

The National Trust of Australia (Victoria) has established a Restoration Appeal to assist repairs to the temple caused by the fire. Tax deductible donations can be made at: https://www.givenow.com.au/seeyuptemplerecovery
