= Geshe Sonam Thargye =

Geshe Sonam Thargye is the Spiritual Director of the Drol Kar Buddhist Centre in Anglesea, Victoria, Australia. He was born in the province of Kham, in eastern Tibet in 1962. After many years of studying Buddhist philosophy and practicing at Sera Je Monastic University in South India, he graduated in 1994 with the degree of Geshe Lharumpa. He established residence in Australia in 1998.

Geshe Sonam initiated an Australian tour by the Dalai Lama which took place in May 2002. In 2003, he created, with Australian artist Sue Ford, a multimedia artwork called Mind of Tibet.

== See also ==
- Gelug
- Lam Rim
