= Geshe Acharya Thubten Loden =

Geshe Acharya Thubten Loden was the spiritual leader of the Tibetan Buddhist Society in Australia. Geshe Loden established the Peaceful Land of Joy Meditation Centre in Yuroke, Victoria, and has written many books. In 2011, he was named Hume Citizen of the Year.

== History ==
Born in 1924, Geshe Loden became a monk at seven years old. After completing extensive Buddhist philosophy studies, he received the Geshe Lharampa degree from Sera Je Monastery in Tibet, and an Acharya degree from Varanasi's Sanskrit university in India. He was also awarded a Master's qualification in Vajrayana Buddhism after many years study at Gyudmed Tantric College. Geshe Loden originally came to Australia in 1976 at the invitation of Lama Thubten Yeshe to be the resident teacher at Chenrezig Institute, Queensland, where he remained for three years before leaving to start his own organization. He passed in 2011.

== Books ==
Geshe Loden has written many books on Tibetan Buddhism, including:

- Great Treasury of Mahamudra (2009)
- Essence of the Path to Enlightenment (1997)
- Meditations on the Path to Enlightenment (1996)
- The Fundamental Potential for Enlightenment (1996)
- Path to Enlightenment in Tibetan Buddhism (1993)

== See also ==
- Dalai Lama
- Gelug
- Lam Rim
