= Bhante Sujato =

Australian Theravada Buddhist monk

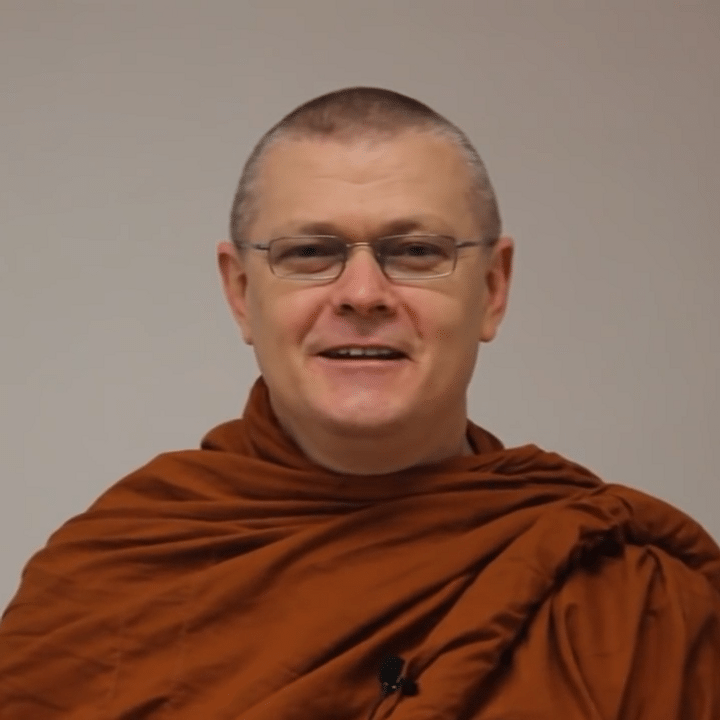

Personal life
- Born: Anthony Best; November 4, 1966 (age 59) Perth, Western Australia
- Occupation: Bhikkhu (contemplative monk)
- Website: lokanta.github.io suttacentral.net discourse.suttacentral.net

Religious life
- Religion: Buddhism
- School: Theravada

Senior posting
- Teacher: Ajahn Brahm
- Based in: Sydney

Sujato, known as Ajahn Sujato or Bhikkhu Sujato (born Anthony Best), is an Australian Buddhist monk formerly ordained into the Thai forest lineage of Ajahn Chah and presently identifying with the Early Buddhist movement.

== Life ==
He is a former musician with the post punk alternative rock Australian band Martha's Vineyard, who had toured with, amongst others, Mick Hucknall's Simply Red, INXS, Annie Lennox' Eurythmics, and early proto-punk garage band The Saints before disbanding in 1990. He spent several years at Bodhinyana Monastery in Western Australia before going on to found Santi Forest Monastery in 2003 where he served as the abbot. Following Sujato's wishes, Santi became a bhikkhunī (Buddhist nun) vihara in 2012, and he returned to live in Bodhinyana Monastery.

=== Monastic work ===
In 2005, Sujato co-founded the Buddhist website SuttaCentral along with Rod Bucknell and John Kelly, to provide access to Early Buddhist texts in their original language and make translations available in modern languages. After being unable to secure copyright-free digital translations of the Pali Canon for SuttaCentral, Sujato moved to the island of Chimei, off the coast of Taiwan, to undertake the task of creating English translations of the four Nikāyas, living there from 2015 to 2018. These translations have since been published on SuttaCentral, and as free edition books.

In 2019, Sujato moved to Sydney to establish Lokanta Vihara (the Monastery at the End of the World) with his long term student, Bhante Akaliko, to explore what it means to follow the Buddha's teachings in an era of climate change, globalised consumerism, and political turmoil. He is also involved with Engaged Buddhism.In a Buddhist Dharma talk entitled I am an anarchist for Dhammanet, Sujato states his anarchist ideology, specifically aligning himself with anarcho-pacifism, which he explains as being compatible with the Buddha, Buddhism, lay man and lay women's practice and the renunciant life, as well as being in accord with the monastic vinaya. In the speech, Sujato explains his belief that the Buddha himself was also an anarchist.

=== Bhikkhuni ===
Sujato along with his teacher Ajahn Brahm were involved with Re-establishing Bhikkhuni Ordination in the Forest sangha of Ajahn Chah. Sujato along with other scholars such as Brahm and Analayo had come to the conclusion that there was no valid reason the extinct bhikkhuni order couldn't be re-established. The ordination ceremony led to Brahm's expulsion from the Thai Forest Lineage of Ajahn Chah. Sujato however, was not deterred or intimidated by such a response, and, remaining faithful to his convictions that there was no reason the Bhikkhunī order should not be revived, went on to successfully found Santi Forest Monastery, and following Sujato's wishes, Santi has since flourished as a Bhikkhunī (Buddhist nun) monastery Vihara since 2012.

== See also ==
- Anarchism in Australia

== Bibliography ==
- Sujato (2012), A History of Mindfulness (PDF), Santipada, ISBN 9781921842108
- Sujato (2012), A Swift Pair of Messengers: Calm with Insight in the Buddha's Words, Santipada, ISBN 9781921842023
- Sujato (2012), Sects & Sectarianism: The Origins of Buddhist Schools, Santipada, ISBN 9781921842085
- Sujato (2012), Bhikkhuni Vinaya Studies: Research and Reflections on Monastic Discipline for Buddhist Nuns, Santipada, ISBN 9781921842146
- Sujato (2012), White Bones Red Rot Black Snakes (PDF), Santipada, ISBN 9781921842030
- Sujato; Brahmali, Bhikkhu (2015), The Authenticity of the Early Buddhist Texts (PDF), Chroniker Press, ISBN 9781312911505
