= Chung Tian Temple =

Chan Buddhist temple in Queensland, Australia

Fo Guang Shan Chung Tian Temple
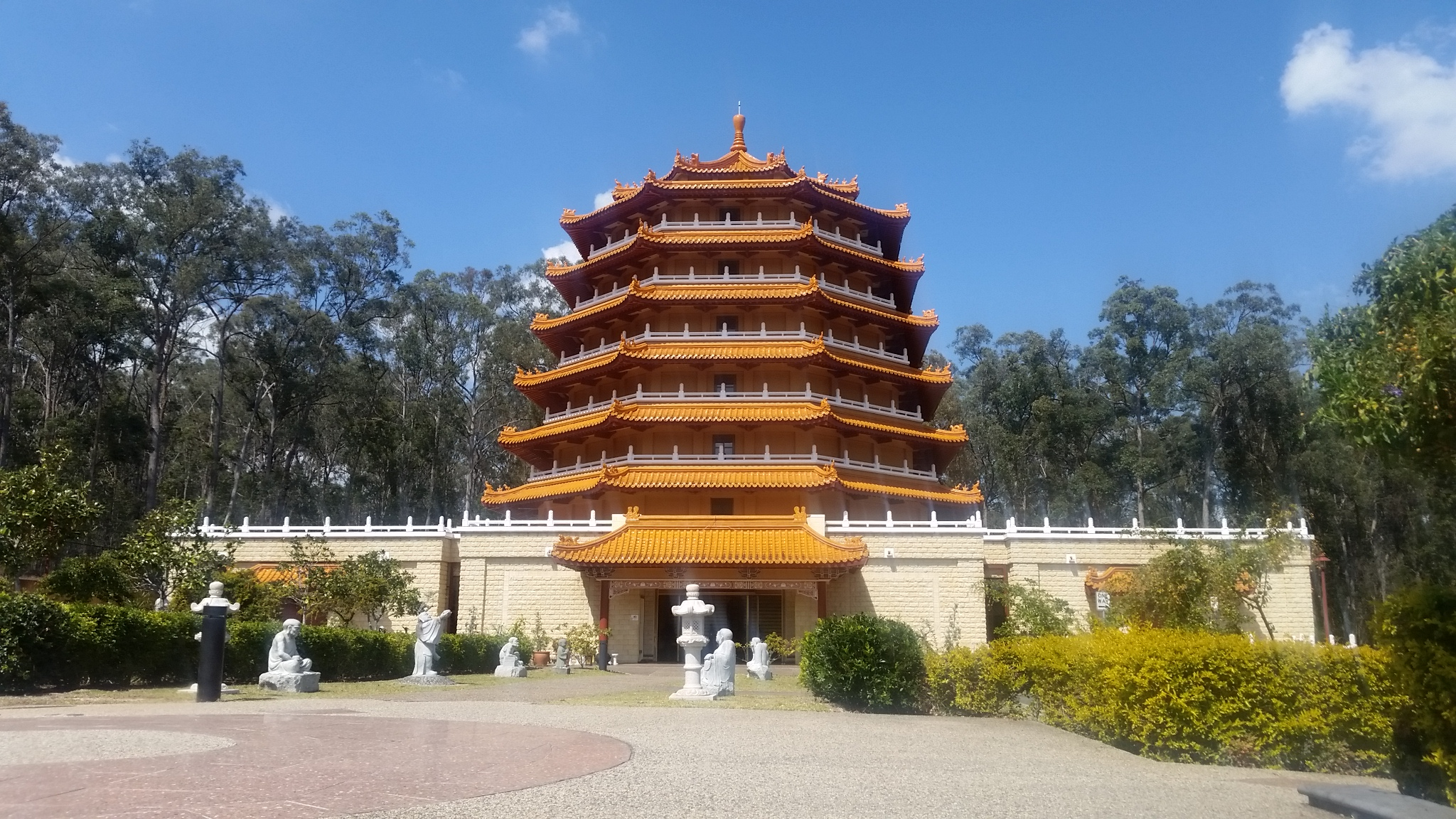
- The seven-tiered style of Chung Tian’s Pagoda

- Location within Australia

Religion
- Affiliation: Buddhist
- Sect: Fo Guang Shan

Location
- Country: Australia
- Coordinates: 27°36′11.99″S 153°09′04.39″E

Architecture
- Completed: June 1993

Chung Tian Temple (Chinese: 中天寺; pinyin: Zhōng tiān sì; lit. 'Middle Heaven Temple') is a Chan Buddhist temple located at 1034 Underwood Road, Priestdale, Queensland, Australia. The temple is part of the Fo Guang Shan Buddhist monastic order. Construction of the temple began in January 1991 and it opened in June 1993. Chung Tian Temple was founded by Venerable Master Hsing Yun, who is also the founder of the Fo Guang Shan Buddhist order.

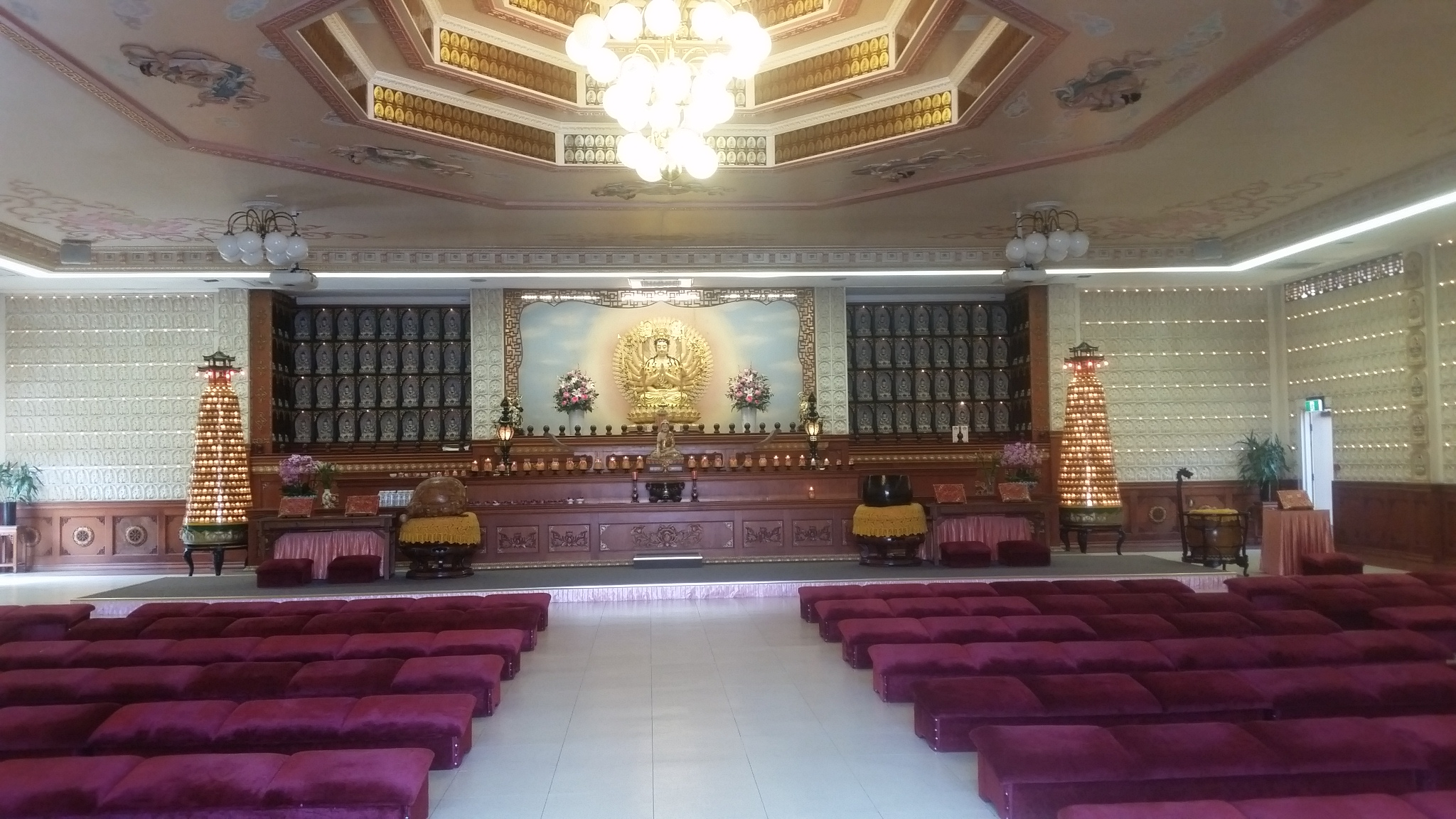
Bodhisattva Hall

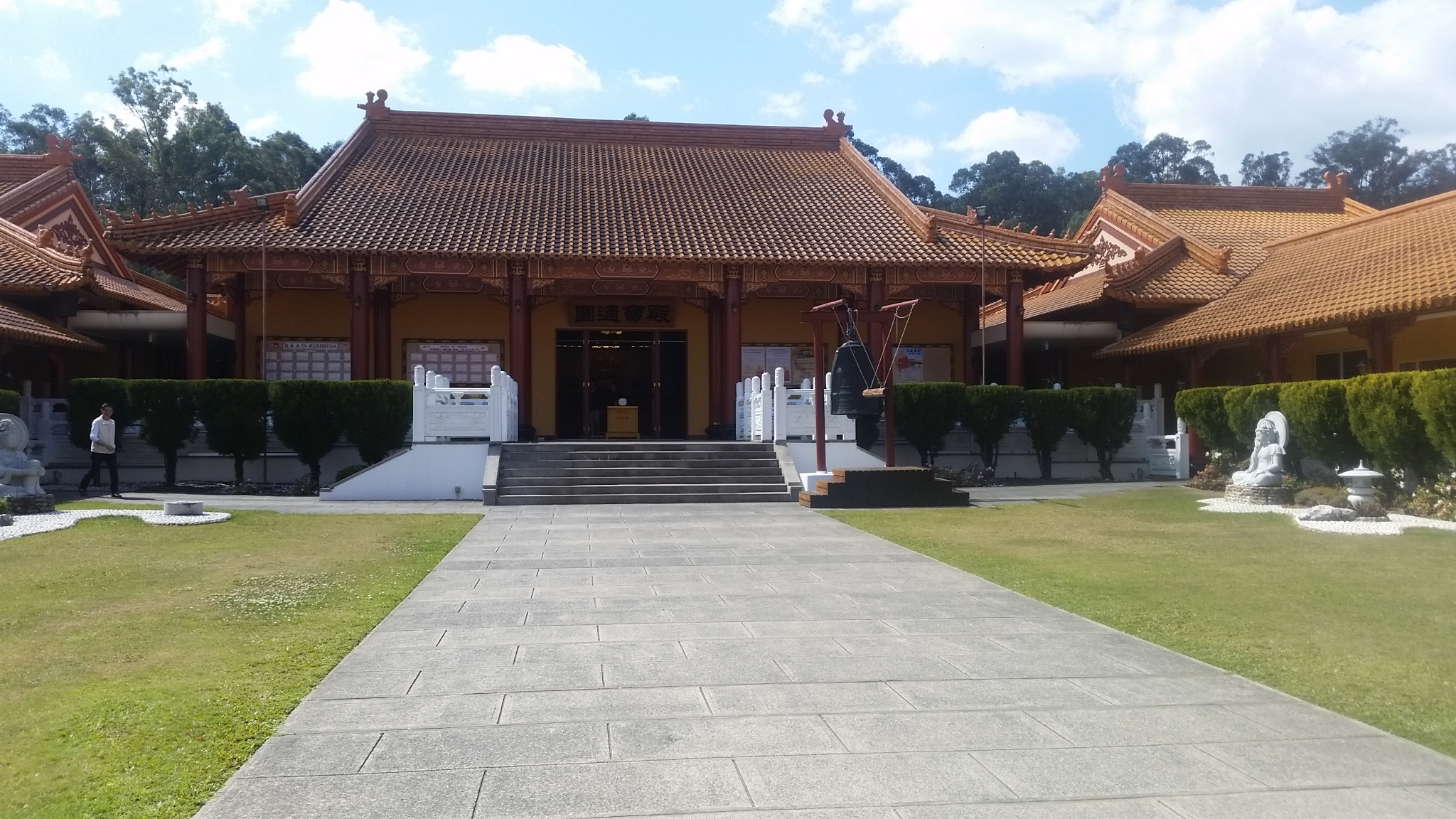
Chung Tian main building overview

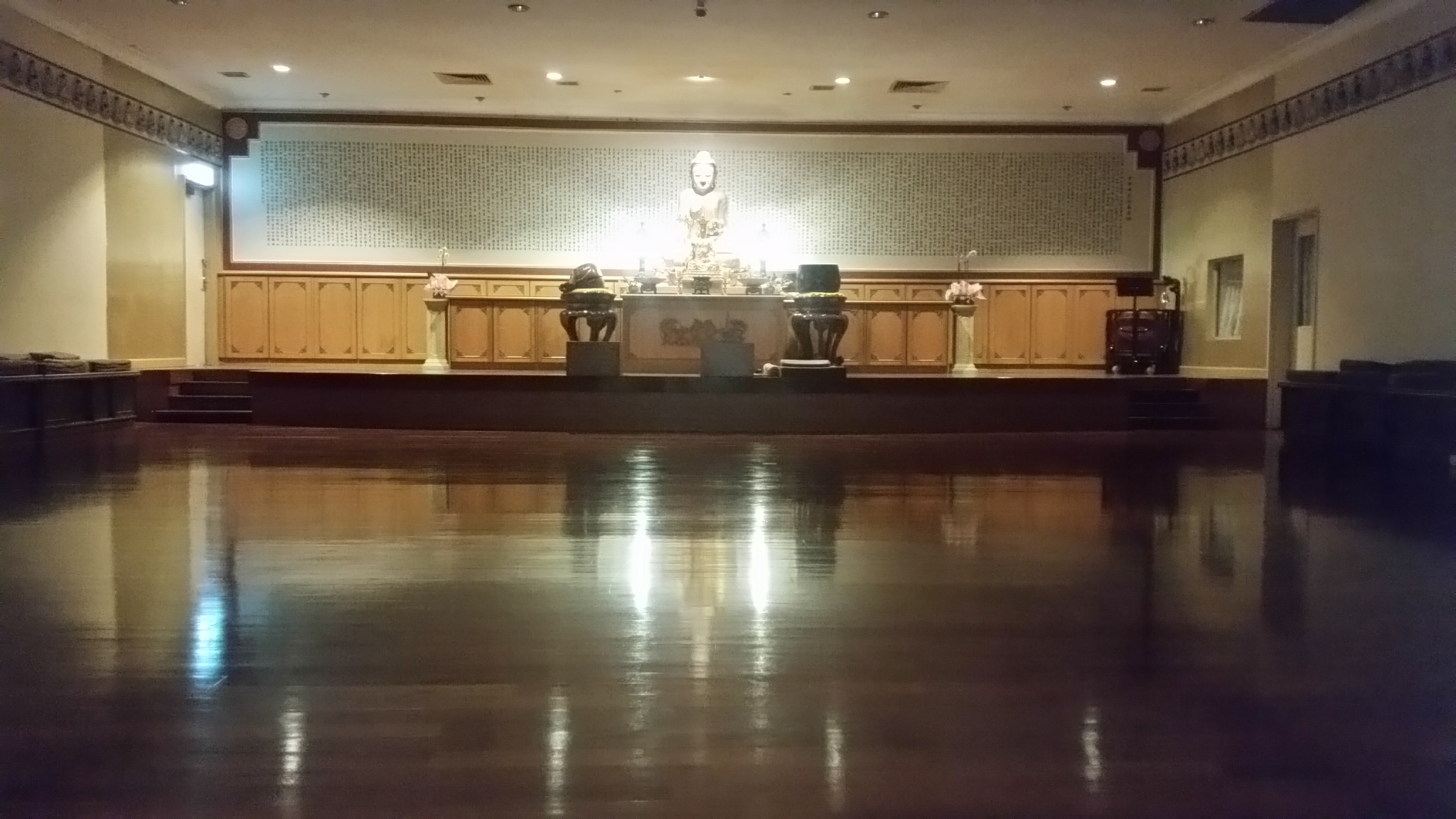
Meditation Hall

== Overview ==
The Temple attempts to provide a peaceful venue for the community including visitors with their multicultural diversity and multi-faith harmony through Humanistic Buddhism.

== Program and opening hour ==
Chung Tian Temple provides public with some programs below. The details of latest timetable can be checked by on external 3rd party web site

- Meditation class: Every Sunday 9 am to 12 pm - there are three levels of meditation class related with experience of meditation.

- Contents: Theories of meditation, Breathing for meditation, posture for meditation

- Buddhism class for children : Every Sunday 9am to 12 pm
- Chinese language class:

- 9 am to 12 pm - Saturday morning : Chinese native students - Sunday morning : international students - levels : seven classes from age five to seventeen.

== Building and facilities ==
- It is one of the Points of Interest & Landmarks, Sights in QLD
- Chinese School : 8 class rooms and it is registered to QLD Government Chinese Language School.
- There are several buildings on the site: Bodhisattva Hall, meditation room, restaurant, Lecture Room
- the highest building on the site: the seven-tiered style of Chung Tian's Pagoda

== Activities and cultural performances ==
- It is one of the five most-popular tourist sites in Brisbane QLD.
- Children's Happy camp: Two days schedule during September or October each year
- Celebration of Chinese New Year:

The Temple offers the food, funfair, children's activities, Cultural performances, a Light Offering Blessing Service with a Chinese Lion Dance and cultural performances before the date of the Chinese new year.

== See also ==
- IBPS Manila
- Zu Lai Temple
- Nan Hua Temple
- Hsi Lai Temple
- Buddhism in South Africa
- Fo Guang Shan Buddha Museum
- Fo Guang Shan Temple, Auckland
