= Sunnataram Forest Monastery =

Theravada Buddhist monastery in the Southern Highlands of Australia

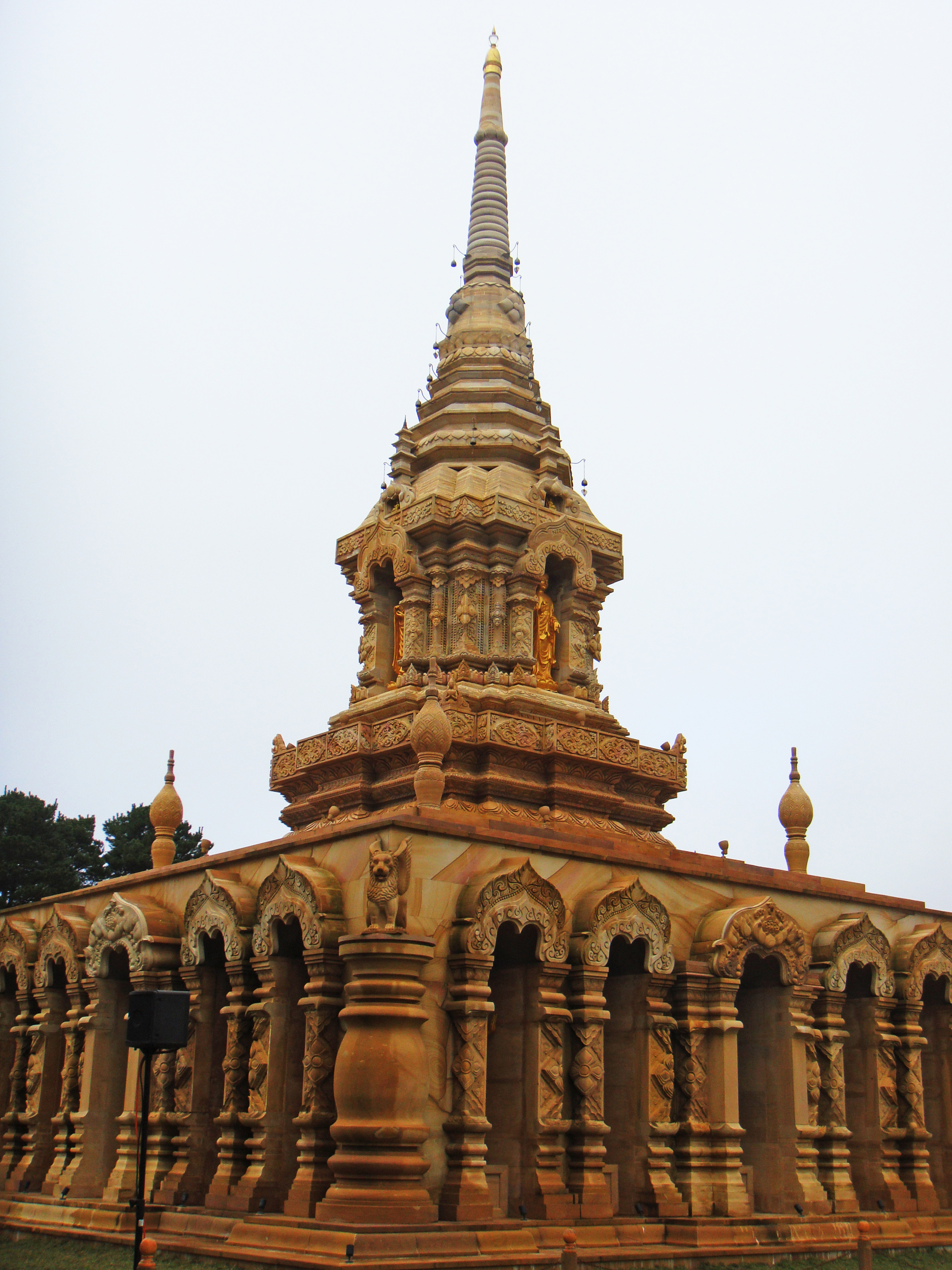
- The temple at Sunnataram Forest Monastery

- Location within Australia

Religion
- Affiliation: Buddhist
- Sect: Theravada Buddhist Suan Mokkh

Location
- Location: Southern Highlands, New South Wales
- Country: Australia
- Interactive map of Sunnataram Forest Monastery
- Coordinates: 34°41′28″S 150°14′38″E

Architecture
- Founder: Phra Ajahn Yantra
- Completed: 1989

Website
- https://www.sunnataram.org/

Sunnataram Forest Monastery is a Theravada Buddhist monastery in the Thai Forest Tradition. The establishment of the monastery was in July 1990. It is situated on the outer lying area of the town Bundanoon in the Southern Highlands. The elevation of the area is 2,205 feet (672 m) above sea level. An area of 99.7 acres (403,000 m^{2}) of bush land is covered by the monastery.

== Gallery ==
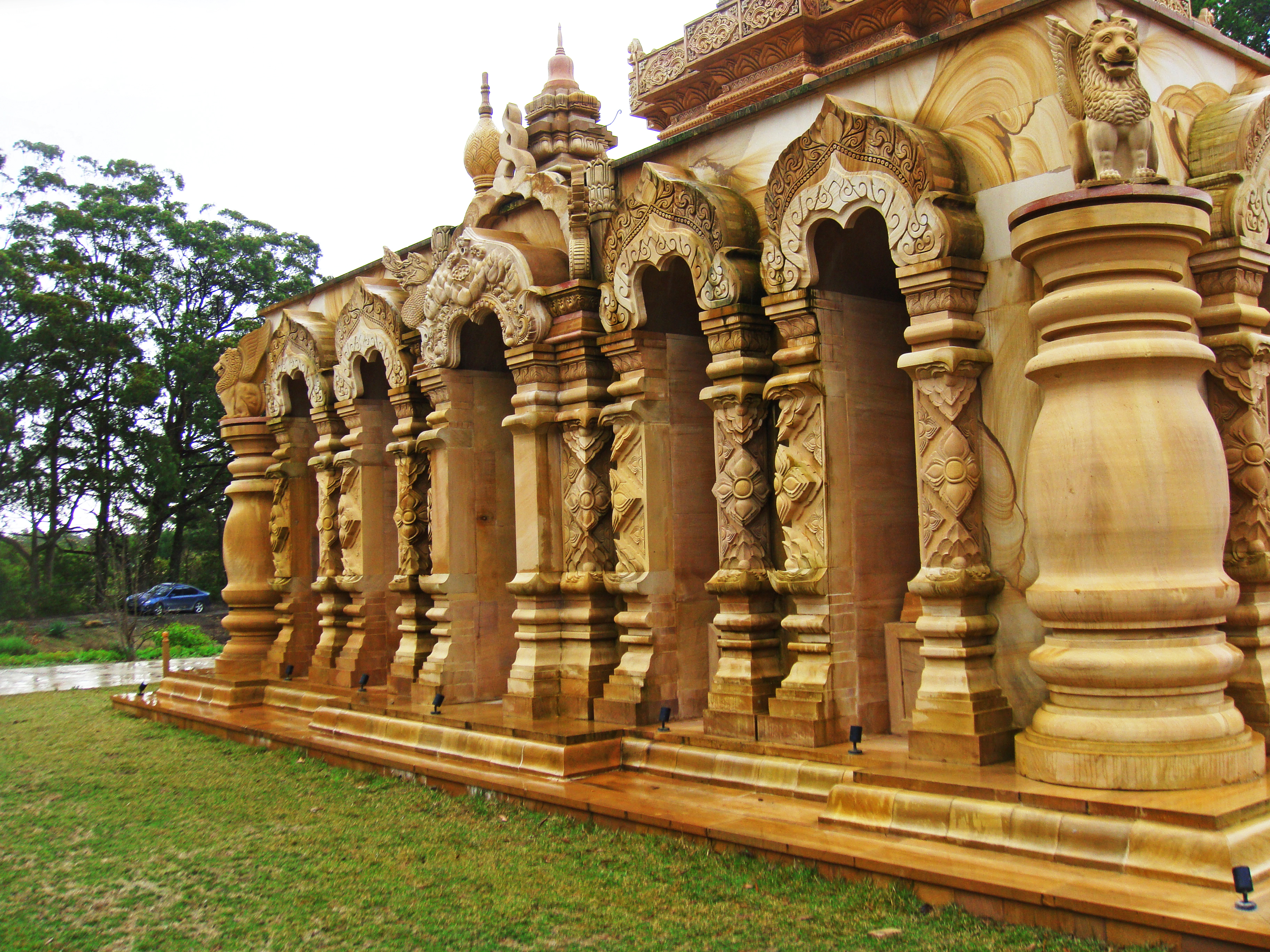

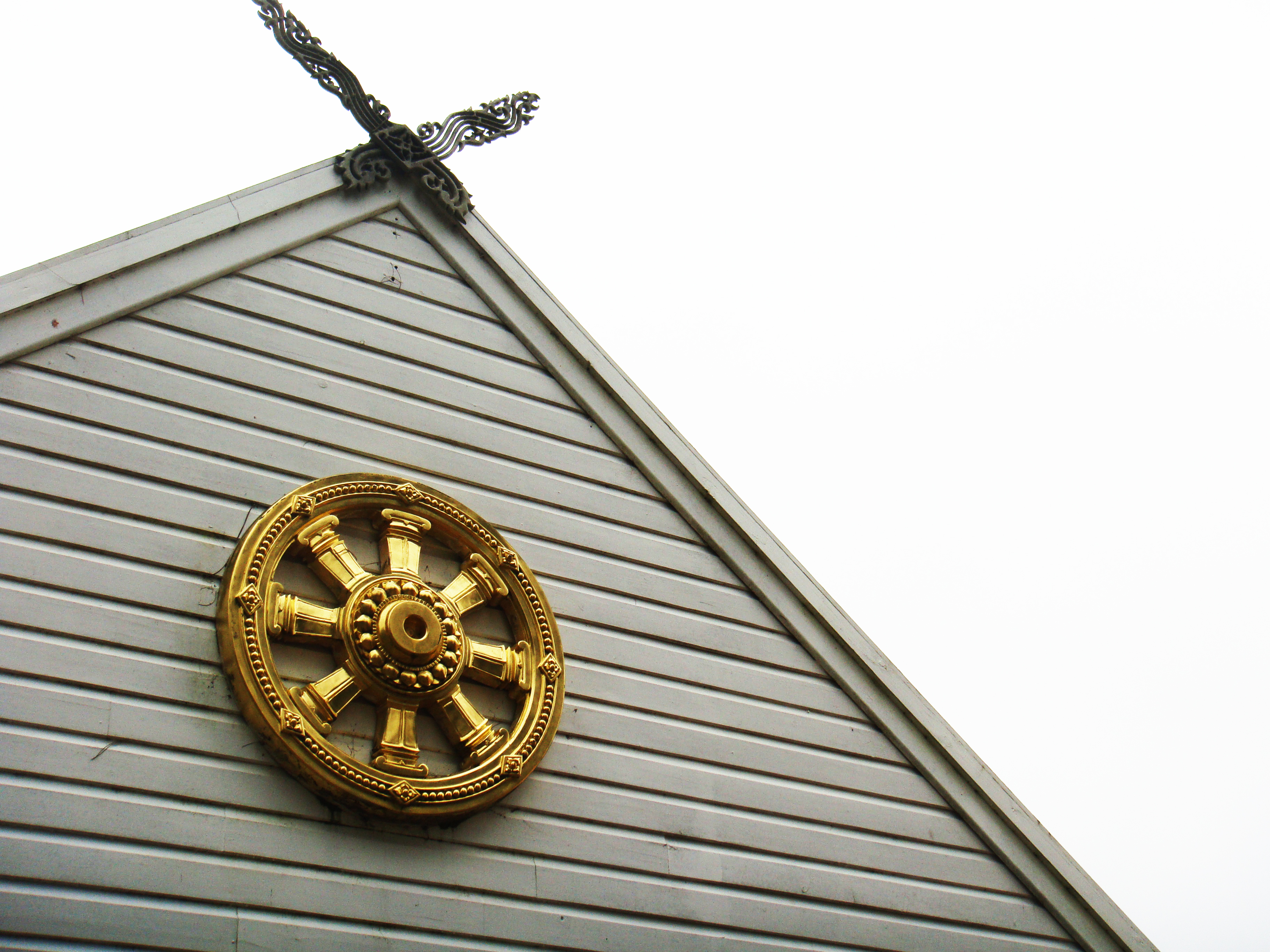

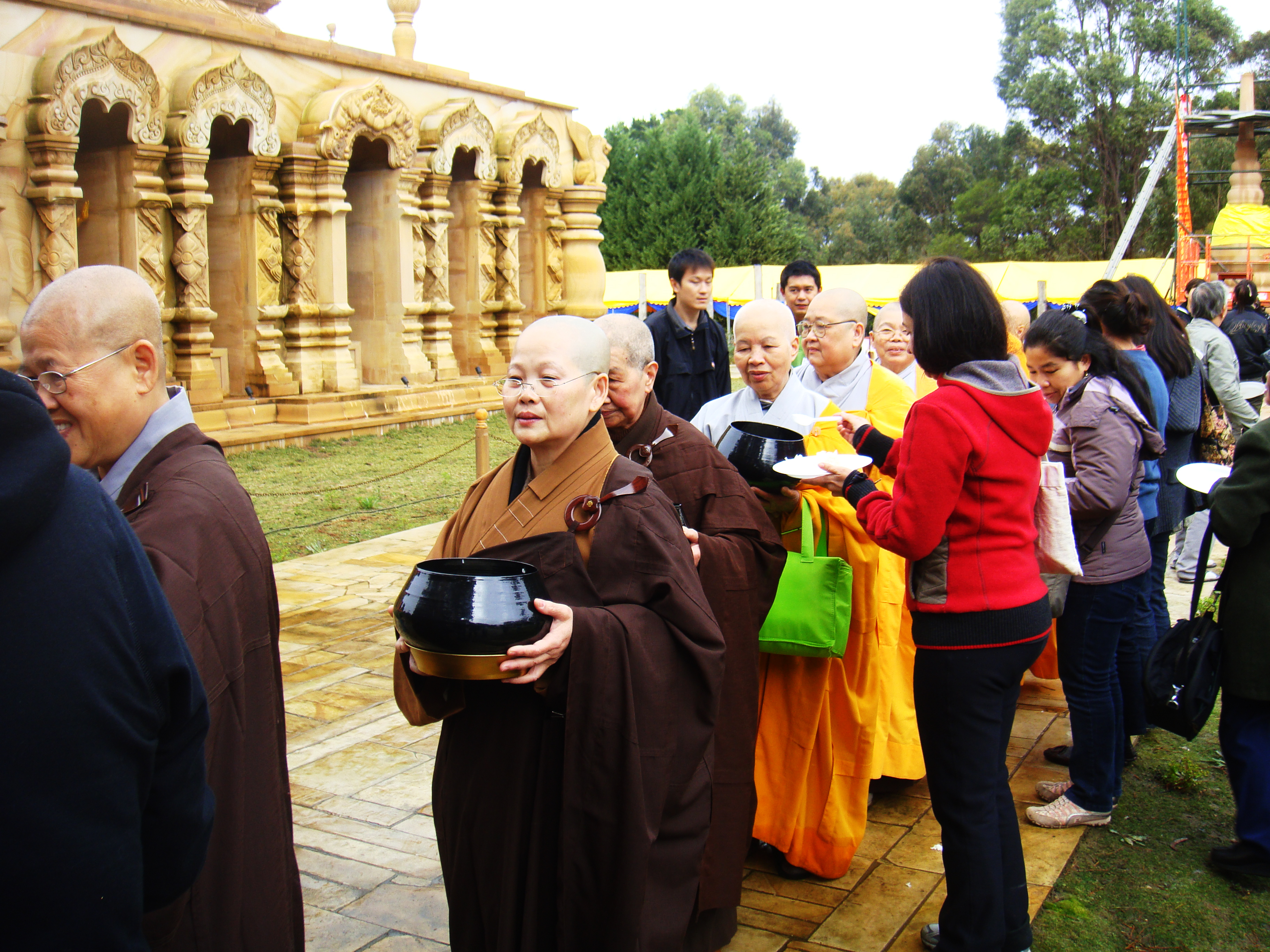
