= Wat Pa Ban Tat =

Buddhist temple located in the Udon Thani province of Thailand

Coordinates: 17°18′N 102°47′E

Wat Pa Ban Tat Buddhist Monastery
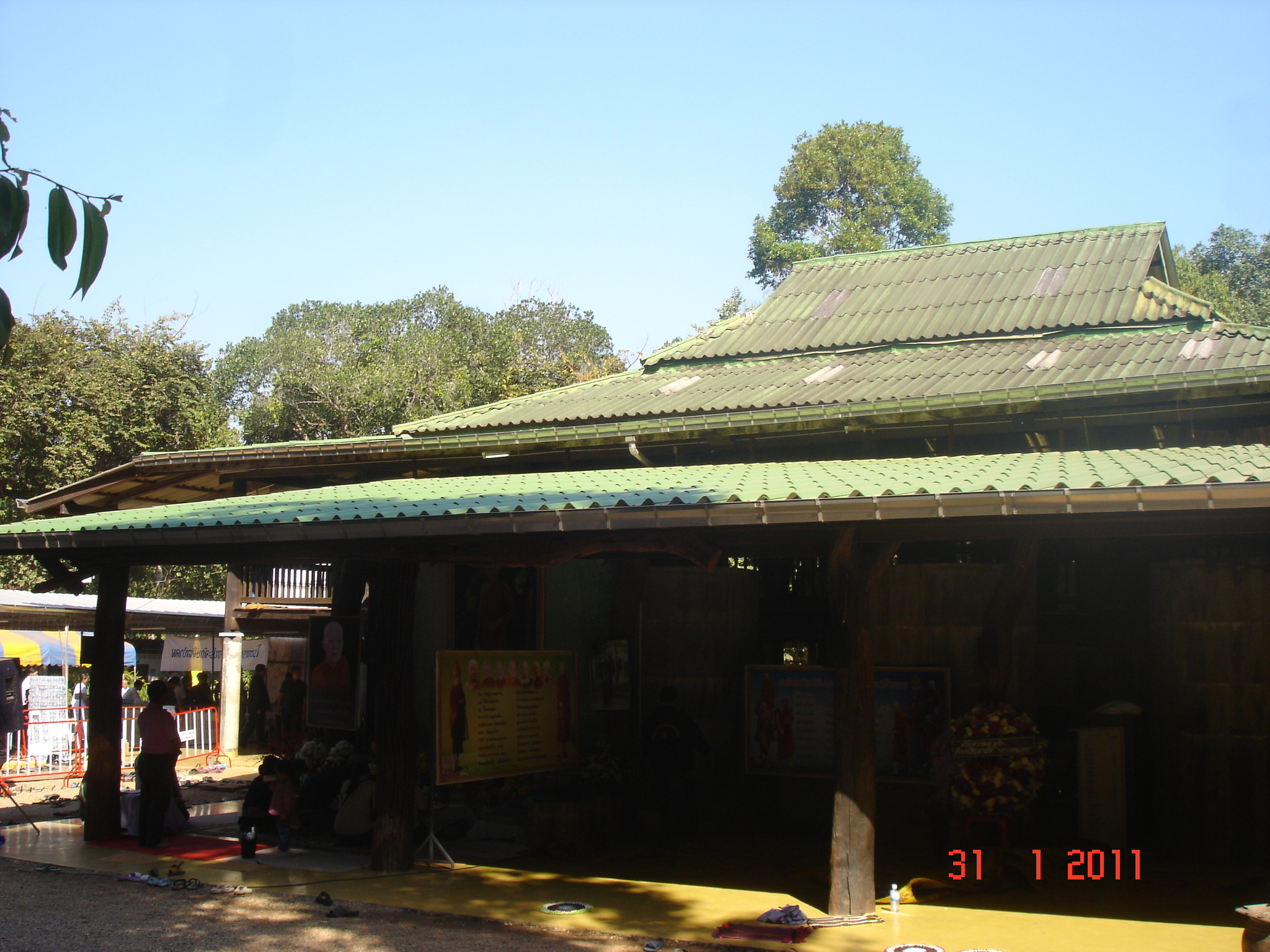

Religion
- Affiliation: Thai Forest Tradition

Location
- Location: Wat Pa Ban Tat, Ban Tat, Amphoe Mueang, Udon Thani, 41000 Thailand
- Country: Thailand
- Interactive map of Wat Pa Ban Tat Buddhist Monastery

Architecture
- Founder: Venerable Ajahn Maha Bua Mahathera

Website
- Luangta.com

Wat Pa Baan Taad; Thai วัดป่าบ้านตาด) is a Theravada Buddhist monastery (Wat), located in the Udon Thani Province of Thailand. Wat Pa Ban Tat was founded by a Thai meditator Bhikkhu, Ajahn Maha Bua.

== History ==
In 1950, Ajahn Maha Bua was living in the Huey Sai village located in what is now Mukdahan Province. After learning that his mother was ill he returned to his village near Udon Thani to look after her. Back at home, villagers and relatives requested that he should settle in the forested area of the south village. They additionally asked him to reside there permanently. Through the donation of land (approximately 64 acres (260,000 m^{2})), he was able to establish a monastery. Considering that his mother was very old and that he was to look after her, he accepted the offer and began to build this monastery in November 1955. It was named Wat Pa Ban Tat.

"This monastery has always been a place for meditation. Since the beginning it has been a place solely for developing the mind. I haven‘t let any other work disturb the place. If there are things which must be done, I‘ve made it a rule that they take up no more time than is absolutely necessary. The reason for this is that, in the eyes of the world and the Dhamma, this is a meditation temple. We‘re meditation monks. The work of the meditation monk was handed over to him on the day of his ordination by his Preceptor - in all its completeness. This is his real work, and it was taught in a form suitable for the small amount of time available during the ordination ceremony - five meditation objects to be memorized in forward and reverse order - and after that it‘s up to each individual to expand on them and develop them to whatever degree of breadth or subtlety he is able to. In the beginning the work of a monk is given simply as: Kesa - hair of the head, Loma - hair of the body, Nakha - nails, Danta - teeth, Taco - the skin which enwraps the body. This is the true work for those monks who practice according to the principles of Dhamma as were taught by the Lord Buddha.“

== Relics of Ariyas ==
In a display case, there are urns containing the relics of Ajahn Sao Kantasilo Mahathera, Ajahn Mun, and Acariya Sing Khatayakhamo of Wat Pa Salawan. There are also pictures of Acariya Waen Suchinno, Venerable Acariya Khao Analayo, Venerable Ajahn Lee Dhammadharo of Wat Asokaram, and Venerable Ajahn Fun Ajaro.

== See also ==
- Wat Pah Nanachat
- Wat Aranyawiwake
- Ajahn Maha Bua
- Ajahn Mun
