= Ajahn Maha Bua =

Buddhist monk of Thai Forest Tradition (1913–2011)

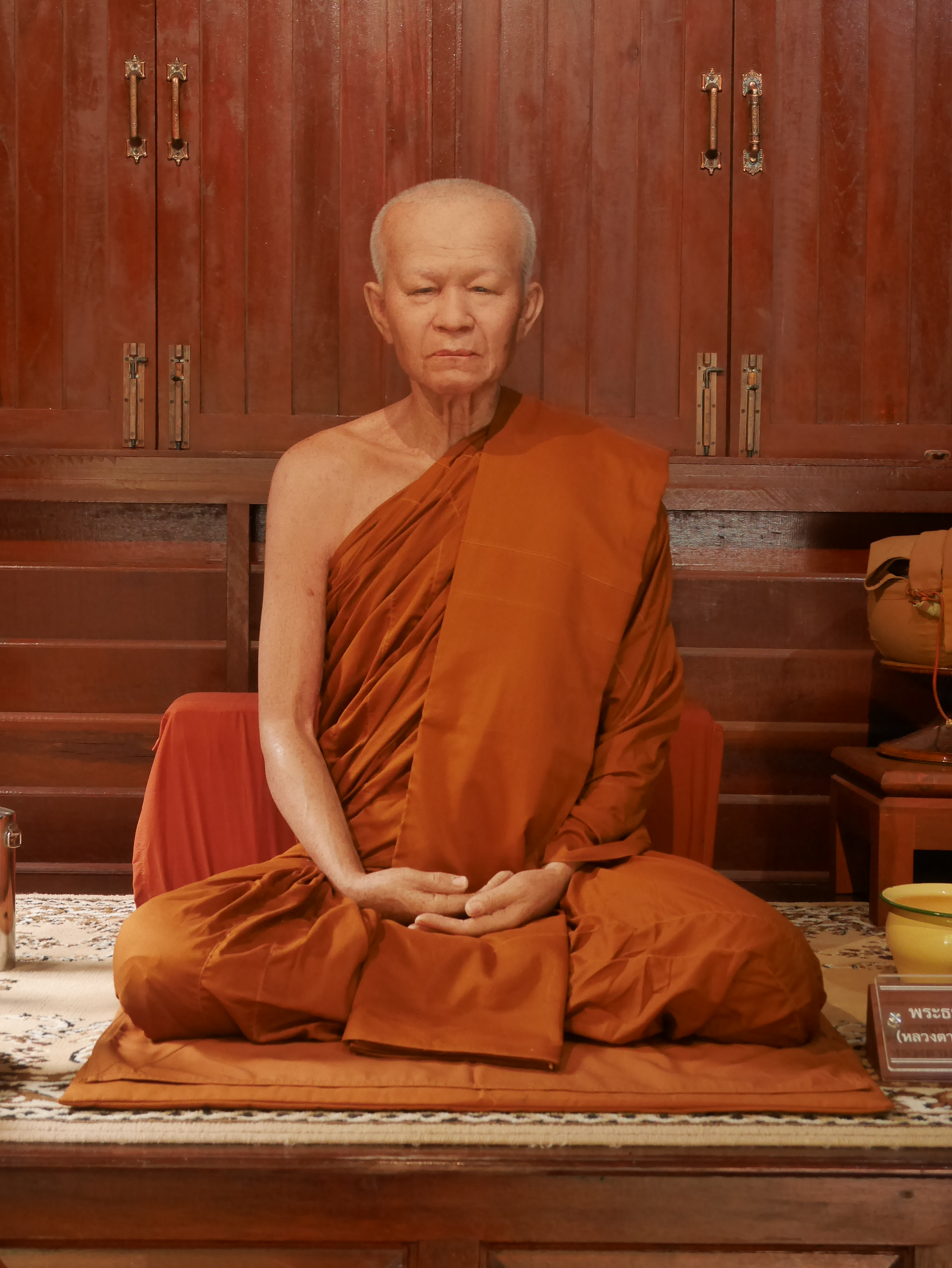

Personal life
- Born: Bua Lohitdi บัว โลหิตดี 12 August 1913 Udon Thani, Thailand
- Died: 30 January 2011 (aged 97) Udon Thani, Thailand
- Website: Luangta.eu

Religious life
- Religion: Buddhism
- Order: Dhammayuttika Nikaya
- School: Theravāda
- Lineage: Thai Forest Tradition
- Dharma name: Ñāṇasampanno ญาณสมฺปนฺโน
- Monastic name: Phra Dhammavisuddhimaṅgala พระธรรมวิสุทธิมงคล
- Ordination: 12 May 1934 (aged 20)

Senior posting
- Teacher: Ajahn Mun Bhuridatta
- Post: Abbot of Wat Pa Baan Taad

Ajahn Maha Bua (12 August 1913 – 30 January 2011) was a Thai Buddhist monk. He was thought by many of his followers to be an arahant (someone who has attained full enlightenment). He was a disciple of the esteemed forest master Ajahn Mun Bhuridatta, and was himself considered a master in the Thai Forest Tradition. Following the death of Ajahn Thate in 1994, he was considered to be the Ajahn Yai (or head monk) of the Thai Forest Tradition lineage until his death in 2011.

== Name ==
Ajahn Maha Bua (Thai: อาจารย์มหาบัว) was also commonly known as Luang Ta Maha Bua (Thai: หลวงตามหาบัว). His birth name was Bua Lohitdi (Thai: บัว โลหิตดี), his Dhamma name (in the Pali language) was Ñāṇasampanno (Thai: ญาณสมฺปนฺโน; RTGS: Yanasampanno), and his monastic title was Phra Dhammavisuddhimaṅgala (Thai: พระธรรมวิสุทธิมงคล; RTGS: Phra Thammawisutthimongkhon).

== Biography ==
=== Early years ===
Bua was born in Baan Taad village in the northeastern province of Udon Thani. He was one of 16 children of a rich family of rice farmers. When he was 21, his parents asked him to enter the monkhood for a season, a Thai tradition to show gratitude towards one's parents. He entered Yothanimit monastery and was ordained on 12 May 1934, with Venerable Chao Khun Dhammachedi as his preceptor. His preceptor gave him the Pali name Ñāṇasampanno, meaning 'one endowed with wisdom'. At the time, Bua had no intention of remaining a monk for the rest of his life.

As Phra Ñāṇasampanno, he studied the incarnations of the Buddha and his Arahant Disciples. He has said he was so impressed that he decided to seek the same enlightenment as had the Buddha's original disciples. He tried to understand the ways of practicing the Dhamma (Dharma) which would eventually lead to Nibbana (Nirvana).

He studied Pali, the language of the Theravada Buddhist scriptures, as well as the Vinaya (the Buddhist monastic rules). After seven years, he passed the third level of Pali studies, and achieved the highest level in Dhamma and Vinaya studies. He then concentrated entirely on the practice of Dhamma in hopes of studying with Venerable Ajahn Mun, one of the most renowned meditation masters of his time.

=== Venerable Ajahn Mun ===
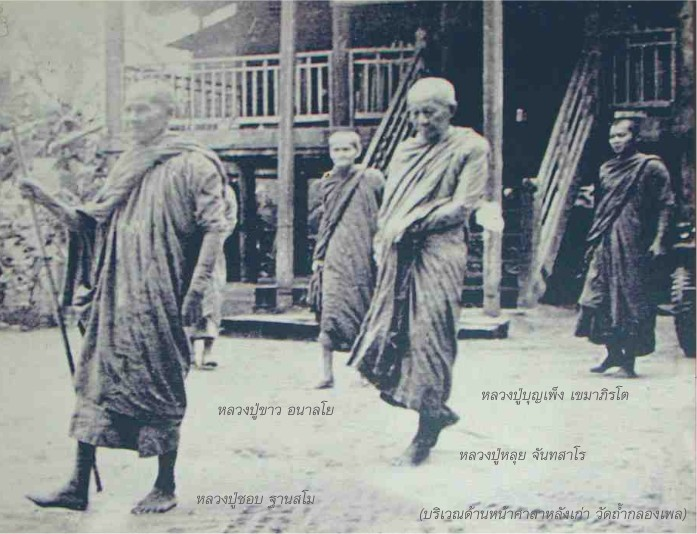
From left: Ven. Ajahn Chob Thanasamo, Ven. Luangpu Khao Analayo, Ven. Luangpu Louis Candasaro and Ven. Luang Pu Bunpeng Khemabhirato. The picture was probably taken at old main sala of Wat Pa Nongphue Na Nai in Sakol Nakhon.

Nanasampanno then went in search of Venerable Ajahn Mun. When he finally met him, he was pleased with his efforts, since it seemed as if Mun already knew his desires, intentions, and doubts. Mun clarified the questions in his mind and showed him the paths leading to Nibbana still exist. Nanasampanno said to himself:

"Now, I have come to the real thing. He has made everything clear and I no longer have doubts. It is now up to me to be true or otherwise. I'm determined to be true!"

He learned the meditation methods followed by Mun, based on the principles of Buddhism and the code of Buddhist discipline. He continued to follow these methods in his own teaching of monks and novices. Due to his deep respect and admiration for Mun, whom he likens to a father and mother to his students, he was inspired to write a biography of Mun to disseminate his methods of practice and document his character for coming generations. He has also written 'Wisdom develops samadhi' and "Patipada' His transcribed talks he gave to laypeople and monks have formed several hundred books in Thai language, but only a few of his talks have been translated into English. He solely focuses on the practice of Buddhist meditation and has only one aim for his disciples: Reaching the end of dukkha. Several hundred of talks given to his monk disciples were recorded and several thousand of talks given to laypeople, normally after the meal or in the evening were also recorded. He allowed them to be recorded, so that his fellow practitioners may have a guide in the practice of meditation.

=== Seclusion and establishing a monastery ===
In 1950, after the death of Mun, Bua sought a secluded place. He went to Huey Sai village in Mukdahan province. He was very strict and serious in teaching the monks and novices, both in the austere dhutanga practices and in meditation. He continued his teaching until these same principles became established amongst his followers.

Learning that his mother was ill, he returned home to look after her. Villagers and relatives requested that he settle permanently in the forest south of the village and no longer wander in the manner of a forest monk. As his mother was very old and that it was appropriate for him to look after her, he accepted the offer. With a donation of 64 acres (26 ha) of land, he began to build his monastery in November 1955. It was given the name Wat Pa Baan Taad.

=== Wat Pa Ban Taad ===
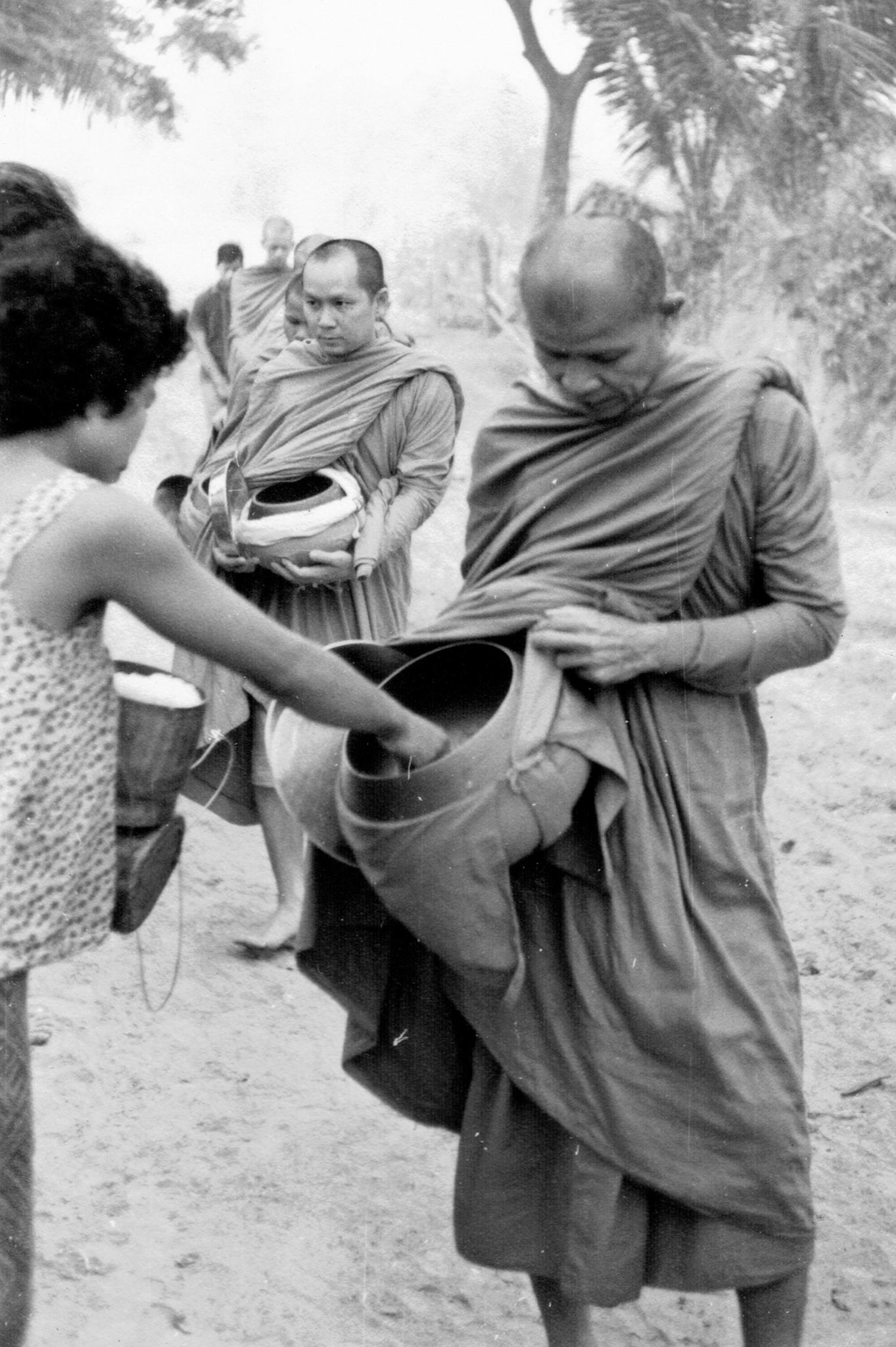
Ajahn Maha Bua led the monks (in this photo, he is followed by Phra Maha Amborn Ambaro, later the 20th Supreme Patriarch of Thailand) for morning alms around Baan Taad, Udon Thani, in 1965.

Bua said:

"This monastery has always been a place for meditation. Since the beginning it has been a place solely for developing the mind. I haven't let any other work disturb the place. If there are things which must be done, I've made it a rule that they take up no more time than is absolutely necessary. The reason for this is that, in the eyes of the world and the Dhamma, this is a meditation temple. We're meditation monks. The work of the meditation monk was handed over to him on the day of his ordination by his Preceptor — in all its completeness. This is his real work, and it was taught in a form suitable for the small amount of time available during the ordination ceremony — five meditation objects to be memorized in forward and reverse order — and after that it's up to each individual to expand on them and develop them to whatever degree of breadth or subtlety he is able to. In the beginning the work of a monk is given simply as: Kesa — hair of the head, Loma — hair of the body, Nakha — nails, Danta — teeth, Taco — the skin which enwraps the body. This is the true work for those monks who practice according to the principles of Dhamma as were taught by the Lord Buddha."

The wilderness surrounding the monastery has vanished, as it has now been cleared for cultivation. The forest inside the monastery is all that remains. Wat Pa Baan Taad preserves this remnant in its original condition, so that monks, novices, and lay people can use its tranquility for the practice of the Dhamma as taught by the Lord Buddha.

== Rise to fame ==
Bua has traveled to London to give lectures. He also founded the Help Thai Nation Project, a charitable effort dedicated to helping the Thai economy. He has been visited and supported by the King Bhumibol Adulyadej and Queen Sirikit of Thailand.

Bua's biographer wrote:

"Ven. Ajahn Maha Bua is well known for the fluency and skill of his Dhamma talks, and their direct and dynamic approach. They obviously reflect his own attitude and the way he personally practiced Dhamma. This is best exemplified in the Dhamma talks he gives to those who go to meditate at Wat Pa Bahn Tahd. Such talks usually take place in the cool of the evening, with lamps lit and the only sound being the insects and cicadas in the surrounding jungle. He often begins the Dhamma talk with a few moments of stillness — this is the most preparation he needs — and then quietly begins the Dhamma exposition. As the theme naturally develops, the pace quickens and those listening increasingly feel its strength and depth."

== Some basic teachings on the 'Citta' ==
Funeral urn for Ajahn Maha Bua, granted by King Bhumibol Adulyadej.

Queen Sirikit the Queen Mother and Princess Chulabhorn cremated the remains of Ajahn Maha Bua at Wat Pa Ban Taad in 2011, 5 March.

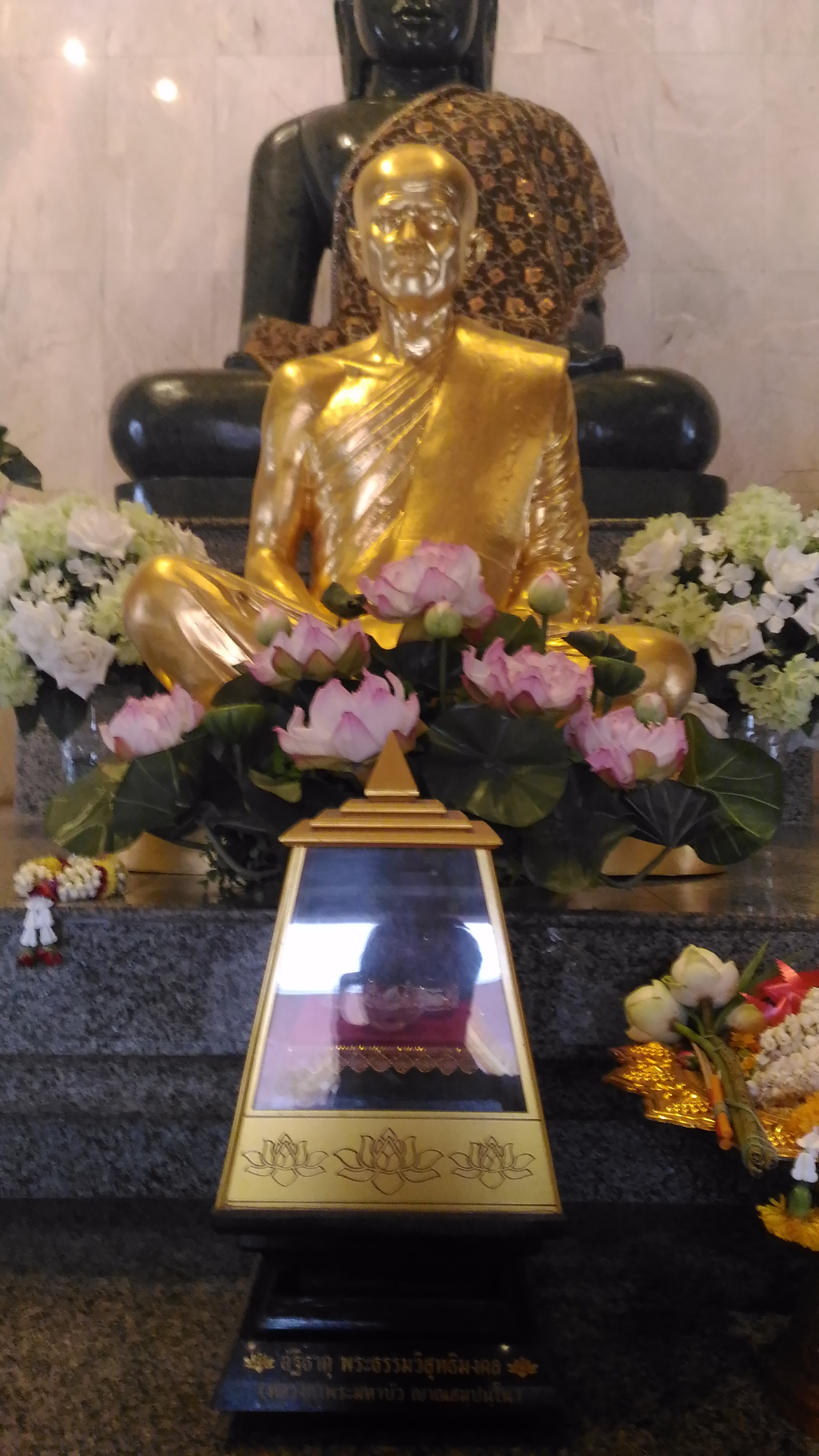
Statue and relics of Ajahn Maha Bua at Wat Bodhisombhorn, Udon Thani province

Bua observes the essential enduring truth of the sentient being as constituted of the indestructible reality of the citta (heart/mind). He has stated that as long as there is a nucleus of a Know-er (i.e. a 'self or Self' that knows) or nucleus of knowing-ness, the citta is not free. This nucleus is the 'Ultimate Danger' because of its alluring radiance that causes attachment.The nucleus of a Know-er within the citta, by extension, also makes the citta the Ultimate Danger because it is still not free of all defilements. The Ultimate Danger disguises itself as the Ultimate Virtue. The nucleus within the citta has many aspects, all of which are subject to being known and therefore subject to change. Upon being known, the known aspect of the nucleus ceases and another takes its place. When the perception of anatta (not-self) is applied to this nucleus, the agitated citta becomes calm and impassive with no interest in either atta (self) or anatta (not-self). At this moment, the perception of anatta causes the nucleus of the Know-er and knowing to 'flip over', and upon being let go it is totally destroyed, along with the ignorance that causes beings to wander in samsara.

This citta, which is intrinsically bright, clear, and aware, gets superficially tangled up in samsara but ultimately cannot be destroyed by any samsaric phenomenon. Although Bua is often at pains to emphasise the need for meditation upon the non-Self (anatta), he also points out that the citta, while getting caught up in the vortex of conditioned phenomena, is not subject to destruction as are those things which are impermanent, suffering, and non-Self (anicca, dukkha, anatta). The citta is ultimately not beholden to these laws of conditioned existence. The citta is bright, radiant, and deathless, and is its own independent reality.

The fundamental problem that besets human beings, according to Bua, is that they have taken fake and false things as their true self and lack the necessary power to be their 'own true self'; they allow the wiles and deceits of the mental defilements to generate fear and anxiety in their minds. Fear and anxiety are not inherent within the citta; in fact, the citta is ultimately beyond all such things and indeed is beyond time and space. But it needs to be cleansed of its inner defilements (the kilesas) before that truth can be realised.

Bua goes on to attempt to describe the inner stages and experience of the cleansed citta. When its purgation of defilements is complete, it itself does not disappear – only the impermanent, suffering, and the non-Self disappear. The citta remains, experientially abiding in its own firm foundation, yet ultimately indescribable.

Some of the notions found here are reminiscent of the Tathagatagarbha tradition found in Mahayana Buddhism— although the latter posits an original, primordial purity to the mind, whereas Bua sees that purity as needing to be established through mental and moral cultivation.

== Kammatthana ==
Kammatthana literally means "basis of work" or "place of work". It describes the contemplation of certain meditation themes used by a meditating monk so the forces of defilement (kilesa), craving (tanha), and ignorance (avijja) may be uprooted from the mind. Although kammatthana can be found in many meditation-related subjects, the term is most often used to identify the forest tradition (the Kammatthana tradition) lineage founded by Ajahn Sao Kantasilo Mahathera and his student Ajahn Mun Bhuridatta Mahathera.

== Important Disciples ==
- Luang Pu La Khempatto, Wat Banphotkiri (Wat Phu Chok Ko), Nong Sung Tai Subdistrict, Khamcha-i District, Mukdahan Province
- Phra Thepwisutthimongkhon, Phra Ajahn Sri Mahawiro, Wat Prachakomwanaram, Si Somdet District, Roi Et Province
- Luang Pu Bunmee Paripunno Wat Pa Silaporn, Sing Subdistrict, Mueang Yasothon District, Yasothon Province
- Luang Pu Lee Kusontharo Wat Kesornsilkunnatham Chedi (Wat Phu Pha Daeng), Nong O Subdistrict, Nong Wua So District, Udon Thani Province
- Phra Khru Suwimol Bunyakorn Luang Pu Boonpin Katapunyo, Wat Pha Thep Nimit, Nam Un District, Sakon Nakhon Province
- Luang Pu Khamtan Thitthammo Wat Pa Dan Si Samran, Phon Charoen District, Bueng Kan Province
- Luang Pu Phian Wiriyo Wat Pa Nong Kong, Ban Phue District, Udon Thani Province
- Luang Pu Boonpeng Khemaphiro, Wat Tham Klong Pleo, Mueang District, Nong Bua Lamphu Province (Wat Pa Nong Phue, Sakon Nakhon Province / Wat Pa Huai Sai, Mukdahan Province)
- Phra Ajahn Singhthong Thammavaro Wat Pa Kaew Chumphon, Ban Chum Subdistrict, Sawang Daen Din District, Sakon Nakhon Province
- Phra Ajahn Suphat Sukkamo, Wat Pa Prasitthitham A. Sawang Daen Din, Sakon Nakhon Province
- Luang Pu Pang Paripunno Wat Prasitthitham, Ban Dong Yen, Dong Yen Subdistrict, Ban Dung District, Udon Thani Province
- Luang Pu Panya Panyawattho Wat Pa Ban Tad, Ban Tad Subdistrict, Mueang District, Udon Thani Province
- Phra Phutthisarathera, Phra Ajahn Boonku Anuwattano, Wat Ashokaram, Mueang District, Samut Prakan Province
- Phra Khru Phawana Panyasophon, Phra Ajahn Kham Phiw Suphano, Wat Pa Si Wilai, Nong Han District, Udon Thani Province
- Phra Khru Santi Wiranyan (Fak Santithammo) Wat Phichai Phatthana Ram (Khao Noi Sam Phan) Tambon Song Phi Nong, Amphoe Tha Mai, Chanthaburi Province
- Luang Pu Unla Thitthammo, Wat Pa Kaew Chumphon, Ban Chumphon, Tambon Kho Tai, Amphoe Sawang Daen Din, Sakon Nakhon Province
- Phra Ajarn Chan Rian Khunwaro, Wat Tham Sahai Chanthranimit, Amphoe Nong Saeng, Udon Thani Province
- Phra Ajarn Inthawai Santussako Wat Pa Nakham Noi, Amphoe Na Yung, Udon Thani Province
- Phra Khru Wimon Phawanakun, Phra Ajarn Khun Sumeth, Wat Pa Phu Thong, Amphoe Ban Phue, Udon Thani Province
- Phra Bodhiyanmuni Phra Ajarn Muang Phonlawat, Wat Pa Majjhimawas, Mueang District, Kalasin Province
- Phra Ajarn Som Khantiko, Wat Pa Pho Chaiyanasampanno, Non Sa-at District, Udon Thani Province
- Phra Ajarn Cherry Apichetto, Wat Pa Ban Tad, Mueang District, Udon Thani Province
- Phra Ajarn Sudjai Tantamano Wat Pa Ban Tad, Ban Tad Subdistrict, Mueang District, Udon Thani Province
- Phra Ajarn Mana Thewathammo, Wat Tham Wiman Chia, Tha Khantho District, Kalasin Province (Wat Pa Luang Ta Maha Bua, Darwin City, Australia)
- Phra Chulanayok (Suchart Apichato) Wat Yansangwararam Worawihan, Bang Lamung District Chonburi Province
- Phra Wisutthisanthera (Phusit Khantithon) Wat Pa Luang Ta Bua Yanasampanno, Village No. 5, Ban Phu Mai Daeng, Sing Subdistrict, Sai Yok District, Kanchanaburi Province
- Phra Ajahn Wanchai Wichitto Wat Pa Phu Sangkho, Nong Wua So District, Udon Thani Province
- Phra Ajahn Sutham Suthammo, Wat Pa Nong Phai, Mueang District, Sakon Nakhon Province
- Phra Khru Panya Warachan, Phra Ajahn Boonthan Thitasiro, Wat Pa Pa Khao Yai Charoentham, Bueng Sam Phan District, Phetchabun Province
- Phra Khru Wisan Sathanakit Phra Ajarn Sanit Chirasinitho, Wat Pa Kiri Khet, Kaeng Hang Maeo District, Chanthaburi Province
- Phra Ajarn Chirawat Attarakho, Wat Pa Chai Chumphon, Khao Kho District, Phetchabun Province
- Phra Ajarn Songp Supaphaso, Wat Pa Rangsi Paliwan, Kham Muang District, Kalasin Province
- Phra Ajarn Songp Manassanto, Wat Pa Santi Phuttharam (Khao Daeng Yai), Photharam District, Ratchaburi Province
- Phra Ajarn Songp Kussalajitto, Wat Pa Sukjai, Samut Prakan Province
- Phra Ajarn Sunthorn Thittiko, Wat Pa Luang Ta Maha Bua Tham Chedi (Phu Hin Roi Kon Forest Monastery), Nong Saeng District, Udon Thani Province
- Phra Ajarn Montchit Kasem (Chalerm) Thammatharo, Phu Paek Yanasampanno Forest Monastery, Wang Saphung District, Loei Province
- Phra Ajarn Chit Thitajitto, Dong Khlo Yanasampanno Forest Monastery, Nam Nao District, Phetchabun Province
- Phra Ajarn Sopha Samano, Saeng Tham Wang Khao Khieo Temple, Wang Nam Khieo District, Nakhon Ratchasima Province
- Phra Ajarn Sompop Aphiwanno (Piw), Trapsuan Phlu Monastery, Kaeng Khoi District, Saraburi Province
- Phra Wisutthisanthera (Phusit Khanthitharo) or Luang Ta Chan, Luang Ta Bua Yanasampanno Forest Monastery "Tiger Temple", Kanchanaburi Province
- Phra Ajarn Thirayut Thirayutthano, Luang Pho Noi, Saitharkiri Phrik Chelomsuk Temple, Si Sawat District, Kanchanaburi ProvinceKapeng Nong Khai Province
