= Bhante =

Respectful title to address a Buddhist monk or nun

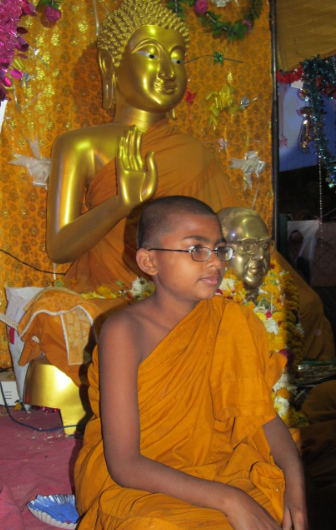
Young Indian Buddhist monk with statues of the Buddha and B. R. Ambedkar in Indian vihara or monastery

Bhante (Pali; Burmese: ဘန္တေ, pronounced [bàɰ̃tè]; Sanskrit: bhavantaḥ), sometimes also Bhadante, is a respectful title used to address Buddhist monks and superiors, especially in the Therāvada tradition. In English, the term is often translated as Venerable.

== Etymology ==
Bhante is a term used to address monks; the corresponding term to address nuns is ayye. The term bhante is a shortened form of the vocative bhadante (with elision of the da), which confers recognition of respect. The Nepali terms bare and bande have the same derivation and are used to address Buddhist clergy. Bhante can be used as a form of address to specific Buddhist monks, similar to Ajahn, Phra or Luang Por in Thailand or Ashin in Burma (now Myanmar), Rinpoche in Tibet. However, a significant difference compared to these other terms is that grammatically speaking "bhante" is in the vocative case. The vocative case denotes and is used for address. Bhikkhu Bodhi explains that the “vocative is used to address someone.” For example, the Buddha “addresses the monks with bhikkhave. The monks address the Buddha with the vocative bhante.” Said simply, a vocative is the form used when speaking to a person, not when speaking about a person. For this reason, the use of bhante as an honorific or even as a proper name is strictly speaking grammatically incorrect.

A grammatically incorrect usage of bhante appears to be an element of Buddhist modernism, where the term has come to function as an English honorific. It is possible that the development leading to this usage had its starting point in an Indian and Sri Lankan usage of -ji to epress endearment. When addressing a teacher, a guru, this takes the form guruji, and when addressing a monk the corresponding form is bhanteji. An Americanization of bhanteji has led to the form "bhante G," as a way of referring to the eminent Sri Lankan monk Gunaratana Mahāthera. Although this usage satisfies a penchant for shortening long names, note that at this stage the vocative function is lost, as "Bhante G" functions now as a proper name. With that precedent established, others have followed suit, an example being the usage of Bhante Sujato. This usage combines the vocative bhante with a proper name that is instead in the nominative case. Although the exact form of the above suggested development can no longer be verified, the resultant combination of a vocative and a nominative in what is a single referent can safely be considered to lack a precedent in traditional Pali literature, simply because of its grammatical lack of coherence.

== In literature ==
The title bhante is used among monks to address superiors within the sangha. The discourses in the Pali Canon report the Buddha's disciples addressing even non-Buddhists in this way. An example is the householder Citta in conversation with the leader of the Jains (SN 41.8). The same form of address can also be used between laity, an example being when the householder Sirivaddha is addressed in this way by his servant (SN 47.29). While the Buddha is at times addressed with the term bhadante, his disciples usually address him as bhante. According to the Mahāparinibbāna Sutta, the custom of using bhante to address senior monks as well was instituted by the Buddha just before his final Nirvana (DN 16:6.2). The implication is that the shift from using the term āvuso to address not only juniors but also seniors monks to employing instead bhante for the latter occurred after the Buddha had passed away.

== See also ==
- Ayya
- Ajahn
- Anjali
- Awgatha
- Phra
- Sayadaw
