= Ajahn =

Thai-language Buddhist term that translates as teacher

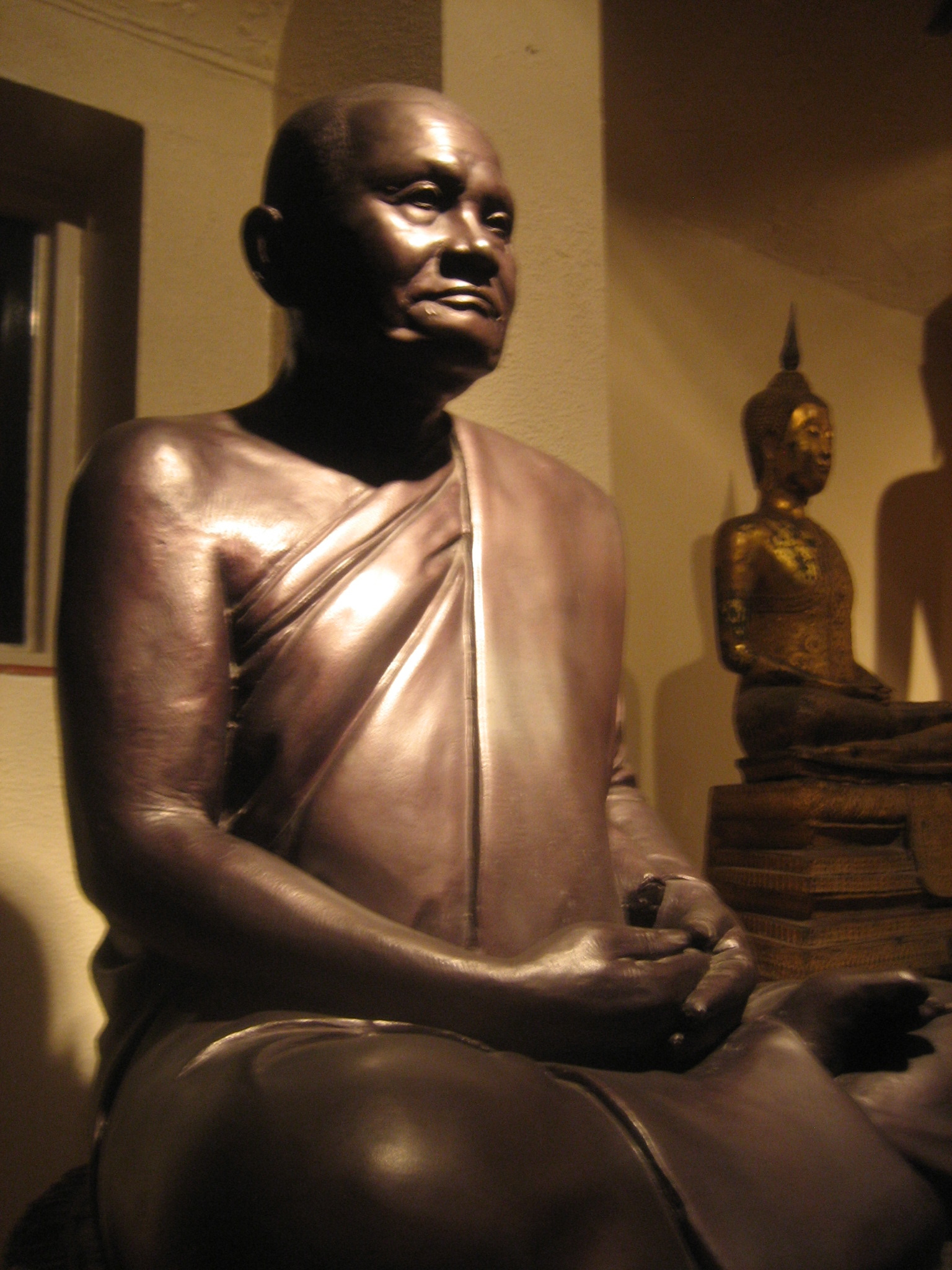
Ajahn Chah, Buddhist monk

Ajahn (Thai: อาจารย์, RTGS: achan, IPA: [ʔāː.tɕāːn]; Lao: ອາຈານ, romanized: ācān) is a Thai- and Lao-derived term that translates as "professor" or "teacher". The term is in turn derived from the Pali word ācariya and is a term of respect, similar in meaning to the Japanese sensei. It is used as a title of address for high school and university teachers, and for Buddhist monks who have passed ten vassa – in other words those who have maintained their monastic precepts unbroken for a period of ten years. The term Luang Por, "Venerable father", signifies an ajahn of acknowledged seniority in Thai Buddhism.

== Buddhism ==
According to the Vinaya, any properly ordained monk can become an ācariya after ten vassa in the robes, thus a Thai monk becomes ajahn.

A senior monk may bear the honorific title phra ajahn (Thai: พระอาจารย์,"venerable monk"), or in more informal situations, than ajahn (Thai: ท่านอาจารย์,"venerable monk").

Some famous ajahns are:

- Ajahn Amaro
- Ajahn Maha Boowa
- Ajahn Brahm
- Ajahn Chah
- Ajahn Jayasāro
- Ajahn Khemadhammo
- Ajahn Lee
- Ajahn Mun
- Ajahn Pasanno
- Ajahn Sao Kantasilo
- Ajahn Sobin S. Namto
- Ajahn Sucitto
- Ajahn Sumedho
- Ajahn Suwat Suvaco
- Ajahn Thate
- Ajahn Tong
- Ajahn Geoff

In Thai, such highly esteemed monks would rarely be called simply ajahn chah, ajahn mun, etc., as there are much more respectful ways for addressing or referring to them.

The term "Ajahn" is generally not formal enough to be used without the prefix "Pra" or "Tan" for monks when addressed by the laity, but this formality has been loosened when it comes to Western monks and Theravada monks well known outside Thailand.

== See also ==
- Thera
- Achar
- Bhante
- Luang Por
- Sayadaw
