= Wat Aranyawiwake =

Theravadin Buddhist monastery in Chiang Mai, Thailand

Wat Aranyawiwake Buddhist Monastery
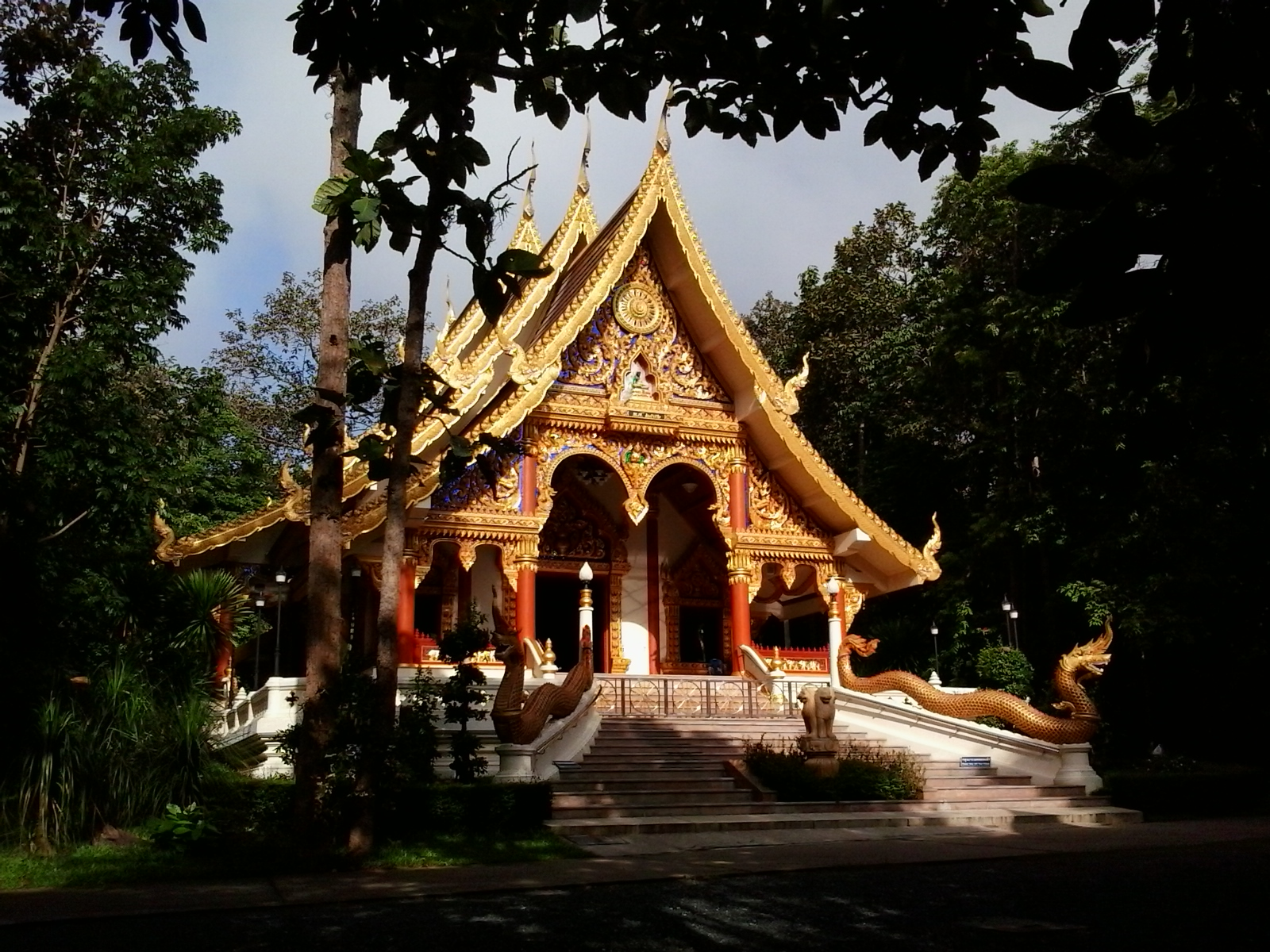

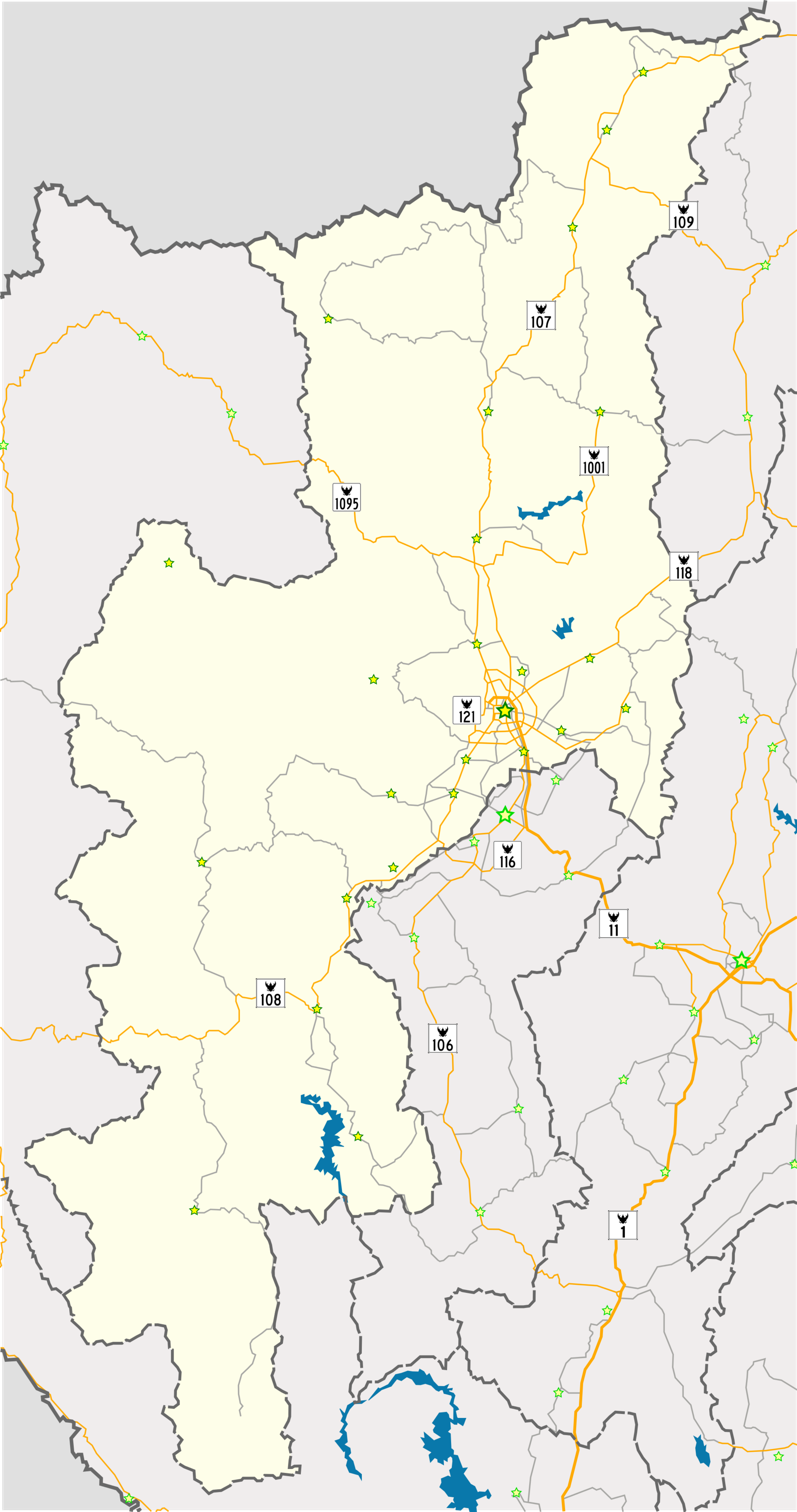
- Location within Chiang Mai Province Location within Thailand

Religion
- Affiliation: Thai Forest Tradition

Location
- Location: Wat Aranyawiwake (Baan Pong), Intakhil, Mae Taeng, Chiang Mai 50150, Thailand
- Country: Thailand
- Interactive map of Wat Aranyawiwake Buddhist Monastery
- Coordinates: 19.1376°N 98.9841°E

Architecture
- Founder: Luang Por Mun Bhuridatta

Website
- www.aranyawiwake.com/indexeng.html%20Aranyawiwake.com

Wat Aranyawiwake (Thai script: วัดอรัญญวิเวก, RTGS: Wat Aranyawiwek) is a monastery (wat) in the Thai Forest Tradition of the Theravada lineage of Buddhism. It is in Mae Taeng, Chiang Mai Province, northern Thailand. Phra Ajahn Plien Panyapatipo is the current abbot of Wat Aranyawiwake, where he has resided since 1966. Wat Aranyawiwake was established and named by Luang Pho Mun Bhuridatta, the "father" of the current tradition of forest meditation monastics.

== The monastery ==
Wat Aranyawiwake was originally an old monastic residence, established by a group of people from various families in Intakhin Sub-district, Mae Taeng District, Chiang Mai Province. They had deep interest and faith in Buddhism.

They invited virtuous monks, who were meditation masters, to reside in the village in order for them to receive the teaching of the Buddha. Later on, they heard of a monk who practiced meditation and stopped by a wat in Mae Taeng District, so they invited the Venerable Ajahn Mun Bhuridatta. Ajahn Mun accepted the invitation and gathered a group of disciples, to seek an appropriate place for practice of meditation. They searched for four days and Ajahn Mun found this place.

At the end of the rain retreat, Ajahn Mun and his disciples left the place to continue their austere practice. Ajahn Mun told his followers, who attended him in Ban Pong, that he had named this place "Aranyawiwake monastic residence".

== See also ==
- Thai Forest Tradition
- Ajahn Mun Bhuridatta
- Luang Por Waen Sujinno
- Rain retreat
