= Ajahn Analayo =

Thai Theravāda Buddhist monk (1888–1983)

Luang Pu Khao Analayo
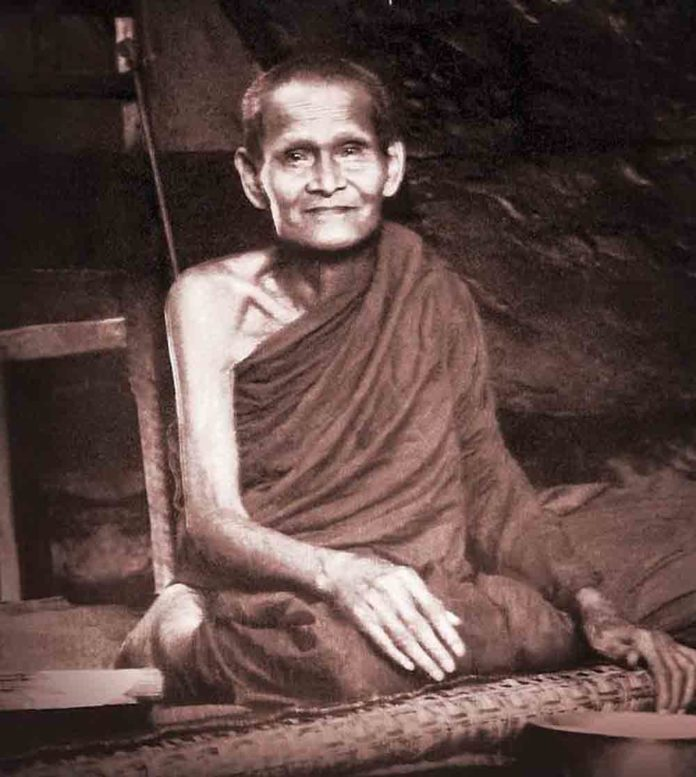
- Luang Pu Khao Analayo
- Title: Phra Khao Analayo (พระขาว อนาลโย)

Personal life
- Born: Khao Koratha; 28 December 1888 Ban Bo Chaneng, Amnat Charoen Province, Siam
- Died: 16 May 1983 (aged 94) Wat Tham Klong Phen, Nong Bua Lamphu Province, Thailand
- Other name: หลวงปู่ขาว อนาลโย
- Occupation: Buddhist monk

Religious life
- Religion: Buddhism
- School: Theravāda
- Lineage: Dhammayuttika Nikaya
- Dharma name: Analayo (อนาลโย)

Senior posting
- Based in: Wat Tham Klong Phen, Nong Bua Lamphu

Luang Pu Khao Analayo (หลวงปู่ขาว อนาลโย; 28 December 1888 – 16 May 1983) was a Thai Theravāda Buddhist monk of the Dhammayuttika Nikaya in the Thai Forest Tradition. He was widely respected as a meditation master in the vipassanā tradition, and a close disciple of Ajahn Mun.

== Early life ==
Luang Pu Khao Analayo was born under the name Khao Koratha on December 28, 1888 in Ban Bo Chaneng, Nong Kaeo Subdistrict, Amnat Charoen District, Ubon Ratchathani Province (today part of Amnat Charoen Province). His parents were Phua and Rod Koratha. He was the fourth of seven children in the family, who were rice farmers.

At age 20, in 1909, he married Mee Koratha and had seven children. However, after catching his wife cheating on him, he decided to ordain as a Buddhist monk, finally doing so in 1919 at Wat Bodhi Sri.

== Ordination ==
He was first ordained on May 2, 1919 at Wat Bodhi Sri (today known as Wat Bo Chaneng) in Nong Kaeo in the Mahanikaya order. His preceptor was Phra Khru Phutthasak. He stayed at the temple for six years but wasn't satisfied with the conduct of his teachers and his fellow monks, who often neglected their monastic discipline and meditation practice. Because of this, he became a wandering dhutanga monk.

== Monastic life and practice ==
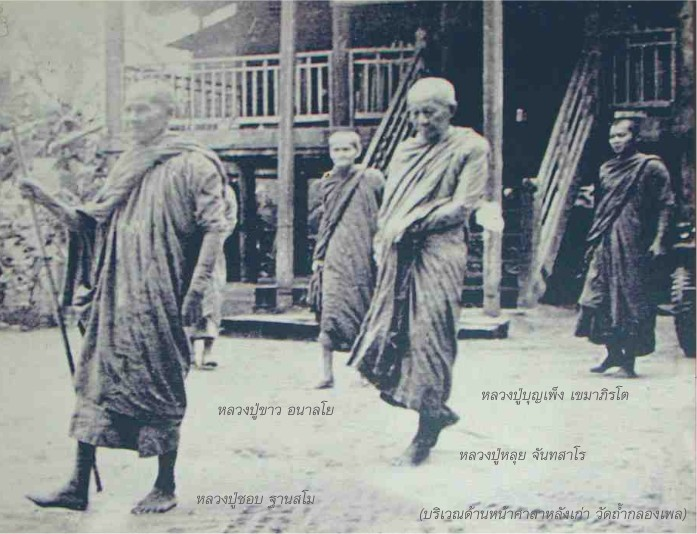
From left: Ven. Ajahn Chob Thanasamo, Ven. Luangpu Khao Analayo, Ven. Luangpu Louis Candasaro and Ven. Luang Pu Bunpeng Khemabhirato. The picture was probably taken at old main sala of Wat Pa Nongphue Na Nai in Sakol Nakhon.

After joining the Dhammayuttika order, he spent eight rains retreats in Udon Thani, then went wandering on dhutanga pilgrimage with Ajahn Mun, practicing in forests and mountains throughout Thailand. He also practiced alongside other eminent disciples of Ajahn Mun such as Ajahn Fan Acharo, Ajahn Waen Suchinno, Ajahn Thate Desaransi, and Ajahn Chob Thanasamo.

Analayo spent many years living in the forests of Thailand, where he lived in a hut and meditated under a klot, a large umbrella with a mosquito net. Biographical accounts mention mystical experiences with wild animals such as elephants and tigers while he was meditating.

In 1958, he settled permanently at Wat Thum Klong Pain in Nong Bua Lamphu, where he remained until his death.

== Death ==
Luang Pu Khao died on 16 May 1983 at the age of 94. King Bhumibol Adulyadej, who had previously discussed Buddhism with Luang Pu Khao, sponsored his funeral rites. A royal cremation was held on 11 February 1984, presided over by King Bhumibol along with Queen Sirikit and Princess Maha Chakri Sirindhorn. Tens of thousands of devotees attended, making it one of the largest monastic funerals in modern Thai history.

In 1989, the King and Queen presided over a ceremony to raise a stupa containing Khao Analayo's relics.

== Teachings ==
Luang Pu Khao emphasized strict morality, diligent meditation, and insight into impermanence. A well-known excerpt of his teaching states:

- "People are born different because of different conduct. Good deeds, generosity, and virtue bring wisdom and favorable conditions. All actions bring results, whether wholesome or unwholesome. Thus, we should make merit, keep pure morality, and cultivate meditation to bring calm and clarity of mind..."

He often taught meditation with the mantra "Buddho, Buddho" to anchor the mind and prevent distraction.

== Legacy ==
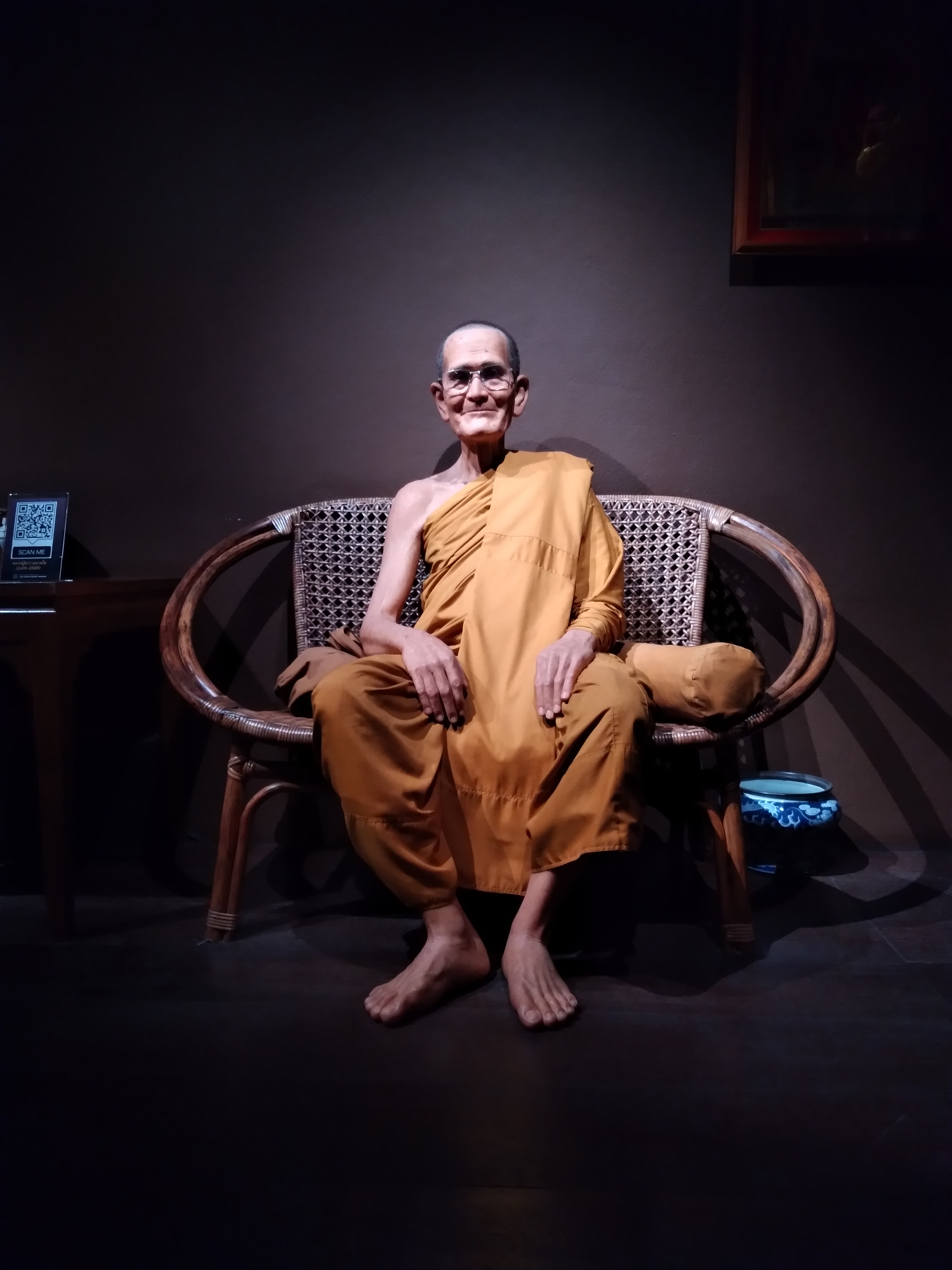
Wax figure of Luang Pu Khao Analayo at the Thai Human Imagery Museum, Nakhon Pathom

Wat Tham Klong Phen became his principal legacy, preserved as a forest monastery with a museum of his relics and personal effects. His disciples continued to spread his teachings throughout Thailand and abroad.

== Notable disciples ==
- Somdet Phra Nyanasamvara (Charoen Suvaddhano), later Supreme Patriarch of Thailand
- Ajahn Chuan Kulachettho, Wat Phu Tok, Bueng Kan
- Ajahn Chia Chunno, Wat Pa Phurithat, Pathum Thani
- Ajahn Chanda Thawaro, Wat Pa Khao Noi, Phichit
