= Ajahn Thate =

Buddhist monk of Thai Forest Tradition (1902–1994)

Phra Rajanirodharangsi Gambhirapanyavisiddhi (Thet Desarangsi)
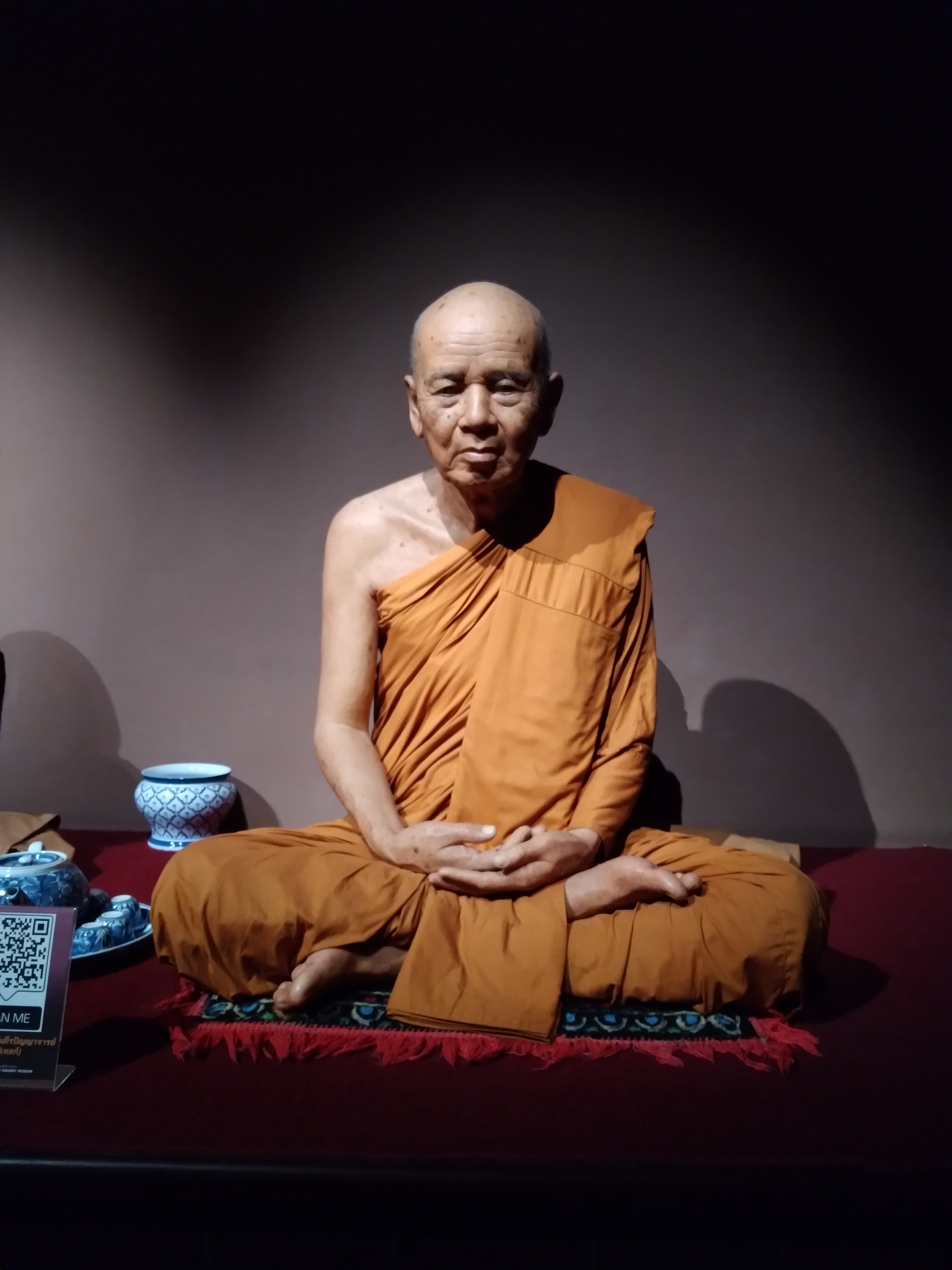
- Title: Than Ajahn

Personal life
- Born: Thet; 26 April 1902 Baan Nah Seedah, Tambon Klang Yai, Amphoe Ban Phue, Udon Thani Province
- Died: 17 December 1994 (aged 92) Wat Hin Maak Peng, Amphoe Si Chiang Mai, Nong Khai Province
- Other names: Luangpu Thet Thetrangsi; Venerable Ajahn Thate
- Occupation: Abbot

Religious life
- Religion: Buddhism
- School: Theravada, Dhammayuttika Nikaya
- Lineage: Thai Forest Tradition
- Dharma names: Desarangsi

Senior posting
- Teacher: Venerable Ajahn Mun Bhuridatta Mahathera
- Based in: Wat Hin Maak Peng
- Predecessor: Venerable Ajahn Mun Bhuridatta Mahathera
- Successor: Venerable Ajahn Maha Bua

Phra Ajahn Thate Desaransi (1902–1994), also known as Ajahn Tate, Luangpu Thet Thetrangsi, Phra Desarangsee, or by his monastic title Phra Rajanirodharangsee, was a famous meditation master and Buddhist monk from northern Thailand. He was a disciple of Ajahn Mun and thus a first generation student of the Thai Forest Tradition and one of the founding teachers of the lineage. Following the death of Ajahn Mun in 1949, he was considered to be the Ajahn Yai, or the head of the Thai Forest Tradition lineage until his death in 1994.

== Background ==
Ajahn Thate was born into the family of Ree-o rahng on 26 April 1902 (in the Buddhist calendar the fourth day of the waning moon in the year of the tiger). His birthplace was the village of Nah Seedah, in the subdistrict of Glahng Yai, Bahn Peur District, Udorn-thani Province. His father's first name was Usah, and his mother's Krang. They were rice-farmers and both had grown up as fatherless orphans. Thate was one of ten children. Ajahn Thate was a disciple of the very respected Forest Monk teachers Ajahn Sao and Ajahn Mun Bhuridatta. One of his fellow disciples at that time was Ajahn Chah. Another fellow disciple who remained a lifelong friend was Ajahn Maha Bua.
Living and meditating in isolated caves and forests, Ajahn Thate began to obtain acute insights into the workings of the mind.

"I directed mindfulness so that it was keeping closely aware of the mind, following it to know what happens at death. Mindfulness stayed with the heart right up to the final moment when only the barest awareness remained. A feeling was present that to release that faint degree of awareness would be death. At this point, the question became whether it would be better for me to let go and allow death to take place. I felt that my heart was currently quite pure and that if I were to let go, I wouldn't lose because of it. Although there also remained a delicate feeling that expressed the thought that: 'rather than letting go and die, by remaining alive, I could continue to be of benefit to other people. If it were all to finish here with my death, then it could only be to my own purely personal advantage. Also, people wouldn't know the full circumstances and causes of this death. If that's the case, it's certainly better not to let myself die.' I therefore attempted to wiggle and move my hands and feet, until I came around."

"Sometimes, it even happened that although I was asleep and aware of the fact, I was unable to get up. It took some effort on my part to move the body and by that come back to waking consciousness again. My own understanding at that time was that the stilled, one-pointed heart, didn't allow thoughts to careen away externally and so would definitely be able to transcend every bit of suffering. I thought that wisdom's only function was to purge the out-wanderings of the heart and return it to a state of stillness."

Ajahn Thate came to dwell and meditate in the forest near what is now Wat Hin Makpeng in 1964. There, as well as constructing kutis (or sleeping quarters) and temples for the monks, he assisted with funding local schools, hospitals and sewerage treatment works.

The Ajahn Thate became widely renowned for his humility and the development of his consciousness through Buddhist meditation not just through all sections of society in Thailand but internationally, particularly as a result of international speaking and meditation practise tours to Singapore, Indonesia and Australia. In addition to his large following of disciples in Thailand, Ajaan Thate trained many western disciples in meditation. He wrote a profound short book on the practise of meditation.

On 26 May 1982 The Supreme Patriarch of Buddhism in Thailand (the late Somdet Phra Vaasana Mahaathera) came to officiate at the ceremonial opening of the a Mondop building there and officially declared Wat Hin Mark Peng to be a 'Model Monastery' and gave the Ajahn Thate official recognition of his high status in Buddhism in Thailand.

== Buddhist Life at Wat Hin Maak Peng ==
Wat Hin Maak Peng is located at Ban Thai Charoen, Tambon Phra Phutthabat near Nong Khai. Wat Hin Maak Peng borders the Mekong River. The temple compound (sala) is spacious, clean and shady with various species of plants growing around the marble floor and tiled columns. On one side is a mural depicting a multi-headed snake (Nāga) protecting the Buddha while he is in meditation. Nearby are small wooden kutirs occupied by the monks. During the time of Ajahn Thate, a gong would sound well before dawn to signal the time when the monks would begin their practise of prolonged concentration of the mind on a single point. Around dawn, the monks would file out with their bowls to receive food from the villagers. This was taken back to the temple to be consumed as their only meal of the day. The rest of the day was spent sweeping the paths, studying scriptures or in spiritual discussion with Ajahn Thate. A cup of sugared tea was available at lunch and in the afternoon. Chanting took place in the temple after dark and before sleep meditation was again practised.

== Funeral of Ajahn Thate ==
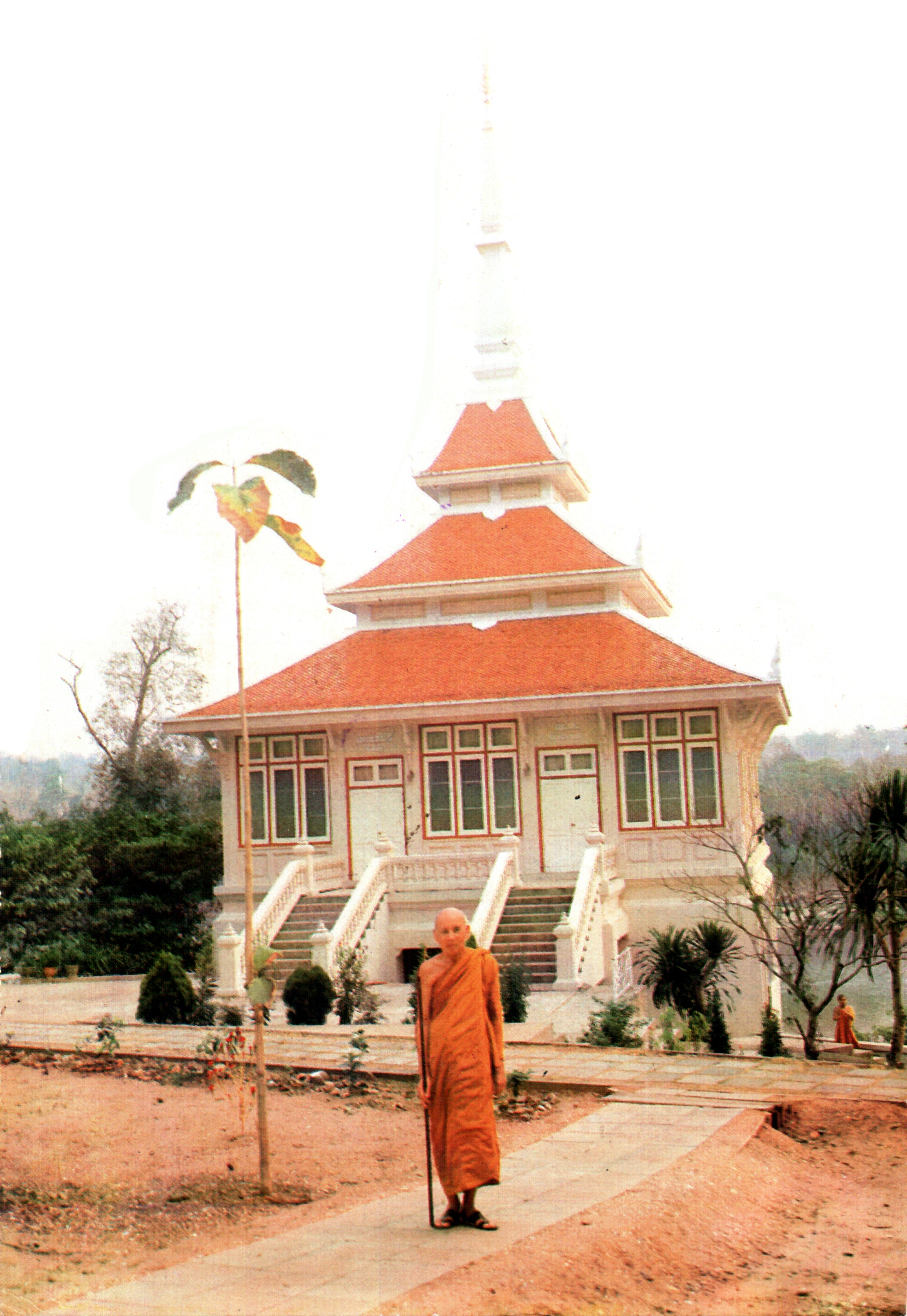
Ajahn Thate at Wat Hin Maak Peng, c.1991.

The cremation of Venerable Ajahn Thate took place on 8 January 1996, a day of bright sunshine. People from all over Thailand — led by HM the King Bhumibol Adulyadej and the royal family — came to pay their final respects. Each region where the Venerable Ajahn had stayed was represented — even from overseas. It is estimated that there were ten thousand monks present and many hundreds of thousands of lay people. The temporary car park was filled with up to thirty thousand vehicles, including many small and large buses from all parts of Thailand. There were free food stalls and refreshments. A half a million memorial books of the Venerable Ajahn Thate's teachings were distributed free to those present.

When all was ready, HM the King flew in by helicopter officially to lead the making of offerings and light the cremation fire. The monks followed this, filing past the coffin, then the dignitaries with all the ordinary people who had supported Venerable Ajahn Thate for more than seventy years as a monk.

The actual cremation took place later that night with a full moon shining down on the crematorium (with traditional Thai tiered-roofs), lake and fountain, specially built for the occasion. These remain as a landmark and memorial to Venerable Ajahn Thate when devotees come to practice Dhamma and remember his example.

The next morning, when the fire was cooled, the bones and ashes of Venerable Ajahn Thate were reverently removed and safeguarded as relics. Inside the temple, there is a statue of Luangpu Thet on display with the eight requisites (the three robes, the bowl, a razor, a needle, the girdle and a water-strainer) and his biography.

== Basic Teachings ==
Thate's basic teaching was that evolution of the human mind required a commitment to the Noble Eightfold Path and the three teachings at the heart of Buddhism — the avoidance of all evil, the perfection of skillfulness, and a purification of the heart. These virtues have to be established first by constant application of the principles of morality in the face of obstacles. This is an approach resembling virtue ethics, but with the endpoint being not just the development of virtues per se, but virtues in order to provide the foundation for stillness and then concentration of the mind. As Thate puts it in his classic small text of meditation Steps Along the Path:

"This is why, for the Buddha's teachings, morality forms the beginning of the religious life. The next step is to train the mind to develop concentration (samadhi) and absorption (jhana) through the practice of tranquillity meditation. Once the mind is adept at maintaining a steady focus, we can then develop clear insight (vipassana)."

"While you are training the mind, one thing — strange and striking — may occur without you intending it. That is, the mind will withdraw from its external objects and gather into a single whole, letting go of all labels and attachments dealing with past or future. There will be just bare awareness paired with its preoccupation in the present. This is something with no sense of "inside" or "outside" — a condition whose features are peculiar to the mind itself. It is as if everything has undergone a revolution."

"The visions and signs that arise from the practice of meditation are a strange and uncanny affair. They may delude a gullible person of weak judgment into being so convinced of their truth as to lose touch with reality. For this reason, those who practice meditation should be cautious, examining and reflecting on them carefully."

"Fixed penetration is a superior human attainment. By and large, people who reach fixed penetration tend to focus on the in-and-out breath (anapana) as their object of meditation. As they focus on the breath and come to pay attention to its arising and falling away, or just to its falling away, the mind gradually becomes more and more refined until, step by step, it lets go of all its preoccupations and gathers together."

In his text Buddho Ajahn Thate describes what it is like when the mind has finally rid itself of preoccupation with sensual distractions and is able to focus on the breath, mantra, or a part of the body, in meditation: "When you first enter concentration, this is what it's like: You'll have no idea at all of what concentration or one-pointedness of mind is going to feel like. You are simply intent on keeping mindfulness firmly focused on one object – and the power of a mind focused firmly on one object is what will bring you to a state of concentration. You won't be thinking at all that concentration will be like this or like that, or that you want it to be like this or like that. It will simply take its own way, automatically. No one can force it. At that moment you will feel as if you are in another world (the world of the mind), with a sense of ease and solitude to which nothing else in the world can compare. When the mind withdraws from concentration, you will regret that that mood has passed, and you will remember it clearly. All that we say about concentration comes from the mind which has withdrawn from that state. As long as it is still gathered in that state, we aren't interested in what anyone else says or does. You have to train the mind to enter this sort of concentration often, so as to become skilled and adept, but don't try to remember your past states of concentration, and don't let yourself want your concentration to be like it was before – because it won't be that way, and you will just be making more trouble for yourself."

== Influence ==
The influence of Ajahn Thate can be seen in Buddhist centres outside Thailand that revere the Thai Forest Tradition such as those in the United States (Thanissaro Bhikkhu Metta Forest Monastery, and the community of Abhayagiri), Australia (Ajahn Brahm, Bodhinyana Monastery, Bodhivana Monastery), United Kingdom (Amaravati Buddhist Monastery and Chithurst Buddhist Monastery) and Italy with the monastery of Santacittarama.

== Important Disciples ==
- Phra Udomyanamoli (Chan Sri Chantadeepho) Wat Phothisombhorn Udon Thani Province
- Phra Suthamkhanachan (Rian Woralo) Wat Aranyabanphot Nong Khai Province
- Phra Udomsangwonwisutthithera (Phra Ajahn Wan Uttamo) Wat Tham Aphai Damrongtham Sakon Nakhon Province
- Luang Pu Buapa Panyaphaso Wat Pa Phra Sathit Nong Khai Province
- Phra Khru Wirot Thammacharn (Pin Chalito) Wat Ariyawongsaram Ratchaburi Province
- Phra Khru Yananuyoke (Phra Ajahn Kant Chansaro) Wat Prachasanti Phang Nga Province
- Phra Phothidhammacharn Thera (Suwat Suwajo) Wat Pa Khao Noi Buriram Province
- Phra Khru Suwannopamkhun (Kham Phong Tisso) Wat Tham Kok Du Udon Thani Province
- Phra Ratchasangwonyan (Phut Thaniyo) Wat Pa Salawan Nakhon Ratchasima Province
- Phra Khru Phawanapanyadilok (Chiem Panyapalo) Wat Sramongkhon Nakhon Pathom Province
- Luang Pu La Khempatto Wat Banphotkiri (Phu Chok Ko) Mukdahan Province
- Luang Pu Net Chirapunyo Wat Mahathat Laem Sak, Ao Luek District Krabi Province
- Phra Ajahn Mau Thammattamo
- Phra Sophonkunatharn (Phra Ajahn Maha Niem Suwajo) Wat Charoen Samanakit (behind the court) Phuket Province
- Phra Khru Khemkhunsophon (Phra Ajahn Chanram Khemsiri) Wat Ko Kaew Thudongkasathan Buriram Province
- Luang Pu Chan Som Kittikaro Wat Chantrangsi (Na Sida) Udon Thani Province
- Phra Ajahn Poon Chittadhammo
- Phra Ajahn Arun (Hang) Uttamo Wat Phra Bat Nasing, So Phisai District Nong Khai Province
- Phra Ajahn Rinthong (Linthong) Kittisatto Wat Phutthikaram Songkhla Province
- Phra Ajahn Kham Bo Thitapanyo Wat Mai Ban Tan Sakon Nakhon Province
- Phra Sutthisanmuni (Phra Ajahn Boonrak Thitapunyo) Wat Samranniwet Amnat Charoen Province
- Phra Ajahn Prasarn Sumano Wat Pa Nong Krai Yasothon Province
- Phra Thep Mongkhon Yan (Santi Analayo) Wat Phutthabucha Bangkok
- Phra Ajarn Ian Thitawiriyo, Wat Pa Kok Mon Surin Province
- Phra Ajarn Plian Panyapatipo Wat Aranyawiwek Chiang Mai Province
- Luang Pho Pramote Pamojjo, Wat Suan Santitham Chonburi Province
- Phra Khru Phawana Chitsunthon (Somchit Chittasamvaro), Wat Aranyikawat Udon Thani Province
- Phra Ajarn Uthai Thammavaro, Wat Phuya U Udon Thani Province
- Phra Khru Boonsamothan, Phra Ajarn Ruam Opaso, Wat Pa Nong Na Tho, Pho Chai District Roi Et Province
- Phra Ajarn Uthai (Tik) Chanuttmo, Wat Pa Huai Lat Loei Province
- Phra Ajarn Prasop Worachitto, Wat Pa Phurin Udon Thani Province
- Phra Khru Phisutthithammarangsri, Wat Pa Wang Nam Mok Nong Khai Province
- Phra Khru Thammayansophon, Wat Tham Han Nong Khai Province
- Phra Khru Kowit Sangkhakan (Arakwan Rattanapanno), Wat Pa Chai Charoen Udon Thani Province
- Phra Khru Wisutthakhunrangsri Hin Mak Peng Temple Nong Khai Province
- Phra Ajahn Phichit Chitmaro, Wat Pa Kung Si Kalasin Province
- Luang Pu Boon Ta Pasanjitto, Wat Lumphini Nong Khai Province
- Phra Ajahn Mana Yasawattho, Wat Pa Pong Yang Phatthana Ram Chiang Mai Province
- Phra Ajahn Paiboon Kowilo Hin Mak Peng Temple Nong Khai Province
- Luang Pu Khampai Rakkhittachitto (Attendant Monk) Hin Mak Peng Temple Nong Khai Province
- Phra Khru Phawana Koson Wi. (Chan Thammachayo) Pa Khao Lom Temple Chachoengsao Province
- Mae Chee Phimpa (Noi) Wongsa Udom, Hin Mak Peng Temple Nong Khai Province
