= Ajahn Chanda Thawaro =

Buddhist monk of Thai Forest Tradition (1922–2012)

Phra Chanda Thawaro
- Title: Abbot of Wat Pa Khao Noi

Personal life
- Born: Chanda; February 10, 1922 Baan Dang village, Roi Et Province, Thailand
- Died: February 21, 2012 (aged 90) Baan Noen Haou Lo village, Phichit Province, Thailand
- Education: A third level certificate in Pali Studies
- Other name: Laung-bhu-Chan-da-Tha-wa-ro
- Occupation: Bhikkhu

Religious life
- Religion: Buddhism
- School: Theravada, Dhammayuttika Nikaya
- Lineage: Thai Forest Tradition
- Dharma name: Thavaro

Senior posting
- Teacher: Venerable Ajahn Mun Bhuridatta Mahathera
- Based in: Wat Pa Khao Noi
- Successor: Phra Ajahn Sathien Kantasilo

Military service
- Website: luangphujuntathawaro.com

Phra Chanda Thawaro (Thai: (จันทา ถาวโร)), commonly known as Ajahn Chanda, (Note: The word "Ajahn" (Thai: อาจารย์; RTGS: Achan) means "teacher".) or Laung Pu Chanda Thawaro in Thai, (Thai: พระอาจารย์จันทา,หลวงปู่จันทา ถาวโร), born as Chanda Chainit (Thai: จันทา ไชยนิตย์) (February 10, 1922 – February 21, 2012), was a Thai Buddhist monk. Chanda is one of the best known Thai Buddhist monks of the late 20th and early 21st centuries. He was widely regarded as an Arahant — a living Buddhist saint. He was a disciple of the esteemed forest master Ajahn Mun Bhuridatta, and was himself considered a master in the Thai Forest Tradition.

== Lore Of Luang Pu Chanda Thawaro ==
- Nomad of Dhamma
