= Wat Doi Mae Pang =

Buddhist temple in Chiang Mai province, Thailand

Coordinates: 19°12′45″N 99°11′15″E

Wat Doi Mae Pang (Thai: วัดดอยแม่ปั๋ง) is a Buddhist temple in Phrao district, Chiang Mai Province, northern Thailand. It is some 75 kilometres from the city Chiang Mai on route 1001 towards Phrao.

It was the home of Luang Por Waen Sujinno, a famous and revered monk, from 1962 until his death in 1985. Many of the buildings are of wooden construction, including the viharn and a hermit's cell called Rong Yang Giled or Rong Fai. Relics of Luang Por Waen Sujinno include his dwelling hut, a picture in the pavilion that shows him meditating, and a square-shaped, spire-roofed museum with his ashes, a wax model of the monk, and his person effects.
