= Luang Pu Waen Suciṇṇo =

Buddhist monk of Thai Forest Tradition (1887–1985)

Waen Suciṇṇo
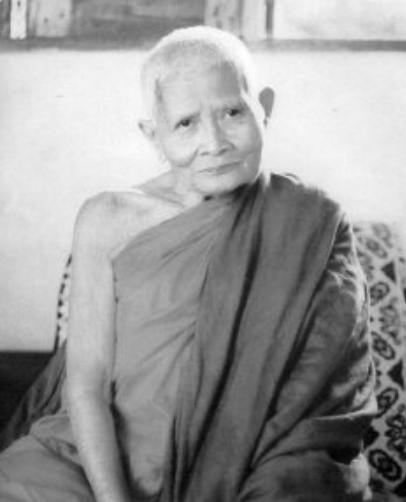

Personal life
- Born: Lok Ta Soung; 16 February 1887 Mueang Loei, Leoi, Thailand
- Died: 2 July 1985 (aged 98) Maharaj Nakorn Chiang Mai Hospital, Chiang Mai province, Thailand
- Occupation: Buddhist monk

Religious life
- Religion: Buddhism
- School: Thai Forest Tradition
- Dharma names: Suciṇṇo

Senior posting
- Teacher: Ven. Mun Bhuridatta

Luang Pu Waen Suciṇṇo (Thai: หลวงปู่แหวน สุจิณโณ; 16 February 1887 – 2 July 1985) was a Buddhist monk in Thailand, and part of the Thai Forest Tradition.

== Early life and ordination ==
He took novice ordination at the age of 9 years old, in 1896, as per the request of his mother and grandmother. He had not received a formal education in his youth, but as a young novice he began studying the mūla-kachai, which is no-longer done in Thailand after Somdet Phra Maha Samana Chao Krom Phraya Vajirañāṇavarorasa changed the curriculum in the early 1900s. While he was still studying, he reached the age required for full ordination and took Bhikkhu ordination at Wat Saang Taw, with Phra Ajahn Waen as his preceptor.

== Meeting Ajahn Mun and later life ==
After his original teachers had all disrobed, he felt the need to go searching for a new teacher, and finally met Ajahn Mun at around 1918. In 1921 he met Tan Chao Khun Upālī Guṇūpamājaan, who was revered by many and well-respected by Ajahn Mun himself. Luang Pu Waen Sucinno reordained as a monk in the Dhammayuttika Nikaya with Tan Chao Khun Upālī Guṇūpamājaa as his preceptor sometime between 1921 and 1931. In 1955, Luang Pu met Phra Ajaan Noo Sucitto, who later invited him to stay at Wat Doi Mae Pang, where Luang Pu was looked after until he died in 1985 due to health complications.

== Exceptional qualities ==
Luang Por Waen has stated, "Anyone who is interested in lay people is only interested in gain." He was not interested in lay people, novices, or nuns. According to him, these interests were only for gain, praise, and fame.

Like Ajahn Mun Bhuridatto, Luang Por Waen's spiritual teacher, he spent his life as a Thudong monk until he became disabled. He lived alone, practiced alone in forests, and preferred seclusion.

== Drunken Dhamma ==
Verbal usage of the Thai word 'Dhammo' as 'Dham-Mo' was a metaphor in his sermons. 'Maw' or 'Mo' is a Thai word which gives the meaning 'Drunken' or 'Intoxicated'. Luang Por Waen referred to the 'Future' and the 'Past' as 'Dham-Mo' which means 'Drunken Dhamma' and he referred to the 'Current Moment' as 'Dhammo' which means Straight Dhamma. "Don't think about future and past. It is Drunken Dhamma" -was his regular advice.

== Popularity ==
Until a royal Thai air-force pilot had spotted him meditating in the sky, Luang Por Waen was a hidden gem in the rural Thailand. Though he didn't like fame, this incident made him the most popular monk of Thailand in that decade. He attracted the Royal Patronage and King Bhumipol became a closer devotee of Luan Por Waen. In the latter period of his life, the abbot of his resident monastery 'Wat Doi Mae Pang' had to limit and control the number of people who came to visit Luang Por Waen.

One day, a doctor had got a rare chance to ask from him about the incident of the air-force pilot. 'Do you think I'm a bird' - was the reply of Luang Por.

== Important Disciples ==
- Somdet Phra Mahawirawong (Manit Thawaro) Wat Sampanthawongsaram Worawihan Bangkok
- Phra Ratcha Udommongkhon (Ae Maung Uttamarambo) Wat Wang Wiwekaram Kanchanaburi Province
- Phra Khru Chittawisothanachan (Phra Ajarn Nu Sujitto) Wat Doi Mae Pang Chiang Mai Province
- Phra Sobhonwisutthikun (Phra Ajarn Boonpeng Kappago) Wat Pa Wiwektham Khon Kaen Province
- Luang Pu Tha Nakwanno Wat Si Sawang Naram Ubon Ratchathani Province
- Luang Pu Kham Pong Khantiko Wat Pa Amphawan Loei Province
- Phra Sila Sangwon (Phra Ajahn Charoen Rahulo) Wat Phra That Khao Noi Ratchaburi Province
- Phra Ajahn Kham Bo Thitapanyo Wat Mai Ban Tan Sakon Nakhon Province
- Luang Pu Charoen Yanawuttho Wat Tham Pak Piang Chiang Dao District Chiang Mai Province
- Phra Khru Udom Phawanachan (Luang Pu Thongsuk Uttarapanyo) Wat Analayothipyaram Mueang Phayao District Phayao Province
- Phra Ajahn Plian Panyapatipo Aranyawiwek Temple Chiang Mai Province
- Phra Khru Chit Sophon (Som Sujitto) Wat Phra Bat Phu Phan Kham Khon Kaen Province
- Phra Ajarn Prasit Punyamakaro, Wat Pa Mu Mai Chiang Mai Province
- Phra Ajarn Sommai Jittapalo, Wat Pa Analayo Nakhon Pathom Province
- Phra Ajarn Tawi Jittakutto, Wat Aranyawiwek (Pa Lan) Chiang Rai Province
- Phra Ajarn Inthawai Santhusako, Wat Pa Na Kham Noi Udon Thani Province
- Phra Bodhiyanmuni (Phra Ajarn Muang Phonwattho), Wat Pa Matchimawat Kalasin Province
- Phra Ajarn Boonchan Chanthasilo, Wat Pa Kiew Du Chiang Mai Province
- Phra Ajarn Sai Wasavaro, Wat Tham Pha Bing Loei Province
- Phra Ajarn Luen Ophaso, Wat Phra That Fun Sakon Nakhon Province
- Phra Ajarn Samdong Chanthachoto, Wat Pa Aranyaphrommaram Nakhon Ratchasima Province
- Phra Ajahn Pradit Khunsampanno, Khao Kiri Rom Temple Chiang Rai Province
- Phra Khru Kittipanyakun (Luang Pu Swat Panyatharo), Pongchan Temple Chanthaburi Province

== See also ==
- Thai Forest Tradition
- Wat Aranyawiwake
- Ajahn Mun
- Wat Doi Mae Pang
- Wat Chedi Luang
