= Thai Human Imagery Museum =

Wax museum in Thailand

Coordinates: 13.7728°N 100.2080°E

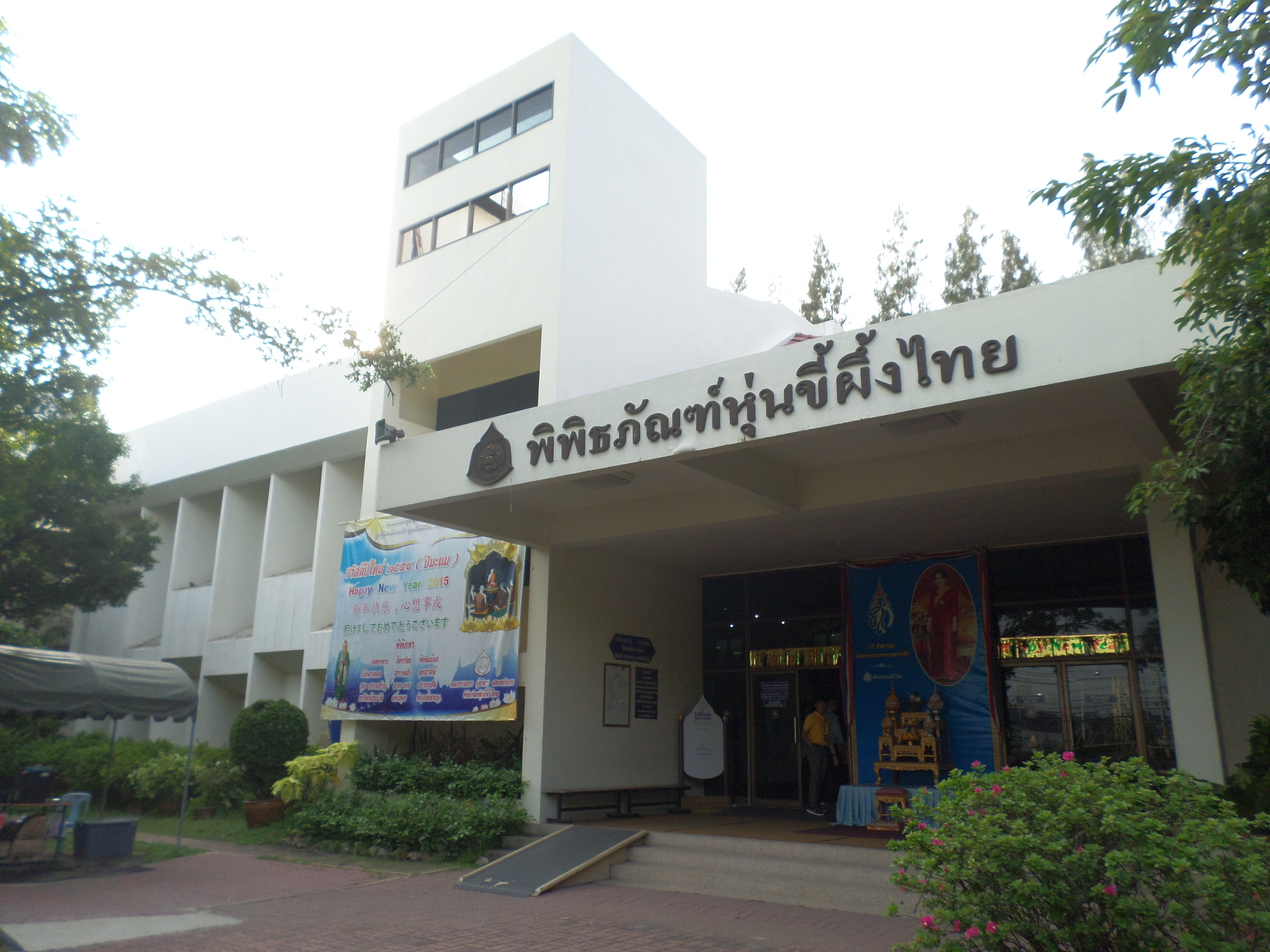
Thai Human Imagery Museum

The Thai Human Imagery Museum (Thai: พิพิธภัณฑ์หุ่นขี้ผึ้งไทย) is a wax museum located in Nakhon Pathom Province, Thailand. Due to the tropical climate of Thailand the figures are made of fibreglass instead of the traditional wax.

== History ==
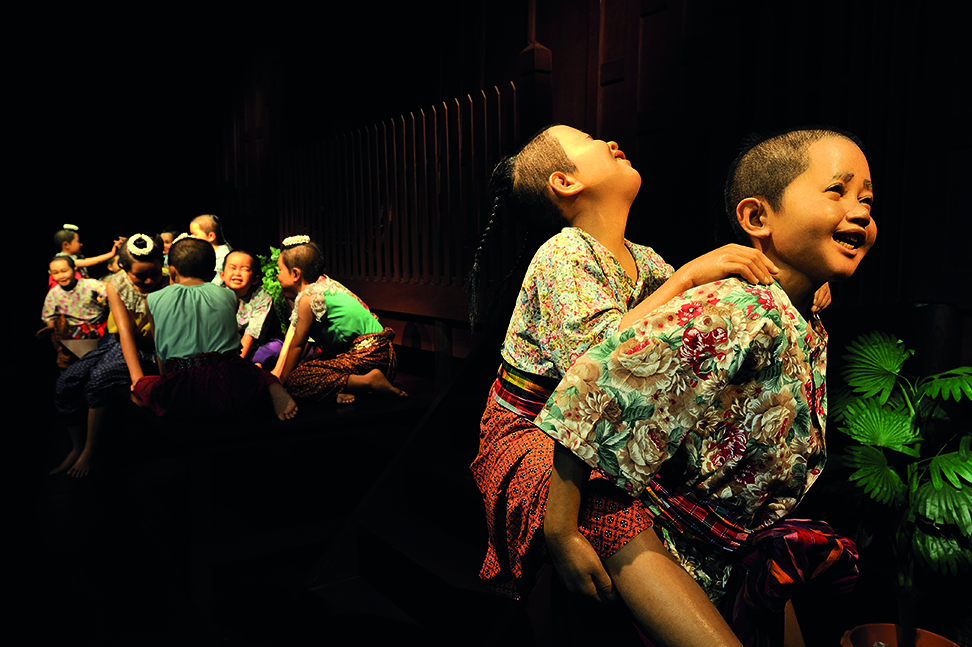
Thai arts and culture fiberglass figures

The museum was opened on 14 June 1989. Thai Human Imagery Museum created by inspired Artist Duangkaew Phityakornsilp and his colleagues with an aim to promote and to preserve traditional Thai arts and culture. These artists spent over 10 years studying and experimenting on wax sculpture using fibre glass before succeeding in creating beautiful, exquisite, and durable ones.

== Exhibitions ==
Exhibits include Thai historical figures, including kings of the Chakri Dynasty, displays of Thai culture and traditions, and famous fictional characters, including those from Sunthorn Phu's epic poem, Phra Aphai Mani.

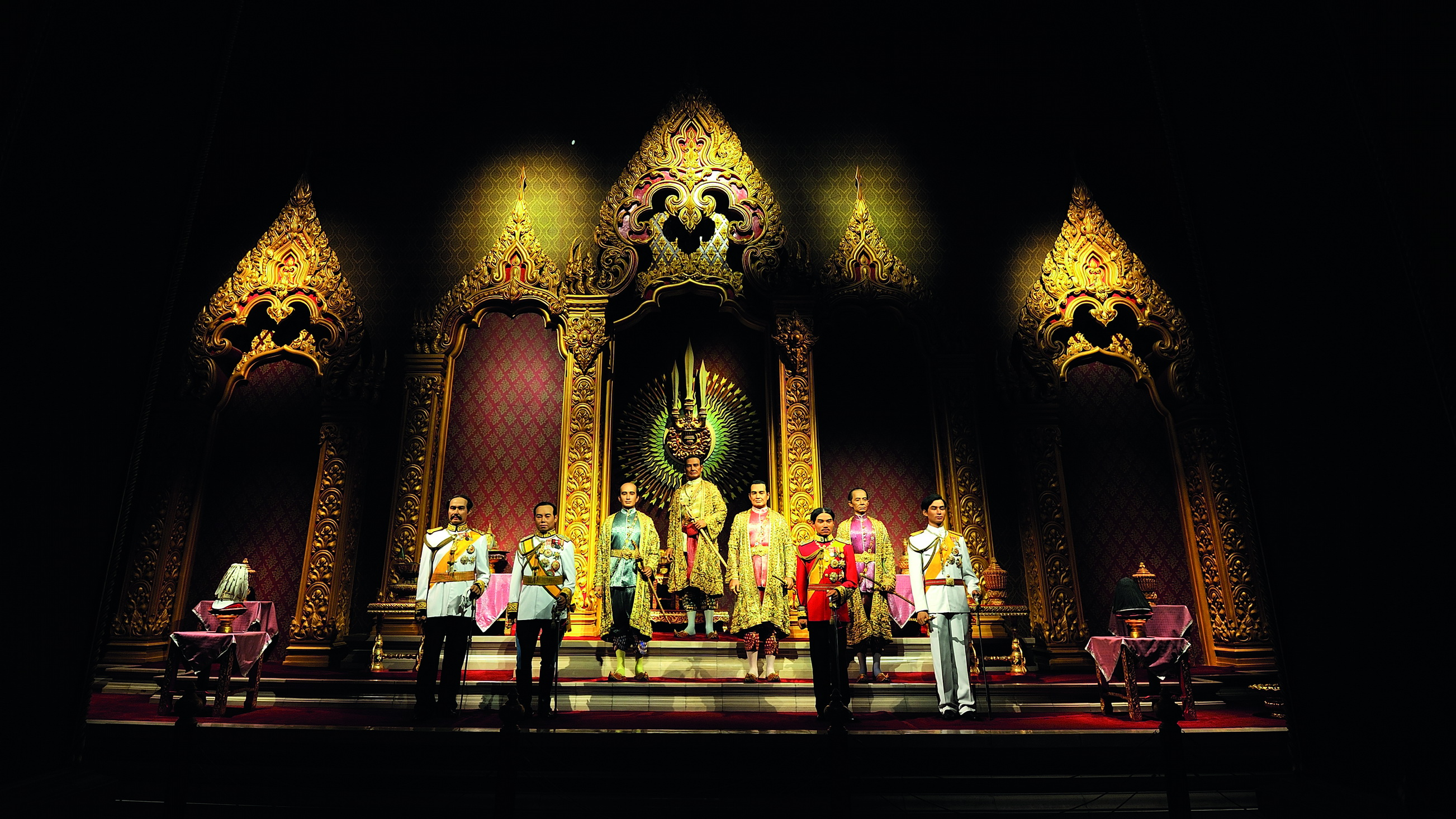
Kings of the Chakri Dynasty

== See also ==
- Tourism in Thailand
