= Phra =

Phra (พระ) is a Thai term that may refer to:

- Phra, a Thai-language term for Buddhist monk
- Phra, a Thai-language term for priest
- Phra, a Thai-language word used as a prefix denoting holy or royal status, including in Thai royal ranks and titles
- Phra, a Thai noble title

== Other uses ==
- Francesco "Phra" Barbaglia, Italian DJ and producer; see Crookers
