= Wat Pa Salawan =

Watpa Salawan
- วัดป่าสาลวัน

Religion
- Affiliation: Buddhism
- Sect: Theravada

Location
- Location: Nakhon Ratchasima, Thailand
- Country: Thailand
- Interactive map of Watpa Salawan
- Coordinates: 14.9673°N 102.0743°E

Watpa Salawan (Thai วัดป่าสาลวัน) is a Thai Theravada Buddhist ( Thai ธรรมยุต tam-má-yóot) forest temple located in downtown Nakhon Ratchasima, Thailand.
