= Ajahn Sao Kantasīlo =

Buddhist monk of Thai Forest Tradition (1859–1942)

Phra Khru Vivekbuddhakij (Sao Kantasilo)
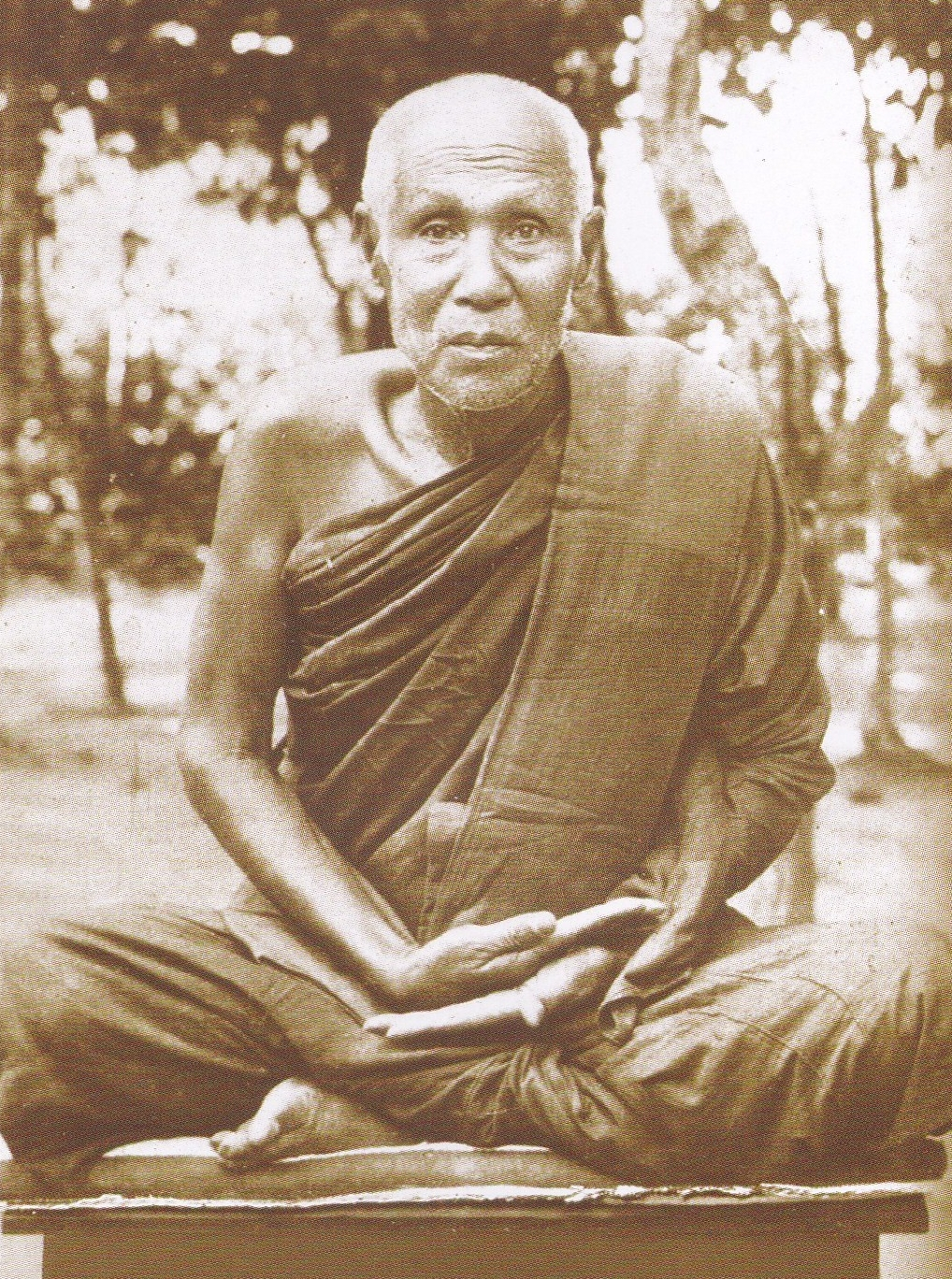
- Title: Luang Por

Personal life
- Born: Sao; November 2, 1859 Ban Kha Khom, Tambon Nong Khon, Amphoe Mueang Ubon Ratchathani, Ubon Ratchathani Province, Siam
- Died: February 3, 1942 (aged 82) Wat Amatayaram, Amphoe Wan Waithayakon, Champasak Province (under Thai rules)
- Other names: Ajahn Sao; Luang Pu Sao

Religious life
- Religion: Buddhism
- School: Theravada, Dhammayuttika Nikaya
- Lineage: Thai Forest Tradition
- Dharma name: Kantasilo
- Profession: Buddhist monastic

Senior posting
- Students: Ajahn Mun Bhuridatta

Ajahn Sao Kantasilo (1859–1942) was a monk in the Thai Forest Tradition of Theravada Buddhism. He was a member of the Dhammayuttika Nikaya.

Ajahn Sao was ordained as a monk at the age of 20, entering the Maha Nikaya order. In 1887 he re-ordained in the Dhammayut order. Both ordinations were in Ubon Ratchathani Province.

Ajahn Mun Bhuridatta Mahathera was one of his most well-known students. The two were known to often travel together, wandering throughout the forests of Thailand in the “tudong” tradition of monks who leave behind the more sedentary monastery life and take up many (if not all) of the thirteen dhutanga austerities or ascetic practices allowed by the Buddha in the Pali Canon.

Ajahn Sao was greatly influenced, in his own practice and in teaching his disciples, by the methods advocated by Somdet Phra Vanarat Buddhasiri (1806-1891), one of the founders of the Dhammayut order. The latter’s teachings are found summarized in his treatise “Caturarakka Kammathana,” or “The Four Objects of Meditation That Give Protection.”

As a teacher, Ajahn Sao urged his disciples to be diligent, systematic and consistent. He taught them to wake at 3 a.m. and to practice sitting or walking meditation until 10 p.m.

== Early life and Ordination ==
Phra Khru Wiwek Phutthakit, originally named Sao, was born on November 2, 1859, at Ban Kha Khom, Nong Khon Subdistrict Mueang Ubon Ratchathani District Ubon Ratchathani Province. He was the son of Mr. Ta and Mrs. Mo, and had five siblings. Luang Pu Sao went to stay and serve as a disciple at Wat Tai, Mueang District, Ubon Ratchathani Province (currently called Wat Tai Phra Chao Yai Ong Tue or Wat Tai Thoeng) since the age of 12. He was later ordained as a novice in 1874, at the age of 15, at Wat Tai, which belonged to the Mahanikaya sect. While at Wat Tai, he studied Tham script, Khmer script, Tai Noi script, and Thai books according to the educational traditions of that era.

When he was old enough to be ordained in 1879, Luang Pu Sao was ordained as a monk in the Mahanikaya sect at Wat Tai, Mueang District, Ubon Ratchathani Province, and stayed at Wat Tai for 10 years. Later in 1889, Luang Pu Sao listened to the teachings of Phra Ajahn Mao Thewdhammi and was impressed. He asked to become a disciple and made a new resolution in the Thammayut sect at the Ubosot of Wat Sri Thong (Wat Sri Ubon Rattanaram) with Phra Khru Tha Chotipalo as the preceptor and Phra Athikan Sita Chayaseno as the kammavachachana.

== Practice of the Dhamma ==
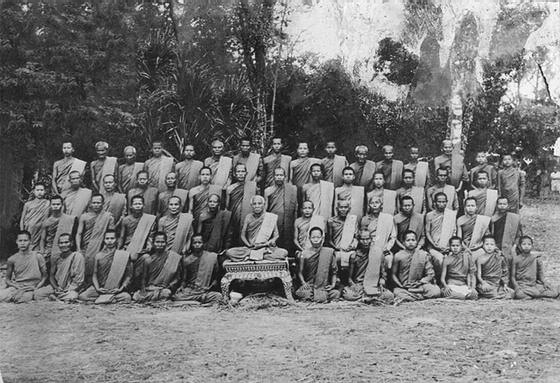
หลวงปู่เสาร์ กนฺตสีโล และคณะพระภิกษุสามเณร ณ วัดป่าข่าโคม จ.อุบลราชธานี

He was a person with a disposition leaning towards Samatha-Vipassana, had excellent diligence, was calm, had polite manners, was composed, spoke little, and was happy to teach others in that way. He was a person who was devoted to ascetic practices, was strict in the Dhamma and Vinaya, liked solitude, and was not attached to a place. He had to walk on foot to find solitude to develop his Dhamma in the forests and mountains in various places, both in Thailand and Laos.

In the years 1891-1893, Luang Pu Sao went on foot through Ban Kham Bong, Si Mueang Mai District, Ubon Ratchathani Province. He preached to Phra Ajahn Man when he was still a layman until he developed faith and followed him to ordain. This point was the greatness of the Kammathan family up until the present. The Kammathan family therefore named Phra Ajahn Sao as “The Great Master of Meditation”

In the years 1916 - 1921, he resided at Tham Champa, Phu Pha Kut, Nong Sung Subdistrict, Kham Cha-i District, Mukdahan Province, and resided with Phra Ajahn Mun.

One day, Luang Pu Sao was sitting alone in a secluded place. He contemplated the Noble Truths and realized and saw them in accordance with their truth. On that day, he was able to completely cut off all doubts. As the time of the end of the Buddhist Lent approached, he clearly understood the truth in every respect. He then told Phra Ajahn Mun, “I have given up my desire to become a Pacceka Buddha and I have seen the truth in accordance with its truth.” When Phra Ajahn Mun heard this, he was filled with great joy and realized through his mind, “Luang Pu Sao has definitely found the Dhamma of liberation in this life.”

== Death ==
Phra Khru Wiwek Phutthakit (Sao Kantasilo) died on Tuesday, the 3rd waning moon of the 3rd lunar month in the Year of the Snake, corresponding to February 3, 1942, at the age of 82, having completed 62 years in monkhood.

He died while sitting in meditation and paying respect to the principal Buddha image for the third time in the ordination hall (Ubosot) of Wat Amatyaram, located in Wanwaithayakorn District, Nakhon Champasak Province, Thailand at that time (now part of Champassak District, Champasak Province, Laos). According to reports, he died "with full mindfulness and plenitude".

His disciples transported his body back to Wat Buraparam in Mueang Ubon Ratchathani District, Ubon Ratchathani Province, where his cremation was held on April 15–16, 1943.

After the cremation, his bone fragments were distributed among followers across various Thai provinces. According to devotees, some of these fragments transformed into crystal-like relics (Pali: sarīra-dhātu) in various hues.

== Students ==
- Luang Pu Mun Bhuridatto
- Phra Yanawisit Samitthiwirajarn (Sing Khantayagamo)
- Phra Rajanirodharangsi (Thet Desaramsi)
- Phra Khru Yanasobhit, Phra Ajarn Miyanmuni, Wat Pa Sung Noen, Nakhon Ratchasima Province
- Phra Ajarn Si Thao, Ban Waeng, Yasothon Province
- Phra Ajarn Phrom, Ban Khokron, Yasothon Province
- Phra Ajarn Boonmak Thitapanyo, Wat Amat, Champasak Lao Education Organization
- Phra Ajarn Dee Channo
- Phra Ajarn Kinnaree Vuddhiyo, Wat Pa Kantasilawat, Nakhon Phanom Province
- Phra Ajarn Thongrat Kantasilo, Wat Pa Ban Kum, Ubon Ratchathani Province
- Phra Khru Phawananusat, Phra Ajarn Asai Charuwanno, Wat Pa Nong Yao, Ubon Ratchathani Province
- Phra Ajarn Phrom Kut Nam Khiao, Suwannaphum District, Roi Et Province
- Phra Ajarn Tha, Wat Tham Sap Mued, Pak Chong District, Nakhon Ratchasima Province
- Phra Ajarn Kongkaew Khantiko, Wat Pa Klang Sanam, Mukdahan Province
- Phra Ajarn Pun, went into the forest, Wat Pa Chantaram, Ban Kham Daeng, Yasothon Province
- Phra Ajarn Ki Thammatmo, Wat Pa Sanam Chai, Ubon Ratchathani Province
- Phra Ajarn Phon Saccavaro, Wat Ban Kaeng Yang, Buntharik District, Ubon Ratchathani Province
- Phra Khru Panyaอisut, Phra Ajarn Buapa Panyabhaso, Wat Pa Phra Sathit, Nong Khai Province
- Phra Thepsangworayan (Phuang Sukhindriyo), Wat Si Thammaram, Yasothon Province
- Phra Ajarn Kongkaew Thanapanyo, Wat Pa Thepburum, Ban Kaeng Yang, Phibun Mangsahan District, Ubon Ratchathani Province
- Phra Ajarn Aun Pakkhuno, Wat Chanthiyawas, Ban Namakhuea, Pla Pak District, Nakhon Phanom Province
