= Luang Por =

Respectful title for Thai senior monastics

Luang por (Thai: หลวงพ่อ; RTGS: luang pho, Thai pronunciation: [lǔəŋpʰɔ̂ː]; Lao: ຫຼວງ ພໍ່, romanized: lūang phǭ) means "venerable father" and is used as a title for respected senior Buddhist monastics. Luang is a Thai word meaning "royal" or "venerable". It is used in both family context and to express respect for monastics. Por is the Thai word for "father". It is used in both family context and in venerations. For instance, Luang Por Ajahn Chah was a well-known and widely respected monk. In his middle and older years as respect for him grew, people sometimes referred to him simply as "Luang Por". It is more common to see the word spelled 'Luang Phor' these days.

Although "Luang Por" is the most common form of reference, there are various other terms used to speak of or to a Monk, such as "Luang Pi”, “Luang Phu”, or “Luang Dta". This can also be seen in the example given above ("Luang Por Chah") this Monk was also called alternatively "Luang Phu Chah", especially as he got older. To know how to refer to a person judging by their age requires spending time with Thai people in order to develop a subtle feel for the situation and know which title each person should have in relation to yourself, as Ajarn Spencer Littlewood explains in his E-zine, 'Buddha Magic';

"The age of the Monk and the age of the person speaking to the monk will normally affect the way in which a person refers to that Monk. The system is Vague and is a reflection of the method of respect used in everyday Cotidian life in Thailand, where age means status, and the classification of the terminology used for different Family relatives is doubly complex as that Western system. A person who is slightly older than yourself would normally be referred to as "Pi" (meaning older brother or sister), and a younger person would be called "Nong". Therefore, if not knowing the title of a Monk, one should see if they are old enough to be ones older brother, one should call them "Luang Pi" (unless they are a famously established monk, and already have been commonly referred to as "Luang Pi". If the Monk could be ones Uncle or Father, then "Luang Por". "Luang Lung" is sometimes, but very rarely used, meaning "reverend uncle" but the uncle term is hardly ever to be heard at all, and in most cases the father term is used in its place. The one exception is the word "Nong" (meaning younger brother or sister) which is never used by a layperson to a Monk, only older terms are used. This is because all Monks are older than laypersons, because, they are 'waking up first, and therefore older'. If old enough to be ones Grandfather, then one should call him either "Luang Phu" or "Luang Dta". "Luang Phu" is a grandfather on the mothers side, and "Luang Dta", is a grandfather on the fathers side".

Some famous Luang Por or Luang Pu are:

- Luang Por Dattajivo
- Luang Por Dhammajayo
- Luang Por Khun Parissuddho
- Luangpor Thong
- Luang Pu Sodh Candasaro
- Luang Pu Thuat
- Luang Pu Waen Suciṇṇo
