= Ajahn Mun =

Buddhist monk of Thai Forest Tradition (1870–1949)

Personal life
- Born: Mun; January 20, 1870 Ban Khambong, Khong Chiam (now Si Mueang Mai), Ubon Ratchathani, Thailand
- Died: November 11, 1949 (aged 79) Wat Pa Sutthawat, Mueang Sakon Nakhon, Sakon Nakhon, Thailand
- Other names: Thai: Luang Pu Mun (หลวงปู่มั่น); Ajahn Mun (Thai: อาจารย์มั่น)
- Occupation: Meditation master
- Website: Full Bio

Religious life
- Religion: Buddhism
- School: Theravada, Dhammayuttika Nikaya
- Lineage: Thai Forest Tradition
- Dharma name: Bhuridatto

Senior posting
- Teacher: Ajahn Sao Kantasīlo
- Predecessor: Ajahn Sao Kantasīlo

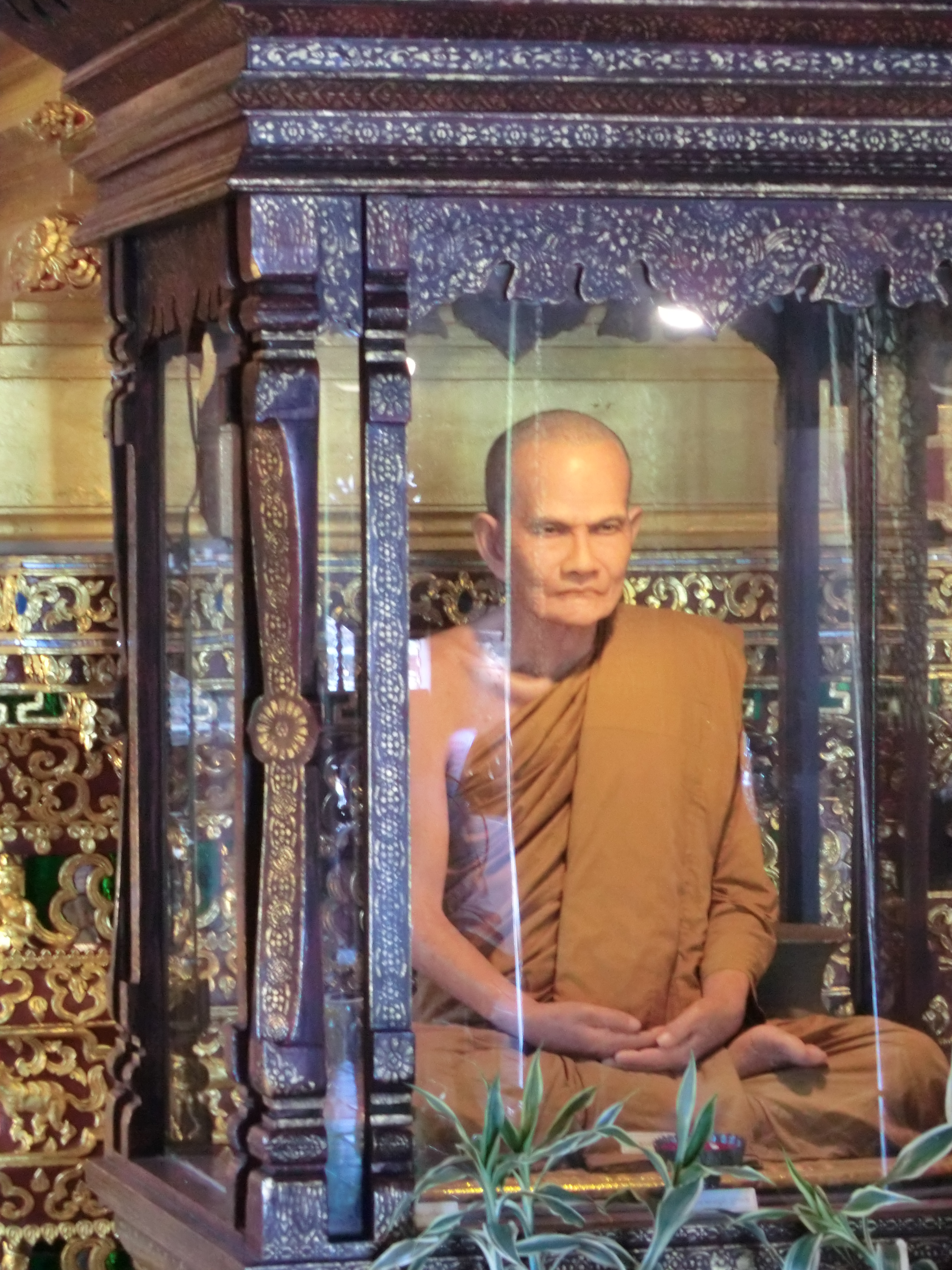
A wax statue of Ajahn Mun at Wat Chedi Luang in Chiang Mai, Thailand

Luang Pu Mun Bhuridatto (Thai: มั่น ภูริทตฺโต, RTGS: Man Phurithatto; 20 January 1870 – 11 November 1949) was a Thai bhikkhu from the Isan region credited, along with his mentor Ajahn Sao Kantasīlo, with establishing the Thai Forest Tradition or "Kammaṭṭhāna tradition" that spread throughout Thailand and abroad.

Ajahn Mun strictly followed the Buddha's teachings and adhered to austere ascetic practices (dhutanga) with exemplary discipline. Highly respected as an outstanding ascetic monk, he laid down the path of practicing samatha (calming meditation) and vipassana (insight meditation) according to the Buddha's doctrine, teaching monks and laypeople alike. His teachings became widely known as the Forest Tradition Teachings (Ajahn Mun lineage).

After his death in 1949, many disciples continued his meditation lineage, known as the Forest Meditation Tradition or Ajahn Mun Forest Tradition. For this reason, he is honored as the Great Teacher of the Forest Tradition or The Great Patriarch of the Forest Meditation Lineage.

== Biography ==
=== Birth and early life ===
Ajahn Mun was born Mun Kaenkaew on Thursday, 20 January 1870, at Ban Kham Bong, Song Yang Subdistrict, Khong Chiam District (now Si Mueang Mai District), Ubon Ratchathani Province. His parents were Mr. Kham Duang Kaenkaew and Mrs. Jan Kaenkaew.

=== Novitiate ===
At age 15, he was ordained as a novice monk (samanera) at Wat Ban Kham Bong. After two years, he disrobed to help family work at his father's request, but felt drawn back to monastic life, recalling his grandmother's instruction to ordain for her. Later, Phra Kru Wiwek Buddhakit (Saen Kantasilo) came on ascetic pilgrimage and Ajahn Mun served him devotedly, admiring his strict discipline, becoming his disciple and traveling with him to Ubon Ratchathani.

=== Ordination ===
At age 23, he was fully ordained as a monk at Wat Liap, Mueang Ubon Ratchathani District, on 12 June 1893, with Phra Ariyakhawi (On Dhammarakkhito) as preceptor. He received the Pali monastic name Bhuridatto, meaning "One who gives wisdom." Doubting aspects of his ordination and sanghati robe, he re-ordained about a year later in a ceremony led by Phra Kru Wijitthammaphani (Jan Sirijanto) at Pak Klang on the Mun River.

== Monastic life, spiritual quest, and practice ==
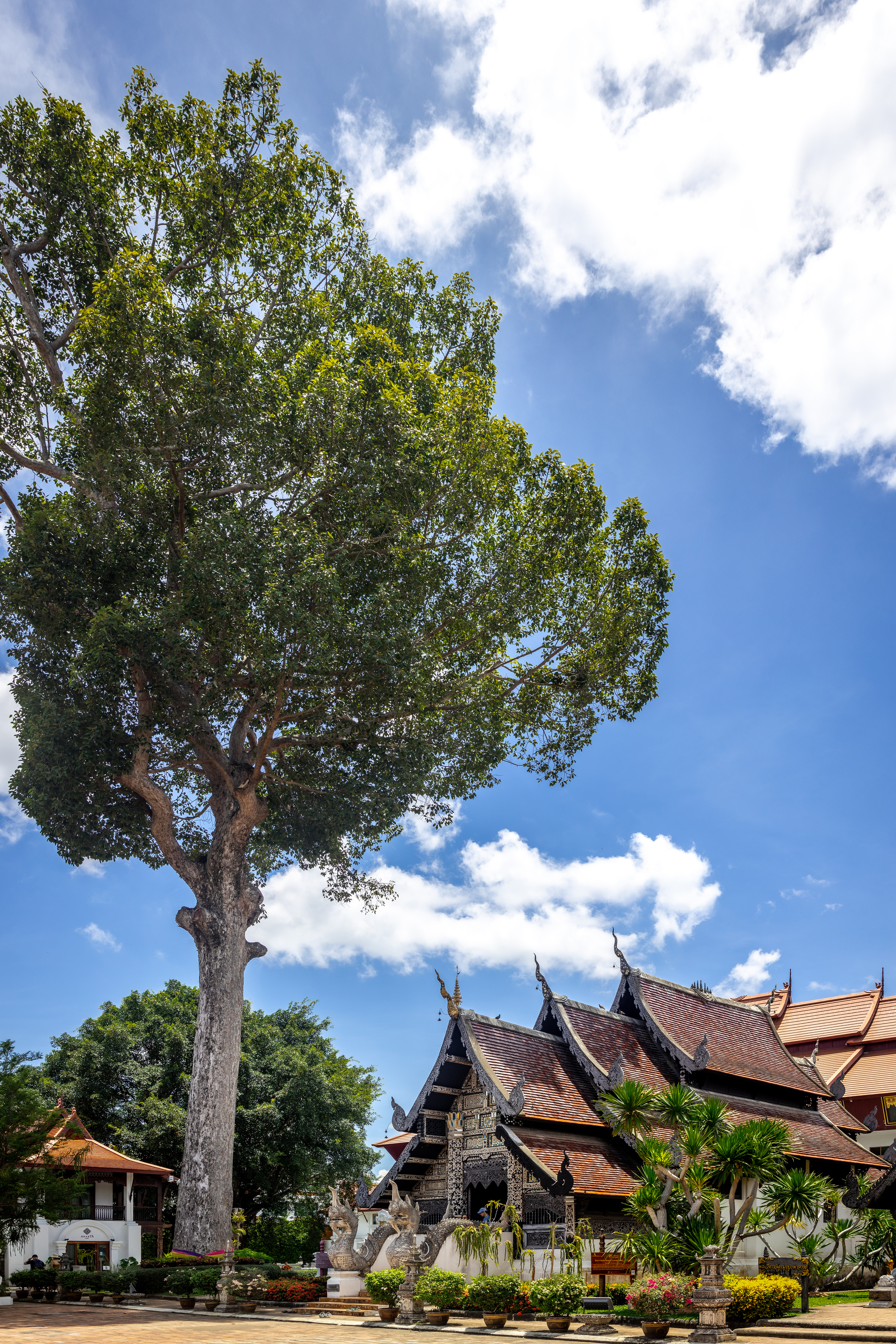
The vihara dedicated to Luang Pu Mun Bhuridatto at Wat Chedi Luang Worawihan, Mueang Chiang Mai District, Chiang Mai Province

From 1893 Ajahn Mun studied meditation at Wat Liap, and began wandering ascetic pilgrimage (dhutanga) with Phra Kru Wiwek Buddhakit along the Mekong River on Thai and Laotian sides. With Luang Pu No Thitpanyo, he practiced seclusion at Wat Phra That Phanom Woramahawihan in 1900, inspiring local reverence for the sacred relic stupa, now a major religious monument in northeast Thailand.

He wandered through Ubon Ratchathani, Nakhon Phanom, Sakon Nakhon, Loei Province, and traveled to Myanmar.

In 1912, at Sarika Cave in Nakhon Nayok Province, he undertook solitary ascetic practice. Despite chronic abdominal pain, he meditated deeply on impermanence and foulness (asubha bhavana), reaching a profound state after three days. He had visions reflecting past lives and renounced delayed aspirations of Buddhahood, resolving for liberation in this life. His mind unified, perceiving the world as calm and smooth, reflecting mind's nature.

Afterward, he practiced at Singto Cave, Khao Phra Ngam, Lopburi Province, then was invited to teach vipassana at Wat Pathum Wanaram, Bangkok in 1914.

In 1915, he returned to Ubon Ratchathani, residing at Wat Burapharam, then wandered through northeast provinces teaching meditation, gaining many disciples.

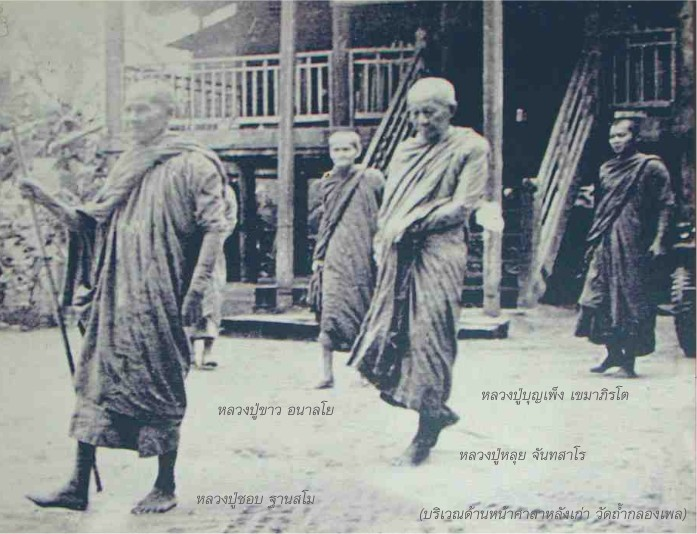
Photo of disciples of Luang Pu Mun Bhuridatto

In 1928, appointed abbot of Wat Chedi Luang Worawihan in Chiang Mai Province, he reluctantly accepted out of respect for Phra Ubali Khunuphamacharya (Jan Sirijanto). He ordained only one monk, Phra Ajahn Ket Wannako. After one rains retreat, he gave up the abbot position and ecclesiastical rank, emphasizing that attachment to reputation and honor undermines practice.

He then wandered northern forests for 12 years, living in districts of Chiang Mai and Chiang Rai Provinces, caring for a benefactor named Mae Bunpan at Ban Mae Koi, where Wat Pa Mae Koi (Wat Pa Phra Ajahn Mun) is now located.

Ajahn Mun attained highest enlightenment at Dok Kham Cave in Phrao District, Chiang Mai Province. He told his disciple Luang Pu Khao Analayo: "I have finished my work. Now I just weave baskets and help my disciples as I can." He taught many disciples to attain high enlightenment, earning the title The Great Teacher of the Forest Meditation Tradition.

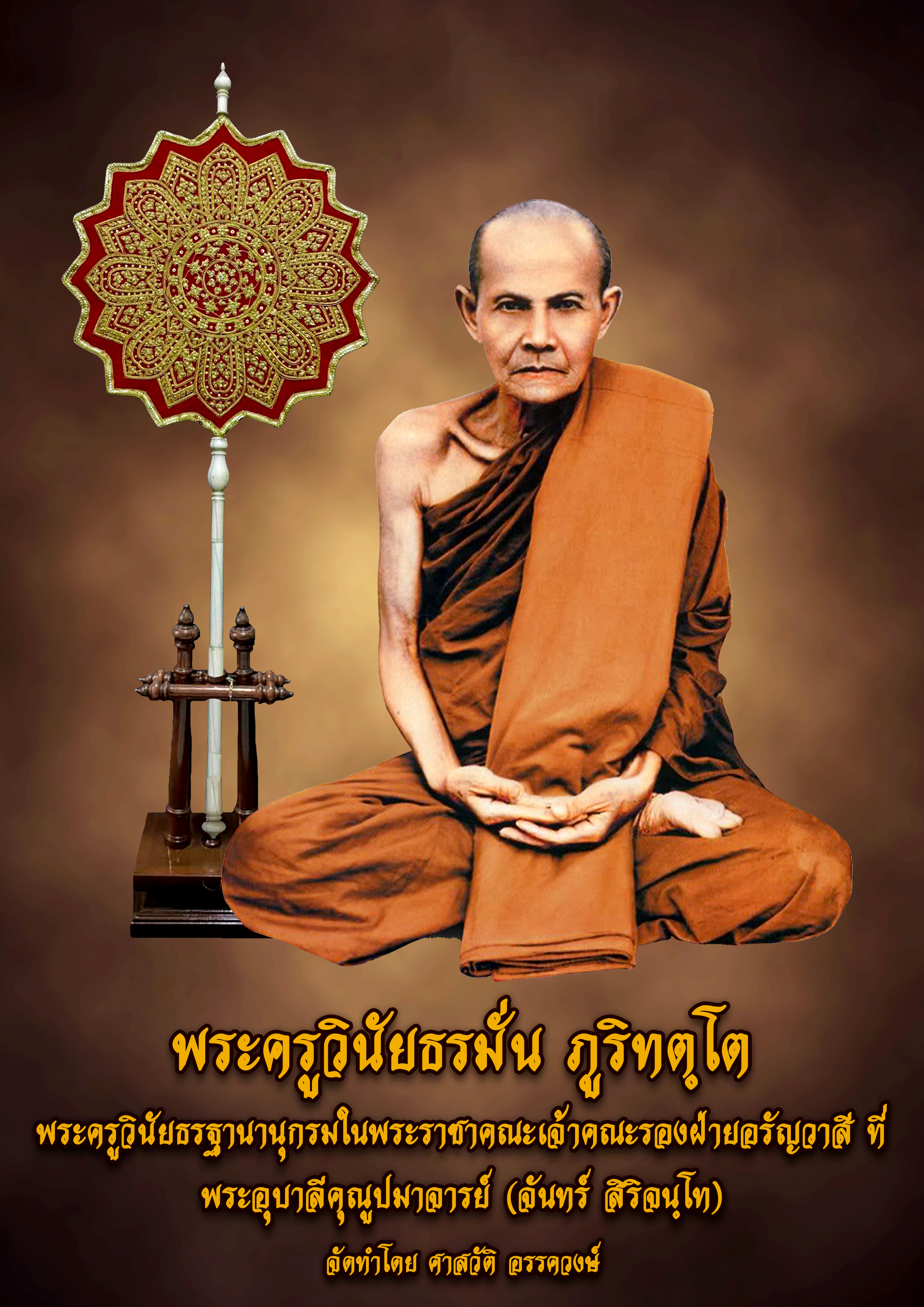
Poster image of Luang Pu Mun

In 1939, invited by Phra Thammachedi (Jum Phandulo), he traveled to northeast Thailand (Isan) to teach meditation. He stayed at several temples including Wat Pa Salawan and Wat Pa Non Niwet, later settling at Wat Pa Ban Nong Phue in Sakon Nakhon Province, devoting himself to teaching until his last days.

Luang Pu Mun is revered as the master of the forest meditation tradition of his era. Disciples attest to his vast meditative knowledge and attainment of the Four Types of Profound Penetration (Patisambhida):

1. Attatapatibhana – penetration of meaning
2. Dhammapatibhana – penetration of the Dhamma
3. Niruttipatibhana – penetration of language
4. Patiganapatibhana – penetration of wisdom

His lifelong practice was rooted in the dhutanga (ascetic pilgrimage). The seven key dhutanga practices he maintained until death are:

1. Pamsukulikang dhutanga – wearing only patched robes
2. Pindapatikang dhutanga – going on almsround daily
3. Ekapattikang dhutanga – using only one alms bowl
4. Ekasanikang dhutanga – eating only one meal per day
5. Khalupacchapattikang dhutanga – not accepting more food after starting to eat
6. Tejivaritang dhutanga – using only three robes
7. Aranyikang dhutanga – avoiding staying near villages or homes

== Attainments ==
According to his foremost disciple Ajahn Maha Bua Ñāṇasampanno, Ajahn Mun Bhuridatto attained full enlightenment (arahantship) while practicing in Sarika Cave (ถ้ำสาริกา), Nakhon Nayok. In Ajahn Maha Bua's account, Ajahn Mun endured a prolonged illness during the retreat, refused all medicine, and relied solely on meditative discipline. He entered unwavering one-pointed concentration, investigated the aggregates to their cessation, and emerged with a mind described as "immovable, all-knowing, and utterly free."

Anthropologist Stanley J. Tambiah recounts that during this same retreat Ajahn Mun confronted a terrifying vision of a club-wielding guardian spirit. Standing his ground with calm awareness, he watched the figure transform into a respectful guardian who pledged to protect him. Tambiah notes that at that moment "the illness totally disappeared, and the mind withdrew into absolute, unshakable one-pointedness," a decisive breakthrough that Ajahn Mun's disciples regard as his attainment of the non-returner (anāgāmi) stage.

Later Thai Forest masters have pointed to Ajahn Mun's Sarika Cave practice as a model of determination and insight, combining rigorous ascetic discipline with profound meditative absorption, and have credited it as the foundation for the lineage's emphasis on solitary wilderness meditation.

== Death ==
Luang Pu Mun died on 11 November 1949 at age 79, after 56 years ordained, at Wat Pa Sutthawat, Mueang Sakon Nakhon District, Sakon Nakhon Province, after an 11-day illness. His relics became sacred relics (phra that) at several locations distributed across provinces.

Disciples transported him to Wat Pa Sutthawat where he died peacefully. His attendant Luang Ta Thongkham Charuwanno recorded:

"... From Phanna Nikhom to Wat Pa Sutthawat, Sakon Nakhon, it was almost noon because of the rough dirt road. He slept all the way. After arriving, he was laid in his kuti (monk's hut). Close disciples turned his head to the south; normally he would face east. Around 1 a.m., he awakened and spoke faintly, waving his hand, but no one knew his wish. One novice summoned senior monks who gathered. Observers saw he was near death but wanted to turn his head east. Ajahn La gently pushed his pillow so his head faced east. He seemed very tired, stopped moving, then became still but still breathing faintly. Ajahn Wan checked his pulse at his foot; it was rapid, then stopped quietly in peace..."

== Legacy ==
The "Wiriya Nasilwan Foundation" was established to propagate the teachings of this venerable meditation master.

== Bibliography ==
- Assoc. Prof. Dr. Pathom & Assoc. Prof. Phatra Nikomnon (2009). Luang Pu Mun Bhuridatto: Biography, Rules, and Practice, Burapha Literature Project Vol. 1. Bangkok: P.A. Leapwing Co., Ltd. p. 234.
- Assoc. Prof. Dr. Pathom & Assoc. Prof. Phatra Nikomnon (2011). Phra Yan Wisitsamithwi Rajajarn (Luang Pu Singh Khantayakamo), Wat Salawan Forest Monastery, Nakhon Ratchasima, Burapha Literature Project Vol. 2. Bangkok: P.A. Leapwing Co., Ltd. p. 657.
- Assoc. Prof. Dr. Pathom & Assoc. Prof. Phatra Nikomnon (2003). Phra Kru Wiwek Buddhakit, Great Master Saen Kantasilo, the Great Patriarch of Forest Meditation, Burapha Literature Project Vol. 5. Bangkok: P.A. Leapwing Co., Ltd. p. 610.
- Phra Dhammatharo Kruba Jaew (2011). Dhamma Biography of Luang Pu Cham Mahapunyo the Great Merit Maker. Bangkok: Matichon Press. p. 622.
