= Myokyo-ni =

Rinzai Zen Buddhist nun (1921–2007)

Ven Myokyo-ni
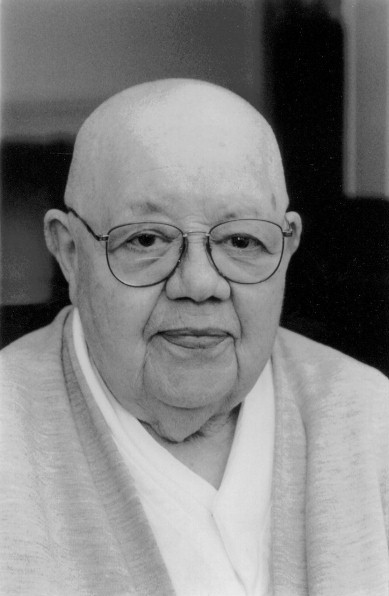

Personal life
- Born: Irmgard Schlögl; 29 January 1921 Leitersdorf im Raabtal, Styria, Austria
- Died: 29 March 2007 (aged 86) Fairlight Zen Buddhist Monastery, Luton, UK

Religious life
- Religion: Buddhism
- School: Rinzai

Senior posting
- Teacher: Oda Sesso; Sojun Kannon

Myokyo-ni (born Irmgard Schlögl; 29 January 1921 – 29 March 2007) was a Rinzai Zen Buddhist nun and head of the Zen Centre in London.

== Biography ==
Raised in Leitersdorf im Raabtal, Styria, Austria, Schlögl obtained a Ph.D. degree in geology from Graz University before joining the Zen Group at the Buddhist Society under Christmas Humphreys in 1950. In 1960 she went to Japan and trained at Daitoku-ji monastery for six years under Oda Sesso Rōshi and, after his death, for a further six years under his successor Sojun Kannon Rōshi. In 1966, following the death of Oda Sesso Roshi, she returned to England for nine months, during which time she started a small Zazen Group at the Buddhist Society which continued until she returned permanently in 1972. With the introduction of another Zazen class, and then a beginners' class, running alongside Christmas Humphreys' original Zen Class, the Zen Group grew in size until the Zen Centre was formally established in 1979. During this period she was living at the home of Christmas Humphreys whom she referred to affectionately as 'father'. On his death in 1983, his residence was bequeathed to the Zen Centre becoming Shobo-an, Hermitage of the True Dharma, a residential training temple.

In 1984, Sōkō Morinaga Rōshi, who had been head monk at Daitoku-ji during her time there, visited England with a retinue of seven monks, the requisite number to ordain her as both nun and teacher and to inaugurate Shobo-an. The ordination took place at Chithurst Forest Monastery on 22 July at the invitation of the Abbot Ajahn Sumedho. Sōkō Morinaga Rōshi gave her the name Myokyo-ni, which was the name he had given her as a Zen student in Japan. The name is from Myokyo meaning 'mirror of the subtle' and ni meaning 'nun'.

Myokyo-ni is the author of a number of books on Zen and Buddhism, including a translation of The Zen Teaching of Rinzai (Linji). She guided the translation of the Discourse on the Inexhaustible Lamp by Master Tōrei Enji, which was awarded the Culture Prize by the Japanese Translators' Association in 1991.

From 2002 until her death in 2007, Ven. Myokyo-ni lived at Fairlight (Luton), one of the Zen Centre's two training temples, where she received students and gave regular teisho (Zen talks). Fairlight was founded and inaugurated as a Zen Buddhist temple by Myokyo-ni on 8 April 1996. Both temples continue to run under her disciples, providing meditation classes, holding regular sessions and offering residential facilities for Zen Centre members. Fairlight is now run by the Venerable Sogen, with the assistance of Ven. Myosui and Shobo-an in St John's Wood, London is run by Ven. Myokun. Ven. Sogen was ordained on 18 July 1998 and Ven. Myosui and Ven. Myokun on 26 June 2004.

Daiyu (meaning 'Great Oak') was added to Ven. Myokyo-ni's name posthumously so that she is now formally known as Daiyu Myokyo Zenji.

== Bibliography ==
- Wisdom of the Zen Masters (1976) (under her pre-ordination name Irmgard Schlögl)
- The Zen Way (1977)
- Introducing Buddhism (1978)
- Gentling the Bull: The Ten Bull Pictures, a Spiritual Journey (1980)
- Living Buddhism (2000)
- The Daily Devotional Chants of the Zen Centre (2008)

=== Translation and editing ===
- The Record of Rinzai (1976) (under her pre-ordination name Irmgard Schlögl)
- The Ceasing of Notions (1988) (with Sōkō Morinaga Rōshi and Michelle Bromley)
- The Bull and his Herdsman (1989) by Daizokutsu R Otsu (from the German Der Ochs und sein Hirte by Tsujumura and Buchner)
- The Discourse on The Inexhaustible Lamp of the Zen School (1989) (also translated by Yoko Okuda)

=== Other writings ===
- Introduction for Thomas Merton on Zen (1976). Sheldon Press.

== See also ==
- Buddhism in Europe
- List of Rinzai Buddhists
