= Ryomo Kyokai =

Lay Zen Buddhist organisation in Japan

Ryōmō Kyōkai (両忘協会 "Ryōmō Society") was a lay Rinzai Zen Buddhist Dharma center located in Tokyo, Japan.

== History ==
=== Intellectual society ===
Ryōmō Kyōkai means "Association for the Abandonment of the Concepts of Objectivity and Subjectivity". It was founded at the beginning of the Meiji restoration, when Japan started to modernise:

The Zen lay practitioners Yamaoka Tesshū, Takahashi Deishu and other top leaders of our country asked Soryu-kutsu Imakita Kosen Roshi, the chief abbot of Engaku-ji Temple in Kamakura, to establish a group for intensive Zen meditation (the later Ryobo-Kai) in order to train promising figures, being anxious for the future of the State.

It attracted figures such as Imakita Kōsen (1816–1892) (abbot of the Rinzai monastery Engaku-ji, and teacher of Soyen Shaku), Nakajima Nobuyuki, Kawajiri Hōkin, and Nakae Chomin (1847–1901). Kōsen was its honorary leader but not its founder.

It served as an intellectual society for the discussion of Buddhism and zazen practice. The rules of the society were as follows:

1. Members could discuss anything they wanted except politics and "worldly affairs".
2. Meals were limited to rice, sake, and three bowls of vegetables.
3. Participants would be honest and polite.
4. New participants would be introduced by an existing member and affirm their vows every month.

=== Lay practice ===
Ryōmō Kyōkai was revived by Tetsuo Sōkatsu, Dharma heir of Soyen Shaku. The revival was more frequently called "Ryōbō Zen Kyōkai" or "Ryōbō Kai" in Japan, owing to a more modern kanji reading. Tetsuo Sōkatsu received the name Ryobo-an from Ryoga-kutsu Roshi. He opened Ryōbō Kai for lay practitioners, and went so far as to give Dharma transmission to lay practitioners, which before was restricted to priests.

In 1906 Sōkatsu traveled to the USA with a group of students, among them Sokei-an Sasaki and Gotō Zuigan, who would become two of his Dharma heirs. A branch was established on Sutter Street in San Francisco after Sōkatsu arrived in America. It attracted lay Buddhists and possibly inspired the form of Zen practice centers throughout the Western world. Sōkatsu stayed in the USA four years before returning to Japan, leaving only Sokei-an behind.

Sokei-an lived most of his adult life in the United States, returning to Japan only briefly on four occasions, principally to complete his Zen training and receive his final Dharma transmission from Sōkatsu. In 1930 he established the Buddhist Society of America in New York City, initially as a branch of Ryōmō Kyōkai; this was renamed the First Zen Institute of America after World War II, and continues to this day, in spite of having no resident teacher.

The Japanese revival was disbanded after World War II, and the San Francisco branch likely was lost during the Japanese American internment.

=== Ningen Zen Kyodan ===
Ryobo-an Roshi gave Dharma transmission to Koun-an Tatsuta Eizan Roshi, Ichimu-an Ohazama Chikudo Roshi, Gotō Zuigan Roshi, and Sokei-an Sasaki Shigetsu Roshi. Koun-an Roshi founded Ningen Zen, "Zen cultivation of the human spirit". The Ningen Zen Kyodan. Its mission is "to establish an earthly paradise". In this, it sees itself as "essentially different from the traditional Zen Buddhists who aimed principally at Dharma-transmission for the sake of Dharma-transmission." The Ningen Zen Kyodan has sixteen groups and sixteen meditation centers, and twelve Zen masters, who received Dharma transmission from Koun-an Roshi.
