= List of Rinzai Buddhists =

== A ==
- Ankokuji Ekei
- Sōgen Asahina
- Ashikaga Yoshimitsu

== B ==
- Bassui Tokushō
- George Bowman

== C ==
- Sherry Chayat
- Chō Tsuratatsu
- Chūgan Engetsu
- Leonard Cohen

== D ==
- Watazumi Doso
- Ji Gong
- Ogino Dokuon

== E ==
- Kanzan Egen
- Eisai
- Hakuin Ekaku
- Enni Ben’en

== F ==
- Mary Farkas
- Keido Fukushima

== G ==
- Jakushitsu Genko

== H ==
- Hōjō Tokimune
- Shodo Harada
- Hakuin Ekaku
- Thich Nhat Hanh
- Hsing Yun
- Hsin Pei
- Hsin Ping
- Hsin Ting

== I ==
- Issan Ichinei
- Ikkyu
- Imagawa Yoshimoto
- Imakita Kosen
- Kazuo Inamori
- Ingen Ryūki
- Ishin Sūden
- Itō Jakuchū

== J ==
- Ito Jakuchu
- Jakushitsu Genkō
- Kaisen Joki
- Josetsu

== K ==
- Imakita Kosen
- Kurt Kankan Spellmeyer
- Keian Genju

== L ==
- John Daido Loori

== M ==
- Genjo Marinello
- Soko Morinaga
- Myokyo-ni
- Taizan Maezumi
- Mujū
- Musō Soseki
- Meido Moore

== N ==
- Kyudo Nakagawa
- Soen Nakagawa
- Walter Nowick
- Eshin Nishimura

== O ==
- Ogino Dokuon
- Omori Sogen
- Enkyo Pat O'Hara

== P ==
- Puhua

== S ==
- Kyozan Joshu Sasaki
- Sengai
- Nyogen Senzaki
- Oda Sesso
- Soyen Shaku
- Eido Tai Shimano
- Denko Sommer
- Kokan Shiren
- Mugaku Sogen
- Sokei-an
- Muso Soseki
- Ishin Suden
- Daisetz Teitaro Suzuki
- Sakugen Shūryō
- Sasaki Gensō
- Sessai Choro
- Sesshū Tōyō
- Sesson Yūbai
- Sheng-yen
- Zenkei Shibayama
- Sōiku Shigematsu
- Kokan Shiren
- Shōtetsu
- Shunoku Sōen
- Gidō Shūshin
- Harada Daiun Sogaku
- Kobori Nanrei Sohaku
- Kurt Kankan Spellmeyer
- Maurine Stuart
- D. T. Suzuki

== T ==
- Takuan Sōhō
- Genki Takabayashi
- Bassui Tokushō
- Sesshu Toyo
- Fumio Toyoda
- Shinkichi Takahashi

== W ==
- Watazumi Doso

== Y ==
- Sobin Yamada
- Gempo Yamamoto
- Bankei Yōtaku
- Sesson Yubai
- Mumon Yamada
- William Nyogen Yeo
- Yishan Yining

== Z ==
- Dahui Zonggao
- Gotō Zuigan
