= Tetsuo Sōkatsu =

Japanese Rinzai-master (1870–1954)

- Title: Zen Master

Personal life
- Born: 1870
- Died: 1954 (aged 83–84)

Religious life
- Religion: Buddhism
- School: Rinzai

Senior posting
- Predecessor: Soyen Shaku
- Successor: Gotō Zuigan; Koun-an Tatsuta Eizan Roshi; Sokei-an Sasaki

Tetsuo Sōkatsu (1870–1954) was a Japanese Rinzai Zen rōshi. He was a Dharma heir of Soyen Shaku.

== Biography ==
Tetsuo Sokatsu received dharma transmission from Soyen Shaku at the age of 29. Thereafter he traveled throughout Japan, on "a pilgrimage of great Zen temples". Sokatsu continued his travels outside Japan for two years, visiting Burma, Ceylon and India, where he lived with "barefoot sadhus".

Soyen Shaku put him in charge of Ryōbō Kai, and gave him the hermitage-name "Ryobo-an". Sokatsu opened the hermitage for lay-practice, opening up the possibility of dharma transmission to lay practitioners. At the end of World War II Sokatsu closed Ryōbō Kai, but the lay practice was continued by his dharma heir Koun-an Roshi.

In 1906, Sokatsu went to California with a group of fourteen students, including Gotō Zuigan and Sokei-an Shigetsu Sasaki. He stayed there for four years, Sokei-an Sasaki being the only one to stay in the United States.

== Dharma heirs ==
- Gotō Zuigan, abbot of Daitoku-ji, teacher of Huston Smith, Walter Nowick
- Koun-an Tatsuta Eizan Roshi, founder of Ningen Zen Kyodan
- Sokei-an Sasaki, husband of Ruth Fuller Sasaki

== See also ==
- Buddhism in the United States
- Timeline of Zen Buddhism in the United States

== Sources ==
- Dumoulin, Heinrich (2005b), Zen Buddhism: A History. Volume 2: Japan, World Wisdom Books, ISBN 9780941532907
- Fields, Rick (1992), How the Swans Came to the Lake. A Narrative History of Buddhism in America, Boston & London: Shambhala
- Ford, James Ishmael (2006), Zen Master Who?: A Guide to the People And Stories of Zen, Wisdom Publications
