= Gotō Zuigan =

Buddhist Rinzai Zen master

- Title: Rōshi

Personal life
- Born: 1879 Ogaki, Gifu, Japan
- Died: 1965 (aged 85–86)

Religious life
- Religion: Buddhism
- School: Rinzai

Senior posting
- Based in: Myōshin-ji; Daitoku-ji
- Predecessor: Tetsuo Sōkatsu
- Successor: Oda Sessō

Gotō Zuigan (後藤 瑞巌; 1879–1965) was a Buddhist Rinzai Zen master (Note: "Shike", which is used for a select group of people, both in Rinzai and Soto, who are qualified to supervise the training of priests-to-be in the sodos, the training halls,) the chief abbot of Myōshin-ji and Daitoku-ji temples, and a past president of Hanazono University in Kyoto, also known as "Rinzai University". (Note: Rinzai is one of three major Zen sects in Japan, in addition to Sōtō and Ōbaku)

== Biography ==
Zuigan was influential in the development of Buddhism in America in the early 20th century. He was a student of the Zen master Tetsuo Sōkatsu and followed him to California in 1906 with a group of fourteen who went to the United States with Tetsuo Sōkatsu in 1906, attempting strawberry farming in Hayward, California, and founding a branch of Ryomo Kyokai on Sutter Street in San Francisco. (Note: The Ryomo-kyokai may have been the first Zen center in modern Japan dedicated to teaching meditation to laypersons, and it became the model for the urban lay meditation centers that were so influential in the propagation of Zen practice in western America.)

Zuigan returned to Japan in 1910. In 1916, Sōkatsu bestowed upon him the Inka Shōmei. (Note: Inka Shomei, or Dharma transmission, qualifies one to train students within the Rinzai sect as a Shike (master).) He then spent fifteen years as a missionary in Seoul.

Later, he returned to Japan and taught at the temple Daitoku-ji in Kyoto.

== Notable students ==
Among Zuigan's notable students were:

- The American religious scholar Huston Smith who studied with Zuigan for fifteen years.
- Pianist Walter Nowick who studied with Zuigan at Daitoku-ji beginning in 1950 until Zuigan's death in 1965.
- Sōkō Morinaga, Nowick's Dharma brother, who wrote in "Novice to Master: An Ongoing Lesson in the Extent of My Own Stupidity", who was also a head of Hanazono University. (Note: Darhma (dhamma) is a term for the collective teachings (doctrine or personal reality) of the Buddha.)
- The Dutch author Janwillem van de Wetering who lived a year and a half in Daitoku-ji with Nowick under Zuigan's successor Oda Sessō, and described this period of study in the book, "The Empty Mirror: Experiences in a Japanese Zen Monastery".

== Dharma heirs ==
- Oda Sessō

== See also ==
- Buddhism in Japan
- List of Rinzai Buddhists

== Sources ==
- Bodiford, William M. (2008), Dharma Transmission in Theory and Practice. In: Zen Ritual: Studies of Zen Buddhist Theory in Practice (PDF), Oxford University Press
- Borup, Jørn (2008), Japanese Rinzai Zen Buddhism: Myōshinji, a Living Religion, Brill
- Fields, Rick (1992), How the Swans Came to the Lake. A Narrative History of Buddhism in America, Boston & London: Shambhala
- Kraft, Kenneth (1988). Zen, Tradition and Transition: A Sourcebook by Contemporary Zen Masters and Scholars. Grove Press. ISBN 0-8021-3162-X.
- Levine, Gregory P.A. (2005). Daitokuji: The Visual Cultures of a Zen Monastery. University of Washington Press. pp. 316. ISBN 0-295-98540-2.
- Miura, Isshu; Ruth Fuller Sasaki (1993). The Zen Koan: Its History and Use in Rinzai Zen. HBJ. ISBN 0-15-699981-1. OCLC 174281293.
- Smith, Houston; Philip Novak (2004). Buddhism: A Concise Introduction. HarperCollins. ISBN 0-06-073067-6.
- Stirling, Isabel (2006), Zen Pioneer: The Life & Works of Ruth Fuller Sasaki, Shoemaker & Hoard, ISBN 978-1-59376-110-3
