= Ogino =

- Pronunciation: Japanese: [oŋino]
- Language: Japanese

Ogino is a Japanese surname. Notable people with the surname include:

- Ogino Dokuon (1819–1895), Rinzai roshi remembered for his resistance to oppression directed toward Buddhists during the late Tokugawa period and Meiji period of Japan
- Ogino Ginko (1851–1913), the first licensed and practicing woman physician of western medicine in Japan
- Kyusaku Ogino (1882–1975), Japanese doctor specializing in obstetrics and gynecology
- Makoto Ogino (born 1959), Japanese manga artist
- Masaji Ogino (born 1970), Japanese volleyball national player
- Tadahiro Ogino (born 1982), Nippon Professional Baseball for the Chiba Lotte Marines in Japan's Pacific League
- Shuji Ogino (born 1968), Japanese molecular pathological epidemiologist
- Yuka Ogino (born 1999), Japanese idol and singer
- Chihiro Ogino, fictional protagonist of the popular 2001 Japanese anime movie Spirited Away

== See also ==
- Ogino Station (disambiguation)
- Ogino Station (Toyama)
