= Walter Nowick =

Rinzai Zen Master

Walter Nowick (January 29, 1926—February 6, 2013) was an American teacher of Rinzai Zen. He was a Juilliard-trained pianist and a veteran of World War II. He studied Zen in Japan for 16 years while teaching university-level piano and voice, then returned to the United States to teach music and Zen in Surry, Maine, where he founded Moonspring Hermitage. He later founded the Surry Opera Company in the mid-1980s and retired from formal Zen teaching in 1985.

== Biography ==
=== Early years ===
Nowick's parents were immigrants of Russian-Polish origin. He grew up on a potato farm on Long Island, New York. He showed an early talent for music and studied piano at Juilliard School with Henriette Michaelson. She summered in Surry, and he first came to Maine as a teenager to study with her.

He left his piano study to serve in the Pacific during World War II, taking part in the final sweep of Okinawa after the island had surrendered. He eventually returned to his piano studies with Michaelson, who introduced him to Zen. He began sitting at the First Zen Institute of America, where Michaelson was a member.

=== Japan ===
Nowick went to Japan in 1950 to study Zen with Zuigan Gotō of Daitoku-ji. Nowick stayed in Japan for around 16 years until Zuigan Gotō's death in 1965. Janwillem van de Wetering lived a year and a half in Daitoku-Ji with Nowick, and described this in The Empty Mirror. Sōkō Morinaga, Walter Nowick's Dharma brother, wrote in Novice to Master about traditional practices at the time Nowick first went to Japan.

During Nowick's years in Japan he supported himself teaching piano and voice at the Kyoto Women's University. Nowick became known in the United States Zen community, which was very small at the time, as the first Westerner to have gone to Japan and completed the traditional Zen practice on their terms. Nowick was not given formal Dharma transmission—a point emphasized by Sōkō Morinaga Roshi during a visit to London. Nowick was also never ordained a priest but instead remained a layman. Three students of Zuigan Gotō are listed: Oda Sessō, Sōkō Morinaga and Walter Nowick.

=== Moonspring Hermitage ===
After the death of Zuigan Gotō in 1965, Nowick returned to the United States and began teaching Japanese musicians at his farm in Surry. After a few years, students of Zen began to arrive and many settled nearby. Some built homes on land provided by Nowick, sometimes living on his farm. These included both individuals and families with children. A student organization was incorporated as Moonspring Hermitage, a non-profit religious group, with a board of officers elected from among the students. The students built a zendo and meeting hall on Nowick's land, with an agreement specifying that the corporation and buildings belonged to the students and that the land would be turned over to them after 15 years.

A Rinzai Zen-style practice was established, though Nowick did not practice many of the externals of Japanese Zen, such as chants, robes, Buddhist names, lectures, precepts, and so on. Instead there was just work on his farm and koan study. At its peak in the mid-1970s, the group's membership was around 40 people. In 1975, Janwillem van de Wetering documented his experiences in this community in A Glimpse of Nothingness. His third Zen-book Afterzen was dedicated to Nowick.

=== Surry Opera Company ===
In the mid-1980s, concerned with the looming possibility of nuclear holocaust, Nowick founded the Surry Opera Company, an amateur group that intended to strengthen ties with the Soviet Union at a citizen level. This group went to the USSR a number of times and received national attention.

In 1985, shortly after the founding of the opera company, some of his students became concerned that he was spending too much time on the project. He offered his resignation as a teacher, which was accepted by the student committee, and devoted himself to music full-time. After some legal wrangling, the property reverted, as had been agreed before the student committee accepted his resignation, to the corporation, which had been reconstituted as the Morgan Bay Zendo (MBZ), with Nowick reserving some rights of usage. The MBZ has used and maintained the property ever since, with Walter visiting occasionally.

Nowick continued to live in Surry much of his life, spending some of the winter in Japan and Russia. In the summer, he gave piano concerts and received Russian guests for extended visits.

Nowick suffered a stroke in 2012 and also developed pneumonia. In declining health, he removed his feeding tube shortly before his death in the early hours of February 6, 2013. He was 87 years old.

== See also ==
- Buddhism in the United States
- List of Rinzai Buddhists
- Timeline of Zen Buddhism in the United States

== Sources ==
- Lachs, Stuart (2011), When the Saints Go Marching In: Modern Day Zen Hagiography (PDF)
- Wetering, Janwillem van de (1999), Afterzen. Experiences of a Zen Student Out on His Ear, New York: St. Martin's Press
