= Gerta Ital =

German-Japanese actress and Zen Buddhist monk

Gerta Maria Luise Karoline Ital

Personal life
- Born: 7 July 1904 Hanover, Germany
- Died: 21 July 1988 (aged 84) Munich, Germany
- Notable work(s): Der Meister, die Mönche und ich; Auf dem Weg zum Satori

Religious life
- Religion: Buddhism
- School: Rinzai school

Senior posting
- Teacher: Mumon Yamada

Gerta Maria Luise Karoline Ital (7 July 1904 – 21 July 1988) was a German actress and writer known for her autobiographical accounts of training in Japanese Zen Buddhism. In 1963, she traveled to Japan and trained in a Rinzai Zen monastery under Mumon Yamada.

== Early life ==
Ital was born in Hanover, Germany, into a musical family; her father was an orchestra conductor and her mother a lyric singer. She received musical training and later worked as an actress in Germany. Her performing career ended after she temporarily lost her voice due to a medical condition.

From 1928 onward, she pursued spiritual and academic studies, including Egyptology and Indology, while practicing forms of yoga and meditation.

== Zen training ==
Between 1953 and 1955, Ital studied with philosopher Eugen Herrigel. She was also in contact with Jesuit priest and Zen teacher Hugo Enomiya-Lassalle. She changed her name to Gerta at the Wilmersdorf district office on July 27, 1982. She left the Protestant Church in 1987.

In March 1963, she traveled to Japan and spent approximately seven months in Zen monastic training under Mumon Yamada, associated with the Myōshin-ji branch of the Rinzai school.

== Publications ==
Ital documented her experiences in autobiographical works originally published in German:

- Ital, Gerta (1966). Der Meister, die Mönche und ich: Im zenbuddhistischen Kloster. Munich: Otto Wilhelm Barth.
- Ital, Gerta (1966). Auf dem Weg zum Satori. Munich: Otto Wilhelm Barth.

English translations were published later under the titles:

- The Master, the Monks and I: A Western Woman's Experience of Zen
- On the Way to Satori: A Woman's Experience of Enlightenment

== Later life ==
After returning to Germany, Ital lectured and wrote on Zen Buddhism. She died on 21 July 1988 in Munich, Germany.
