= West Village (disambiguation) =

West Village is a neighborhood of New York City.

West Village may also refer to:

- West Village, Calgary, an area of Calgary, Alberta, Canada
- West Village, Dallas, an urban village in Dallas, Texas
- West Village, Detroit, an area of Detroit, Michigan
- West Village, Glamorgan, a location in Vale of Glamorgan, Wales
- West Village Historic District (Princeton, Massachusetts)
- West Village Historic District (Buffalo, New York)

== See also ==
- 西村 (disambiguation)
