= Buddhism and democracy =

The relationship between Buddhism and democracy has a long history with some scholars claiming the very foundations of Buddhist society were democratic. Though some historic Buddhist societies have been categorized as feudalistic, the relationship between peasants and land owners was often voluntary. Free-thinking Buddhist societies supported autonomy; peasants had mobility and could own land themselves. Currently countries claiming democracy with Buddhist state religions are Bhutan, Cambodia, Myanmar, and Sri Lanka.

== Modern views ==
The father of the Constitution of India and a pioneer of India's democracy, B. R. Ambedkar believed Buddhism to be a Democratic religion which led to his conversion and founding of the Navayana school of Buddhism. In an All-India Radio broadcast speech on 3 October 1954 Ambedkar declared:

Positively, my Social Philosophy, may be said to be enshrined in three words: Liberty, Equality and Fraternity. Let no one, however, say that I have borrowed my philosophy from the French Revolution. I have not. My philosophy has roots in religion and not in political science. I have derived them from the teachings of my Master, the Buddha. In his philosophy, liberty and equality had a place. [...] He gave the highest place to fraternity as the only real safeguard against the denial of liberty or equality or fraternity which was another name for brotherhood or humanity, which was again another name for religion.

Ambedkar also reminds of the existence of Democratic practices in Buddhist brotherhood.

"The Bhikshu Sangh had the most democratic constitution. He was only one of the Bhikkus. At the most he was like a prime minister among members of the Cabinet. He was never a dictator. Twice before his death he was asked to appoint someone as the head of the Sangh to control it. But each time he refused saying that the Dhamma is the Supreme Commander of the Sangha. He refused to be a dictator and refused to appoint a dictator".

14th Dalai Lama believes that both Buddhism and Democracy share a common viewpoint saying "not only are Buddhism and democracy compatible, they are rooted in a common understanding of the equality and potential of every individual." He believes that the ancient Sangha functioned democratically.

Mipham Chokyi Lodro, the 14th Shamar Rinpoche, wrote a book, Creating a Transparent Democracy, in 2006. Shamarpa proposes a transparent democracy where each citizen has self reliance and empowerment through a decentralized government system. Rather than a top-down control system, in which power flows down from national, to state to city, the system builds from village level up. Local units on the village level, combine to form the higher levels of government as well. The system relies on the banning of all propaganda, the dissolving of political parties and an education system that teaches competence in governance to all citizens. Transparency and self-reliance are indeed Buddhist values, but also universal... Where Shamarpa's proposal becomes distinctly Buddhist is his definition of the function of law. Protections are provided to the (1) Earth, natural environment, (2) human beings, and (3) animals. The Earth itself serves as the model for an ideal government, and it is the international community's responsibility to protect the natural environment.

David Kaczynski believes that Buddhism and Democracy need each other saying:

The ideal of democracy in the West, with its emphasis on process, inclusiveness and human dignity, is imbued with many of the qualities and insights of the dharma....Can there be a truly democratic politics without dharma in the broad sense? Is there anything more needed in public life than the dharma?

== History ==
=== Early Buddhism ===
The spread of Buddhism led to the spread of Democratic values throughout Asia. Kurt Kankan Spellmeyer stated Buddhism and Democracy have gone hand-in-hand since the beginning.

Links between the dharma and democracy have intrigued scholars for generations. Tribes like the Buddha’s could be found everywhere in the 6th century BCE, but the Shakyas stand out because their form of government strikingly resembles that of ancient Athens. According to Buddhist sources, the Shakya republic was governed from its capital, Kapilavasthu, by an assembly (the parishad) of five hundred citizens. Though not as large as the Athenian assembly (with its quorum of six thousand for major decisions), the Shakyan legislature needed an officer to manage the proceedings and so elected a raja, something like our Speaker of the House.

Egon Flaig concurs claiming that early Buddhist practices were an outgrowth from Gaṇasaṅgha-led city-states of ancient India. He describes them as "often governed by a council of nobles (sabha) made up of male aristocrats, ruling either on its own or with the help of an assembly (samiti)." Ajahn Brahm claims "the longest sustaining democracy in the world is the Buddhist sangha."

=== Mahāsammata ===
The Aggañña Sutta of the Pali Canon introduces a figure named "Mahāsammata" (Pali; lit. "the Great Elect") as the first monarch. The scripture elaborates on the formation of civilization that occurred with the adoption of ownership. As theft became a major societal concern, it was decided that a ruler should be elected to ensure the punishment of evil and preservation of righteousness.

Mahāsammata is also said to have been responsible for the establishment of caste and law.

=== Later Buddhism ===
German historian Markus Rüttermann has found in the 12th through the 14th centuries "several Japanese monasteries were making decisions by majority vote."

=== Tibetan Buddhism ===
After the 16th century in Tibet, Buddhist leaders were inseparable from government administrators. The concept of samayas, vows to the guru, became a tool for suppressing people's rights and manipulating political authority.

Shamar Rinpoche of the Karma Kagyu Lineage saw religion and politics as working against each other in Tibet. Lamas as a ruling class gave the country enduring structure and order, but as many people put unquestioning faith in their spiritual leaders, it left very little room for critical judgement of political decisions. These concerns were put forward by Shamarpa at a meeting in Varanasi India in 1998, called by the Dalai Lama. The meeting was attended by heads of Tibetan schools as an effort to better the future of Tibetans.

== See also ==
- Buddhist economics
- Buddhist socialism
- Engaged Buddhism
- Religious democracy
