= Sobin Yamada =

Japanese Zen Buddhist and abbot (1920–2008)

- Title: Roshi

Personal life
- Born: 1920 Japan
- Died: 2008 (aged 87–88)
- Education: Hanazono; Ryukoku University

Religious life
- Religion: Buddhism
- School: Rinzai

Sobin Yamada was the 26th abbot of Shinju-an, a subtemple of the Rinzai Zen temple of Daitoku-ji in Kyoto. Shinju-an is the memorial temple for Ikkyu. Yamada studied at Hanazono, a Rinzai university in Kyoto, and at Ryukoku University.

There is a calligraphic work by Yamada in the Asian Art Museum (San Francisco); it was commissioned by Yoshiko Kakudo for the museum.

Yamada was born in 1920 and died in 2008.

== Bibliography ==
- Zen at Daitoku-ji (1974), with Dr. Jon Carter Covell
- Unraveling Zen's Red Thread: Ikkyu's Controversial Way (1980), Dr. Jon Carter Covell and Abbot Sobin Yamada, 1980, HollyM International, Elizabeth, New Jersey, ISBN 0-930878-19-1

== See also ==
- Buddhism in Japan
- List of Rinzai Buddhists
