= Religious democracy =

Form of government

Religious democracy is a form of democracy where the values of a particular religion or state religion are preferred. The term applies to all democratic countries in which religion is incorporated into the form of government.

Democracies are characterized as secular or religious. The definition of democracy is disputed and interpreted differently amongst politicians and scholars. The religiosity of political leaders can also have an effect on the practice of democracy.

Some argue that religious democracies can be also be liberal democracies, such as religious liberalism.

== Historical ==
Historical democracies with state sponsored religious laws:

- Athenian democracy (Ancient Greek religion)
- Roman Republic (Ancient Roman religion)
- Hindu gaṇarājyas and Khap and Caste Panchayats
- Buddhist gaṇarājyas
- Icelandic Commonwealth (Norse paganism, after AD 1000 Christianity)
- Old Swiss Confederacy (Christianity)
- Kingdom of Nepal was once the world's only Hindu Kingdom during the monarch's rule but has ceased to be so following a declaration by the Parliament in 2006. The official religion of Nepal was Hinduism but in 2006 Nepal became democratic country and constitution declared it as a Secular state with freedom of religion is guaranteed by Constitution. During the rule of the Monarch, there was democratic rule, and for a brief time, a partyless religious democracy of the Panchayat (Nepal) system.

== Contemporary ==
Contemporary countries which claim to be democracies with state religions:

- Christian democracy:
  - Armenia, Costa Rica, Denmark, England, Greece, Hungary, Iceland, Liechtenstein, Malta, Monaco, Nicaragua, Norway, Samoa, Scotland, Tuvalu, Zambia
- Islamic democracy:
  - Algeria, Bangladesh, Djibouti, Egypt, Iraq, Iran, Jordan, Libya, Malaysia, Maldives, Mauritania, Morocco, Palestine, Pakistan, Somalia, Yemen
- Buddhism and democracy:
  - Bhutan, Cambodia, Myanmar, Sri Lanka

== Criticism ==
Major criticism of religious democracy include criticism from the secular and the legalist points of view.

- From the secular point of view, religion is a hindrance to democracy as it enforces a set of legal and societal principles. Separation of religion and state is required to protect freedom and ensure equality. As many countries, including the United States, incorporate religion into their legislation, it could be argued as to what constitutes a secular democracy.
- From the legal point of view, democracy can never enjoy general acceptance in a religious society. Anything outside of rigid interpretation of religious texts is rejected, and God rather than the people is sovereign.
- Conversion is a threat to diversity richness of a nation. It installs fear among the people of a particular community as they find their population shrinking due to conversion.

== See also ==
- Basic Laws of Israel
- Clash of Civilizations
- Cultural relativism
- Dialogue Among Civilizations
- Divine law
- Institute on Religion and Democracy
- Moral universalism
- Natural law
- Natural rights and legal rights
- Papal conclave
- State religion
- Theodemocracy
- Universal value
- Value pluralism
