= First Zen Institute of America =

Buddhist organization in New York City

Coordinates: 40.74436°N 73.98244°W

The First Zen Institute of America
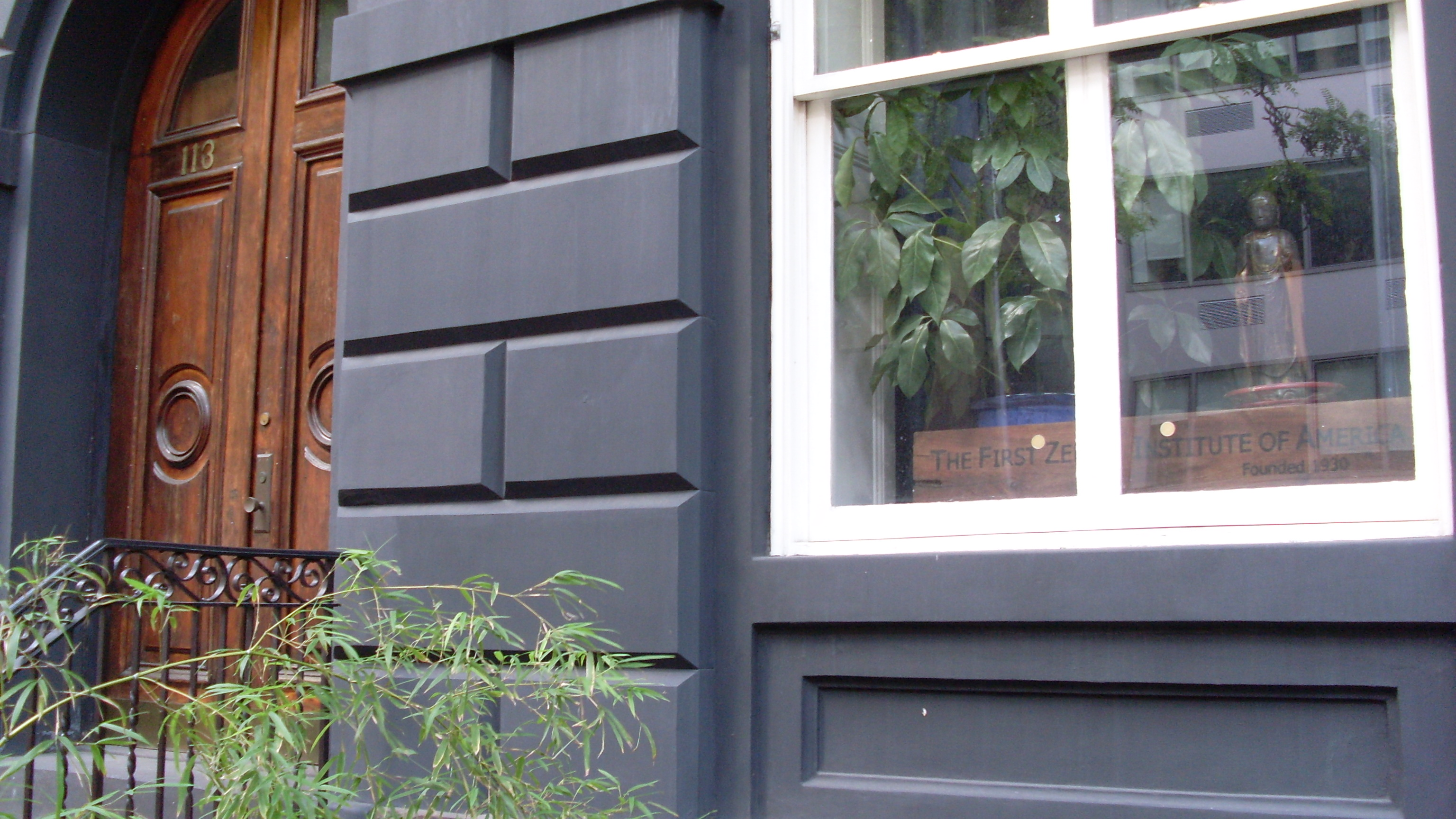

Religion
- Affiliation: Rinzai

Location
- Location: 113 E. 30th St. New York, NY 10016
- Country: United States
- Interactive map of The First Zen Institute of America

Architecture
- Founder: Sokei-an
- Completed: 1930

The First Zen Institute of America is a Rinzai institution for laypeople established by Sokei-an in New York, New York in 1930 as the Buddhist Society of America (changing its name after World War II). The emphasis on lay practice has its roots in the history of the organization. In 1875, the Japanese Rinzai Zen master Imakita Kosen founded a Zen institute, Ryomokyo-kai, dedicated to reviving Zen in Japan by recruiting talented and educated lay people. Kosen's most celebrated disciple, Soyen Shaku, visited America in 1893 to attend the World's Parliament of Religions in Chicago. In 1902 he returned to America where he lectured and taught briefly. Soyen Shaku assigned responsibility for this lay Zen institute to his heir, Sokatsu Shaku. The First Zen Institute's founder, Sokei-an, was Sokatsu's student and came to America with him in 1906 to establish a Zen community. When Sokatsu returned to Japan in 1910, Sokei-an remained to season his Zen and familiarize himself with the American character. After wandering across America and perfecting his English, Sokei-an made several trips back to Japan and in 1924 received credentials from Sokatsu as a Zen master.

== History of the First Zen Institute ==
In 1930, Sokei-an opened an American branch of Ryomokyo-kai in New York City and called it the Buddhist Society of America. Originally located on West 70th Street, today the First Zen Institute of America occupies a brownstone on East 30th Street. After Sokei-an died in 1945, the officers (George Fowler, president; Ruth Fuller Sasaki, vice president; and Mary Farkas, secretary) searched for a Japanese roshi who would go to New York to take up residence there. They particularly sought help from Goto Zuigan, Sokei-an's dharma brother. Ruth Sasaki went to Japan, in part to find a roshi who would return to New York with her. But it was not until 1955 that she was able to bring Miura Isshu back with her. Miura Roshi spent some time with the institute, exploring the possibility of becoming resident roshi, but felt uncomfortable working with female leadership, and sent a letter of resignation in November 1963. He continued to reside in New York and teach selected students on an independent basis until his death in 1976. The institute also had a branch in Kyoto, the First Zen Institute of America in Japan or Nichibei Daiichi Zen Kyokai, founded by Ruth Sasaki in 1957.

Poet Gary Snyder's study of Zen in Japan in 1956 was made possible by a grant from the First Zen Institute.

== Lectures and translations by Sokei-an Sasaki ==
Sokei-an died before leaving behind a Dharma heir, and the institute relies heavily upon the writings and transcriptions of its founder as a guide in its practice. Sokei-an described his way of teaching as "a direct transmission of Zen from soul to soul." Many of Sokei-an's early lectures were originally published from 1940 to 1941 in the magazine, Cat's Yawn, and subsequently published as the First Zen Institute's first book, also titled Cat's Yawn. Sokei-an spent many productive years teaching Zen in English, and translating and commenting on important Zen texts, including the Sutra of Perfect Awakening, The Platform Sutra of the Sixth Patriarch, and the Three Hundred Mile Tiger: The Record of Lin Chi. These have been published, almost in their entirety in the pages of Zen Notes, the First Zen Institute's quarterly publication. Collections of Sokei-an lectures have been published in The Zen Eye and Zen Pivots. His autobiography (as edited by Michael Hotz) has been published in Holding the Lotus to the Rock.

== Books published by the First Zen Institute ==
Continuing in the tradition of its founder, the members of the First Zen Institute have published many important original translations from classical Chinese and medieval Japanese texts. Books include Zen Dust, by Isshu Miura and Ruth Fuller Sasaki, The Zen Koan, by Isshu Miura and Ruth Fuller Sasaki, Zen A Religion; A Method For Religious Awakening; Study for Foreigners in Japan, by Ruth Fuller Sasaki; The Development of Chinese Zen After the Sixth Patriarch, by Heinreich Dumulin and Ruth Fuller Sasaki; A Man of Zen, The Recorded Sayings of the Layman P'ang, translated from the Chinese by Ruth Fuller Sasaki, Yoshitaka Iriya and Dana R. Fraser; The Record of Lin Chi, translated from the Chinese by Ruth Fuller Sasaki; Bankei Zen, translations from the Record of Bankei, by Peter Haskel; Letting Go, The Story of Zen Master Tosui, translated and with an introduction by Peter Haskel; Great Fool: Zen Master Ryokan, Poems, Letters, and other Writings, translated with Essays by Ryuichi Abe and Peter Haskel, and Zen by the Brush, by Susan Morningstar. Manuscripts awaiting publication include the Platform Sutra of the Sixth Patriarch, Three Hundred Mile Tiger: The Record of Lin Chi and Peter Haskel's new book on the Zen sword-master Takuan.

== Ongoing practice at the First Zen Institute ==
Despite having no teacher in residence, the institute does invite teachers such as Kyozan Joshu Sasaki Roshi and Isshu Miura Roshi to provide instruction periodically. The institute holds public meditation once a week on Wednesday evenings, 7:30-9:30 p.m. and offers two-day meditation retreats, usually on the second weekend of each month."

== See also ==
- Buddhism in the United States
- Mary Farkas
- Timeline of Zen Buddhism in the United States
