= Gisan Zenrai =

Gisan Zenrai (儀山 善来; 1802–1878) was a Zen Master in 19th century Japan. He taught at Sōgen-ji 曹源寺 in Okayama. The most famous story about him concerns his conversation in 1837 with the disciple cooling his bath: this is given in an abbreviated version in Zen Flesh, Zen Bones, and in more expanded version in other sources. The Zen Flesh, Zen Bones version is:

"A Zen master name Gisan asked a young student to bring him a pail of water to cool his bath.
"The student brought the water and, after cooling the bath, threw on to the ground the little that was left over.
"'You dunce!' the master scolded him. 'Why didn't you give the rest of the water to the plants? What right have you to waste even a drop of water in this temple?'
The young student attained Zen in that instant. He changed his name to Tekisui Giboku (1822—1899), which means a drop of water."

Gisan was also the teacher of masters Imakita Kōsen, Ekkei Shuken, Daisetsu Joen, and Ogino Dokuen.
