= Mary Farkas =

- Title: Director

Personal life
- Born: 1911 United States
- Died: June 7, 1992 (aged 81) New York, New York

Religious life
- Religion: Zen Buddhism
- School: Rinzai

Senior posting
- Teacher: Sokei-an
- Based in: First Zen Institute of America
- Website: www.firstzen.org

Mary Farkas (1911 – June 7, 1992) was the director of the First Zen Institute of America (FZIA), running the center's administrative functions for many years following the death of her teacher (Sokei-an) in 1945. Though she was not a teacher of Zen Buddhism in any traditional sense of the word, she did help to carry on the lineage of Sokei-an and also was editor of the FZIA's journal, Zen Notes, starting with Volume 1 in 1954. Additionally, she also edited books about Sokei-an, i.e. "The Zen Eye" and "Zen Pivots." Through her transcriptions of his talks, the institute was able to continue on the lineage without having a formal teacher (Sokei-an left no Dharma heir).

== Bibliography ==
- Sasaki, Shigetsu; Farkas, Mary; Lopez, Robert (1998). Zen Pivots: Lectures on Buddhism and Zen. Weatherhill. ISBN 0-8348-0416-6. OCLC 38120661.
- Sasaki, Shigetsu; Farkas, Mary (1993). The Zen Eye: A Collection of Zen Talks by Sokei-an. Weatherhill. ISBN 0-8348-0272-4. OCLC 27266361.

== See also ==
- Buddhism in the United States
- List of Rinzai Buddhists
- Timeline of Zen Buddhism in the United States
