= Ruth Fuller Sasaki =

American Zen Buddhist (1892–1967)

Ruth Fuller Sasaki (October 31, 1892 – October 24, 1967), born Ruth Fuller, was an American writer and Buddhist teacher. She was important figure in the development of Buddhism in the United States. As Ruth Fuller Everett (during her first marriage), she met and studied with Daisetz Teitaro Suzuki in Japan in 1930. In 1938, she became a principal supporter of the Buddhist Society of America (later known as the First Zen Institute of America), in New York. She married Sokei-an, the Zen priest in residence there, in 1944, but he died within a year. In 1949, she went to Kyoto to find another roshi to live and teach in New York, to complete translations of key Zen texts, and to pursue her own Zen training, receiving sanzen from Gotō Zuigan.

She stayed in Kyoto for most of the rest of her life, becoming in 1958 the first foreigner to be a priest of a Rinzai Zen temple, and the only westerner, and the only woman, yet to be a priest of a Daitoku-ji temple. She was careful to record, however, that she did not perform the usual duties of a priest, "because I was a foreigner, a woman, untrained in temple procedures, and because I needed the years left me to carry on the work of spreading Zen to the west."

Sasaki was instrumental in the translations into English of many Zen texts. One of the most important was Zen dust; the history of the koan and koan study in Rinzai (Lin-chi) Zen, published in 1966 by her own First Zen Institute. In 2006, Gary Snyder wrote, "Her writings from the sixties were ahead of their time and remain accurate and relevant."

== Early life and developing interest in Eastern religions ==
Ruth Fuller was born and grew up in Chicago, and enjoyed wealth and privilege. She took piano lessons in Switzerland for several months in 1913, and also studied French and German with private tutors in Europe for a year and a half. In 1917, she married Edward Warren Everett, a trial attorney twenty years older than herself. At the end of 1918, a daughter was born, Eleanor. From 1938 to 1948, Eleanor was married to writer and Zen philosopher Alan Watts.

In 1923–24, Ruth and Eleanor went to the Clarkstown Country Club in Nyack, New York, for rest and healing. This resort was led by Pierre Bernard, and offered adult education in yoga and Eastern philosophy and religions. Then from 1927 to 1929, she studied Sanskrit and Indian philosophy at the University of Chicago.

== First trips to Asia ==
On a 1930 family sojourn to East Asia, Ruth met D. T. Suzuki, who gave her basic instruction for meditation, and told her that the best way to learn about Zen would be to return to Japan for an extended stay. Back in the US, she kept up a meditation practice and a correspondence with Suzuki. In 1932, she returned to Japan, arriving April 1. Suzuki introduced her to Nanshinken Roshi (Kono Mukai) of the Rinzai Zen monastery in Kyoto at Nanzen-ji, and she became his student. At first, she sat in the roshi's small private temple, because she was not allowed in the zendo. Six days a week, she rose at 5am, did zazen until 7am, had breakfast, went to Nanzen-ji, did zazen there all day, returned home for supper and a bath, and did more zazen at home until midnight. Nanshinken gave her a koan, and Suzuki acted as interpreter between roshi and student. After a month, she began to sit in the zendo, where the monks, originally resistant, soon welcomed her presence. She was back in the US in the summer. Decades later, she referred to those months at Nanzen-ji as "the most completely satisfactory time I have ever had in my life."

== Kyoto research team ==
She gathered together and employed a small team to study and do translation work under her leadership, and under the banner of the First Zen Institute of America in Japan (or Nichibei Daiichi Zen Kyokai, founded in 1957.). Her headquarters was Ryosen-an, a subtemple within Daitoku-ji. Most of the team had other, full-time jobs, and did work in this team part-time. One of the main projects of the team was to produce a translation of the Record of Rinzai (or Rinzai-roku, or Record of Linji, or Lin-chi Lu), a classic text of sayings of the founder of Rinzai. Sasaki originally planned to use translations made by her deceased husband, Sokei-an, and recorded by his students in New York, but the researchers found these translations inadequate.

The director of the team was Iriya Yoshitaka (1910–1999), who was considered the world's foremost authority on colloquial Chinese of the Tang and Song dynasties. He taught at Kyoto University, and eventually became Head of the Department of Chinese Literature at Nagoya University.

English professor Kanaseki Hisao (1918–1996) was on the team, as well as Yokoi (later Yanagida) Seizan (1922-2006), who taught at Kyoto University and later was president of Hanazono University. Yampolsky wrote in 1991 that Yanagida "is recognized as the foremost scholar of Zen Buddhism in both China and Japan."

Three Americans were on the team: Burton Watson, Philip Yampolsky, and Gary Snyder. (Sasaki sponsored Snyder's first trip to Japan.) They were also joined by Walter Nowick, a pianist and member of the First Zen Institute, to work on the Record of Rinzai.

Between 1959 and 1963, the Institute published several small pamphlets, including Zen: A Religion, Zen: A Method for Religious Awakening, Rinzai Zen Study for Foreigners in Japan, The First Zen Institute of America in Japan, Ryosen-an Zendo Practice, and The Wooden Fish: Basic Sutras and Gathas of Rinzai Zen.

This group was dealt a blow in August 1961, when she dismissed Yampolsky (whom she accused of stealing the team's translation of the Rinzai-roku to publish it as his own), and Watson and Snyder resigned in protest. This may be considered the culmination of a long-standing tension between Sasaki's authority as an employer with an autocratic style, and the scholarly authority of members of the team. The three Japanese scholars continued to work on Zen Dust for her. Zen Dust was finally published, first in Japan in 1966, then in the US the following year. It was preceded by Zen Koan, a four hundred page shorter edition in 1965. The Record of Rinzai was published after Sasaki's death, in 1975, as The Record of Lin-chi, but without Iriya's notes or Yanagida's introduction.

== Ryosen-an zendo ==
At Ryosen-an, a subtemple just inside the northern boundary of Daitoku-ji, Fuller Sasaki maintained a small but beautiful zendo (a hall where people could practice zazen, or sitting meditation) named Zuiun-ken, which had room for about 15 people. Only Westerners (no Japanese) practiced zazen here. Each person sat on a padded cushion on a raised platform for about 25 minutes. Then there was a bell. Everyone stood up, walked slowly (kinhin) around the outside of the hall, then returned to sit 25 more minutes. After four sittings (two hours), there was a brief period of chanting, before the sitters returned home. The zendo was full for most of each summer. Many Westerners first learned how to practice zazen in this zendo.

== Final years ==
Sasaki continued to do her utmost to complete as many of her long-standing projects as possible, amidst deteriorating health in her last years. She collapsed from exhaustion while in Europe to deal with European publishers. She was at Ryosen-an when she died of a heart attack on October 24, 1967.

== Bibliography ==
- Miura, Isshu. Zen Dust; the History of the Koan and Koan Study in Rinzai (Lin-chi) Zen (1966) First Zen Institute of America in Japan. ASIN B0006BZGV6
- Miura, Isshu; Sasaki, Ruth Fuller. The Zen Koan: Its History and Use in Rinzai Zen (1965) Harcourt, Brace & World. ASIN B0007DZHDA
- Sasaki, Ruth Fuller; Iriya, Yoshitaka; Fraser, Dana. The Recorded Sayings of Layman P'Ang: a Ninth-Century Zen Classic (1971) Weatherhill.
- Sasaki, Ruth F. The Record of Lin-chi (1975) Institute for Zen Studies. ASIN B000K11XXW
