= Oda Sessō =

Japanese Buddhist monk (1901–1966)

- Title: Rōshi

Personal life
- Born: 1901 Japan
- Died: September 16, 1966 (aged 64–65)

Religious life
- Religion: Zen Buddhism
- School: Rinzai

Senior posting
- Predecessor: Gotō Zuigan
- Successor: Morinaga Sōkō

Oda Sessō (小田 雪窓, 1901 – 16 September 1966) was a Rinzai Rōshi and abbot of the Daitoku-ji (大徳寺) in Kyoto, Japan, a Dharma successor of Gotō Zuigan. He was elected abbot of Daitoku-ji upon Goto's retirement from that post in 1955. At Goto's request, Oda opened Daitoku-ji to foreigners. His western students included Gary Snyder, Janwillem van de Wetering, Irmgard Schloegl, and Philip Yampolsky.

Snyder described him as:

[T]he subtlest and most perceptive man I've ever met... His teisho were inaudible, his voice was so soft. Yet as one of the head monks at Daitoku-ji Sodo said much later, 'Those lectures of Oda Rōshi we couldn't hear I am beginning to hear today.'

Alan Watts said:

[H]aving a conversation with him is like dropping a pebble in a well and never hearing it drop. The soundless pebble in the bottomless well.

Janwillem van de Wetering gave an account of his stay at Daitoku-ji in his book The Empty Mirror: Experiences in a Japanese Zen Monastery.

== See also ==
- Buddhism in Japan
- List of Rinzai Buddhists

== Sources ==
- Kraft, Kenneth; Morinaga, Sōkō. Zen, Tradition and Transition (1988) Grove Press. ISBN 0-8021-3162-X.
- Kyger, Joanne. Strange Big Moon: The Japan and India Journals: 1960–1964 (2000) North Atlantic Books. ISBN 978-1-55643-337-5.
- Snyder, Gary. The Real Work: Interviews & Talks, 1964–1979 (1980) New Directions Publishing. ISBN 0-8112-0761-7.
- Stirling, Isabel. Zen Pioneer: The Life and Works of Ruth Fuller Sasaki (2006) Shoemaker & Hoard. ISBN 978-1-59376-110-3.
