= Zen Centre =

Buddhist temple in London

Coordinates: 51°32′2″N 0°10′57″W

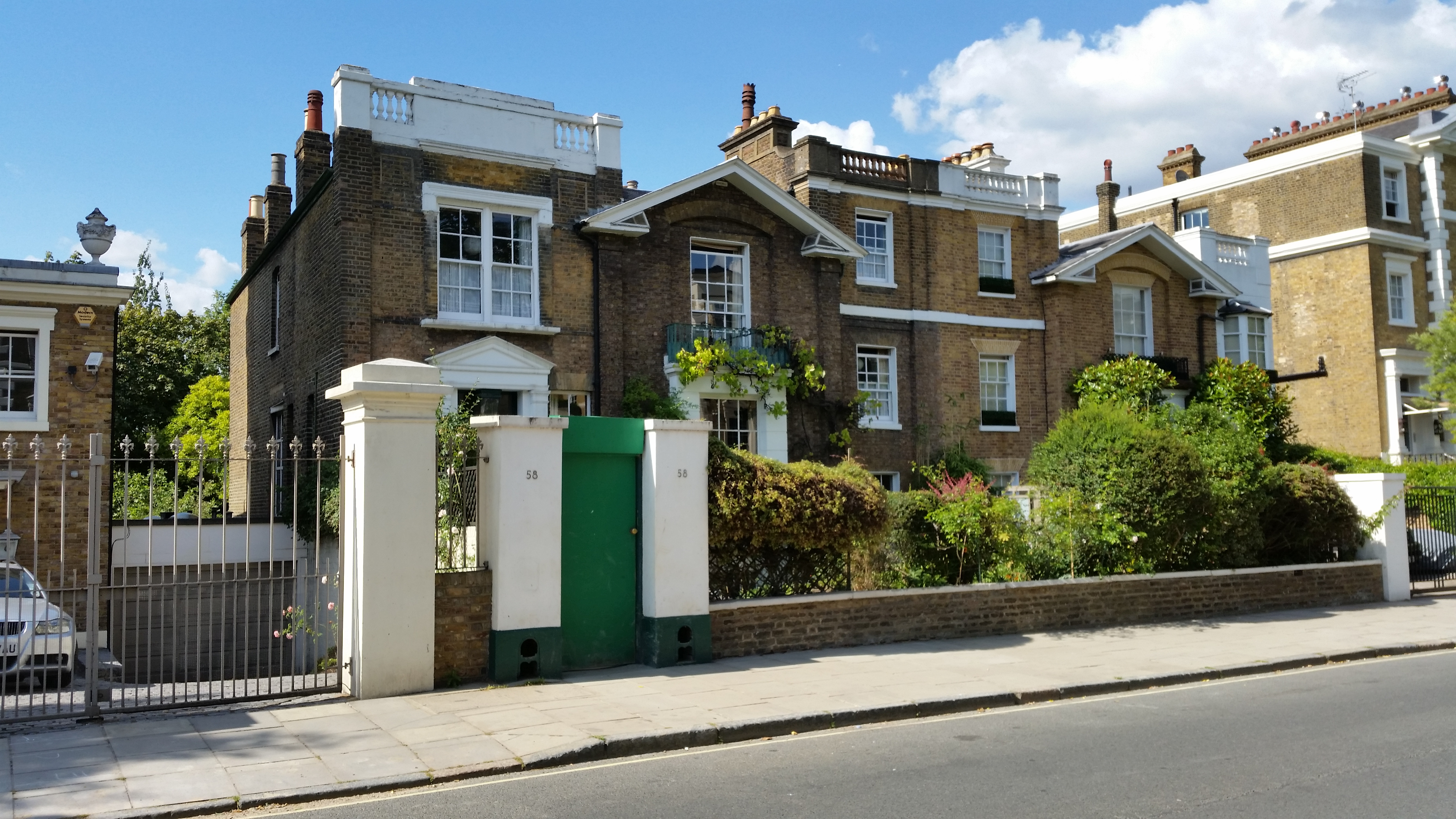
Zen Centre, St. John's Wood, London

The Zen Centre is a Buddhist temple in London, England, and the active arm of the Zen Trust, whose object is to promote the Zen Buddhist religion for the benefit of the public. Members generally attend its meetings at the premises of the Buddhist Society. Attendance at Zen Centre premises is for select invitees only. The Zen Centre was founded by Christmas Humphreys, who also founded The Buddhist Society and was led by the Venerable Myokyo-ni until her death in 2007.

It has two law properties: Shobo-an ('Hermitage of the True Dharma') at 58 Marlborough Place, St John's Wood, London; and Fairlight in Luton, together valued at £2,240,000 in the Zen Trust's 2005 accounts lodged with the Charity Commission.

Shobo-an was formerly Christmas Humphreys' home and was left by him to the Zen Centre on his death in 1983. It was inaugurated as temple on 23 July 1984.

The purchase of Fairlight was financed largely using a single legacy from a lay devotee. It was acquired in a state of considerable disrepair from Luton District Council in 1995, and was improved by volunteers of the Zen Centre. The Venerable Myokyo-ni moved to Fairlight in 2002 and lived there until her death in 2007.

== See also ==
- Buddhist Society
