= Nishimura =

Nishimura (written: 西村) is the 46th most common Japanese surname. Notable people with the surname include:

- Akihiro Nishimura (politician) (born 1960), Japanese politician of the Liberal Democratic Party
- Akihiro Nishimura (footballer) (born 1958), Japanese retired football player
- Akira Nishimura (born 1953), Japanese composer
- Aori Nishimura (born 2001), Japanese skateboarder
- Ayaka Nishimura (born 1989), Japanese field hockey player
- Chinami Nishimura (voice actress) (born 1970), Japanese voice actress
- Chinami Nishimura (politician) (born 1967), Japanese politician of the Democratic Party of Japan
- Eshin Nishimura (born 1933), Japanese Rinzai Zen Buddhist priest and former president of Hanazono University
- Hiroki Nishimura (born 1994), Japanese cyclist
- Hiroyuki Nishimura (born 1976), Japanese internet entrepreneur, founder of the Japanese textboard 2channel and current administrator of 4chan
- Junji Nishimura (born 1955), Japanese animation director and producer
- Ken Nishimura (born 1995), Japanese karateka
- Kentaro Nishimura (born 1985), Japanese Nippon Professional Baseball player
- Kō Nishimura (1923–1997), Japanese actor
- Kodo Nishimura (born 1989), Japanese Buddhist monk and makeup artist
- Koichi Nishimura (born 1973), Japanese volleyball player
- Koji Nishimura (born 1984), Japanese football player
- Kokichi Nishimura (1919–2015), Japanese soldier and businessman
- Kokū Nishimura (1915–2002), Japanese master shakuhachi player, teacher, and craftsman
- Kyotaro Nishimura (1930–2022), Japanese novelist
- Masahiko Nishimura (born 1960), Japanese theatre and film actor
- Motoki Nishimura (born 1947), Japanese judoka
- Osamu Nishimura (1971–2025), Japanese professional wrestler
- Riki Nishimura (born 2005), Japanese K-pop idol of the group Enhypen
- Seiji Nishimura (born 1956), Japanese karateka
- Nishimura Shigeki (1828–1902), educator and leader of the Meiji Enlightenment
- Shingo Nishimura (born 1948), Japanese politician
- Shōgorō Nishimura (born 1930), Japanese film director
- Shoichi Nishimura (1912–1998), Japanese footballer and manager
- Shoji Nishimura (1889–1944), admiral in the Imperial Japanese Navy during World War II
- Sou Nishimura (born 1936), Japanese manga artist
- Subaru Nishimura (born 2003), Japanese footballer
- Takuma Nishimura (1899–1951), general in the Imperial Japanese Army during World War II
- Takuro Nishimura (born 1977), Japanese football player
- Tomohiro Nishimura (born 1961), Japanese voice actor, actor, and singer-songwriter
- Tomomichi Nishimura (born 1946), Japanese voice actor
- Trina Nishimura (born 1983), American voice actress
- Yasufumi Nishimura (born 1999), Japanese footballer
- Yasutoshi Nishimura (born 1962), Japanese politician of the Liberal Democratic Party
- Yoshihiro Nishimura (born 1967), Japanese screenwriter, film director, special effects and makeup effects artist
- Yoshitaka Nishimura (born 1982), Japanese composer
- Yuichi Nishimura (born 1972), Japanese football referee
- Yukie Nishimura (born 1967), Japanese pianist

== See also ==
- 6306 Nishimura, a main-belt asteroid
- C/2023 P1 (Nishimura), a comet
- Nishimura's catalyst, a hydrogenation catalyst named in honor of chemist Shigeo Nishimura
