= Shodo Harada =

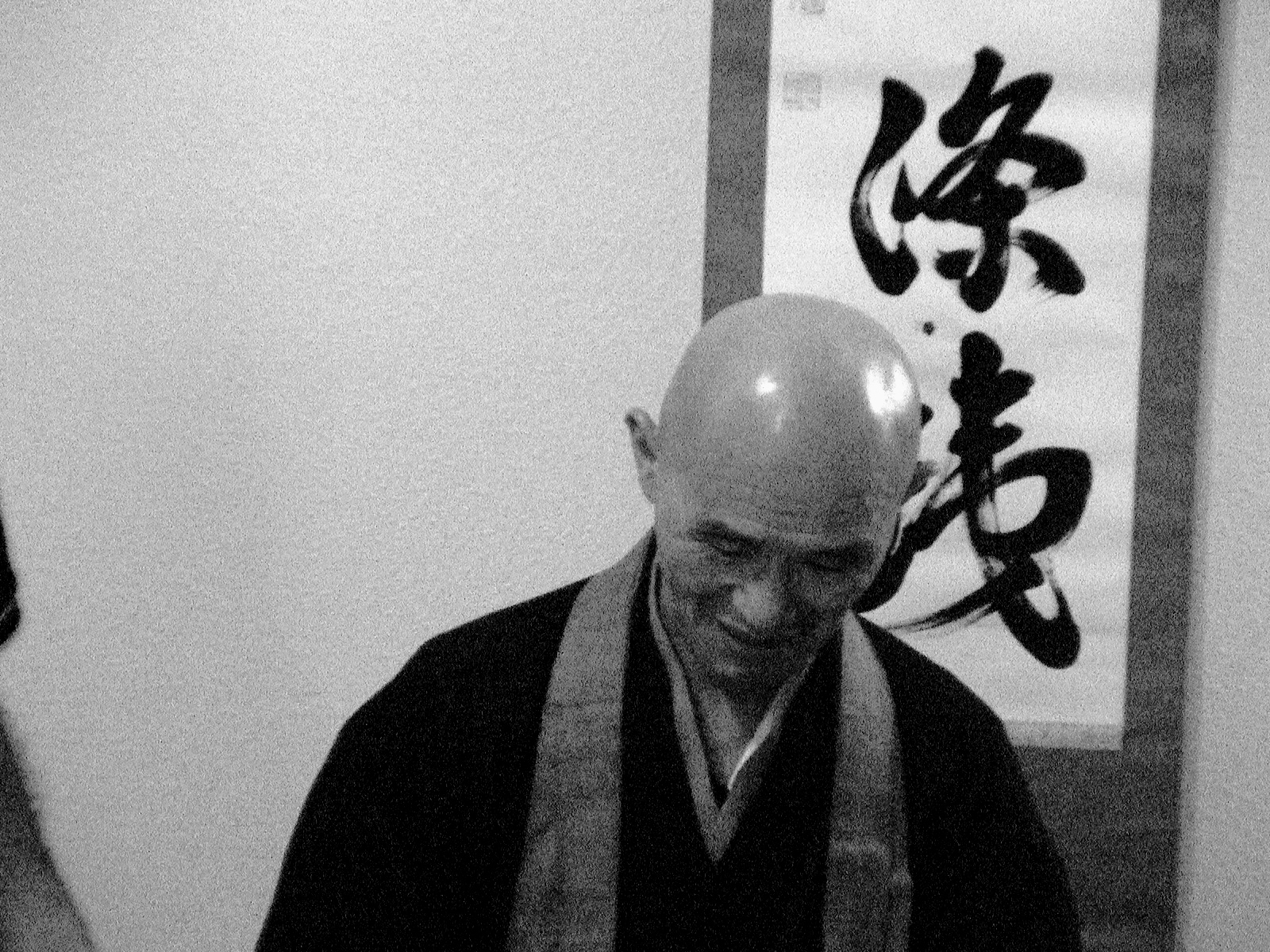
- Title: Rōshi

Personal life
- Born: Nara, Japan
- Education: Hanaozono Buddhist University Kyoto
- Other name: Harada Roshi

Religious life
- Religion: Zen Buddhism
- School: Rinzai
- Dharma name: Taigen Shodo

Senior posting
- Based in: Sogenji Okayama Japan
- Predecessor: Mumon Yamada

Military service
- Website: https://onedropzen.net/

Shodo Harada (原田 正道, Harada Shōdō; born 26 August 1940), or Harada Rōshi, is a Rinzai priest, author, calligrapher, and head abbot of Sōgen-ji — a three-hundred-year-old temple in Okayama, Japan. He has become known as a "teacher of teachers", with masters from various lineages coming to sit sesshin with him in Japan or during his trips to the United States and Europe.

== Biography ==
Shodo Harada was born into a Zen temple Aug. 26, 1940 in Nara, Japan. While still in high school, he encountered his teacher, Mumon Yamada, while running an errand for his father to Myōshin-ji. He was impressed by how little he knew of Buddhism at this encounter. After college he entered Shofukuji and began his training in 1962 under Rinzai Zen master and Japanese calligrapher Mumon Yamada, from whom he received Dharma transmission in 1982.

In 1982 he was sent by Mumon to Sogen-ji to help an elderly abbot tend to the building and training schedules, which is the main of the four pillars where he is still teaching now.

In September 1989, Harada came to the United States to provide instruction for students and in 1995 founded Tahoma Sogenji Zen Monastery on Whidbey Island in Island County, Washington, where the practice mirrors the practices found at Sogen-ji. This is the second pillar. The third pillar being Indozan Sogenji near the town of Adilabad in Telangana state, central India. Harada Roshi leads a sesshin in Indozan once every August. The fourth pillar is Hokuozan Sogenji in Asendorf, Germany, being the central place for the many One Drop groups all over Europe. ShoE Roshi is in residence there. Harada Roshi is leading sesshins 3-4 times a year in Hokuozan.

Nearby the Tahoma One Drop Monastery, Harada has opened a hospice known as Enso House in 2001.

Among those Western teachers that study with Harada Roshi are Hogen Bays, Jan Chozen Bays, Mitra Bishop, Alan Hozan Senauke, and Paul Haller.

Roshi flew to the United States to perform the Jukai ceremony of Damien Echols. Echols (a member of the West Memphis Three) was wrongly convicted of the 1993 murders of three eight-year-old boys in West Memphis, Arkansas. Whilst in prison, Echols began practicing Buddhism.

== Bibliography ==
- Harada, Shodo (1993). Morning Dewdrops of the Mind: Teachings of a Contemporary Zen Master. Frog Books. ISBN 1-883319-10-2. OCLC 28183680.
- Harada, Shodo; Jane Lago; Priscilla Daichi Storandt (2000). The Path to Bodhidharma: Teachings of Shodo Harada Roshi. Tuttle Publishing. ISBN 0-8048-3216-1. OCLC 43615614.
- Harada, Shodo; Tim Jundo Williams & Jane Shotaku Lago (eds.); Priscilla Daichi Storandt (translator) (2011). Moon by the Window: The Calligraphy and Zen Insights of Shodo Harada. Wisdom Publications. ISBN 978-0861716487.
- Harada, Shodo; Jane Shotaku Lago; Priscilla Daichi Storandt (2018). Not One Single Thing: A Commentary on the Platform Sutra. Wisdom Publications. ISBN 978-1614291145. OCLC 975365202.

== See also ==
- Buddhism in Japan
- List of Rinzai Buddhists
- Timeline of Zen Buddhism in the United States
