= Janwillem van de Wetering =

Dutch writer (1931–2008)

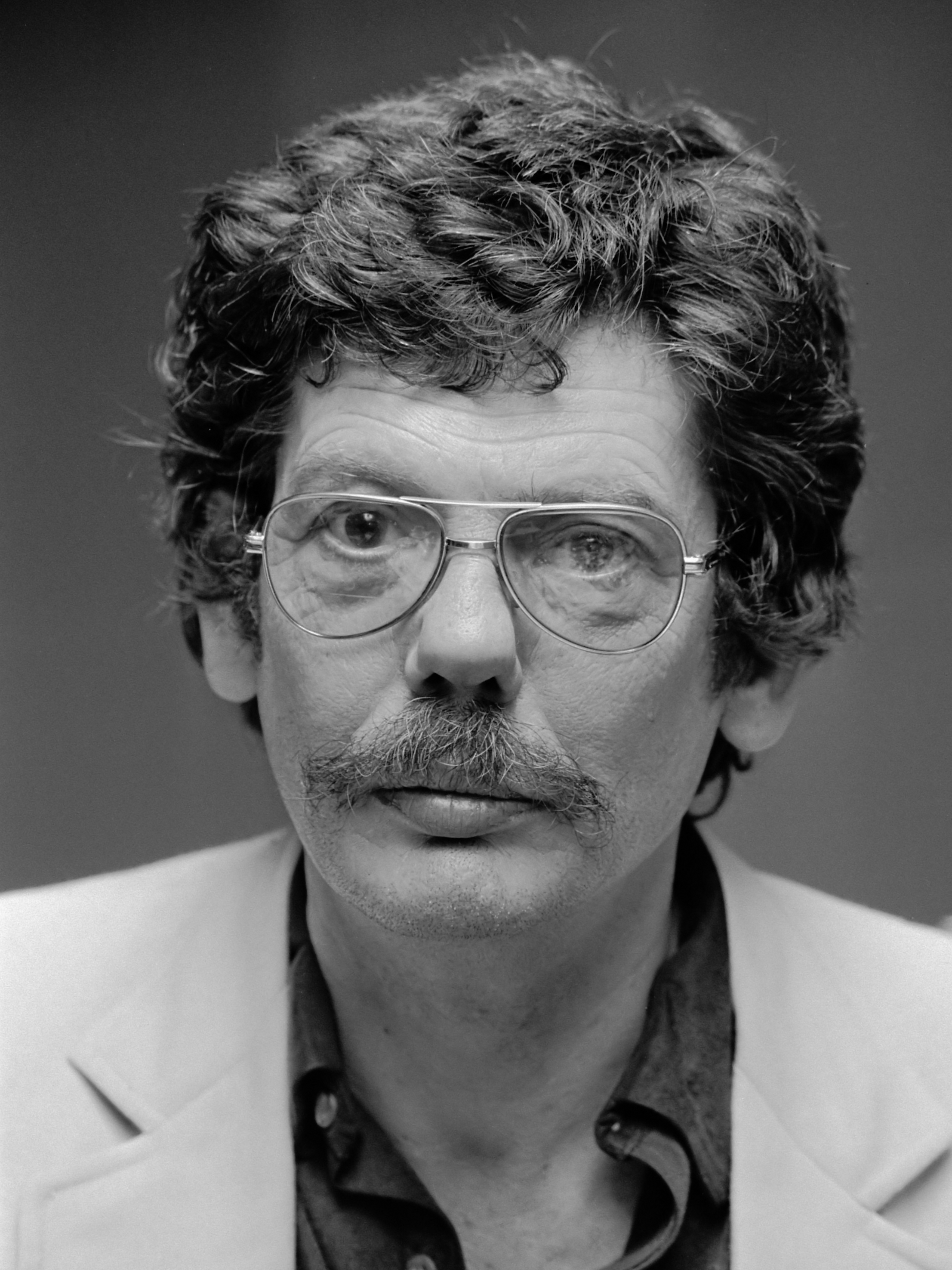
- Van de Wetering in 1982
- Born: Jan Willem Lincoln van de Wetering; February 12, 1931; Rotterdam, Netherlands
- Died: July 4, 2008 (aged 77); Blue Hill, Maine, USA
- Awards: Grand Prix de Littérature Policière (1984)

Jan Willem Lincoln van de Wetering (February 12, 1931 – July 4, 2008) was a Dutch author who wrote a number of works in Dutch and English. His publications spanned detective fiction, children's books and Zen philosophy.

== Biography ==
Van de Wetering was born and raised in Rotterdam, as the son of a rich businessman who dealt in a wide variety of commodities. In later years he lived in South Africa, Japan, London, Colombia, Peru, Australia, Amsterdam and in Surry, Maine, the setting of two of his Grijpstra and de Gier novels and his children's series about the porcupine "Hugh Pine".

Van de Wetering studied Zen under the guidance of Oda Sessō, together with Walter Nowick, at Daitoku-ji in Kyoto. Van de Wetering lived a year in Daitoku-ji and half a year with Nowick outside the temple, and described his experiences in his book The Empty Mirror. The book includes an account of a visit to the monastery by Hugo Enomiya-Lassalle, describing his own mixed thoughts about this representative of what he deemed an old-fashioned religion. He wrote the first draft in 1958, and the second draft in the summer of 1960, but only wrote the book that was published in 10 days in 1970. Sōkō Morinaga, Walter Nowick's Dharma brother, wrote in Novice to Master about traditional practices at that time.

Toleration leads to friendship. Friendship always wins. There has never been a Buddhist war

— The Empty Mirror: Experiences in a Japanese Zen Monastery, p. 74.

Van de Wettering also encountered American poet and author Gary Snyder (referred to in The Empty Mirror as "Gerald") during his time at Daitoku-ji. Snyder was also studying under abbot Oda Sesso Roshi at that time.

His many travels, and his experiences in a Zen Buddhist monastery and as a member of the Amsterdam Reserve Constabulary ("being a policeman in one's spare time" as he phrased it in his introduction to Outsider in Amsterdam) lend some authenticity to his works of fiction and non-fiction.

Van de Wetering was awarded the French Grand Prix de Littérature Policière in 1984 for his novel Maine Massacre. He died in Blue Hill, Maine, aged 77.

== Bibliography ==
Van de Wetering was particularly noted for his detective fiction, his most popular creations being Grijpstra and de Gier, a pair of Amsterdam police officers who figure in a lengthy series of novels and short stories. Most of the mysteries are rich with images from Amsterdam, where most of them take place; some also feature a cat: in earlier novels, one named Oliver; in later novels, a female named Tabriz. He also wrote stories for children and nonfiction works. He usually wrote in Dutch and then in English.

=== Grijpstra and de Gier novels ===
Adjutant-Detective Henk Grijpstra and Detective-Sergeant Rinus de Gier, along with their never-named elderly superior, the Commissaris, are the most popular creations of Janwillem van de Wetering. They are police detectives in the Murder Brigade of the Amsterdam Municipal Police, and are featured in fourteen detective novels and several short stories published in Ellery Queen's Mystery Magazine and Alfred Hitchcock's Mystery Magazine.

Grijpstra, heavy, middle-aged, and less than happily married, is the senior partner of the duo. Though he was raised in Amsterdam, he is a Frisian (from Friesland, a northern area of the Netherlands) born in the port city of Harlingen. In his youth he dreamed of becoming a jazz musician or a painter. When a set of drums mysteriously appeared in police headquarters he appropriated them.

De Gier, a younger man with deep brown eyes and curly hair, and most-often sporting a tasteful denim suit, is single, handsome, and very successful with women. He is an avowed bachelor and dedicated to his cats. He is a dreamer and a deep thinker, often pondering aloud on "the void," Zen, and life. A native of Rotterdam, de Gier is, like Grijpstra, an amateur musician. He often carries a small flute, and in odd moments he and Grijpstra improvise together in their office, where Grijpstra has his set of drums.

The Commissaris, small, elderly, and often nearly incapacitated by chronic rheumatism, supervises the partners' field investigations. Intelligent and broadly experienced, he often provides key insights into his juniors' cases, as well as philosophical commentary. A Frisian like Grijpstra, the Commissaris is fond of jenever and small cigars. Only his first name, Jan, is ever mentioned.

Grijpstra, de Gier, and the Commissaris first appeared in the novel Outsider in Amsterdam. The novels (in both publishing order and internal chronological order) are:

1. Outsider in Amsterdam (1975)
2. Tumbleweed (1976)
3. The Corpse on the Dike (1976)
4. Death of a Hawker (1977)
5. The Japanese Corpse (1977)
6. The Blond Baboon (1978)
7. The Maine Massacre (1979)
8. The Mind-Murders (1981)
9. The Streetbird (1983)
10. The Rattle-Rat (1985)
11. Hard Rain (1986)
12. Just a Corpse at Twilight (1994)
13. The Hollow-Eyed Angel (1996)
14. The Perfidious Parrot (1997)

A complete anthology of short stories, The Amsterdam Cops: Collected Stories, was published in 1999, replacing two earlier anthologies, The Sergeant's Cat and Other Stories and The Amsterdam Cops and Other Stories. (The latter has also been published, confusingly, under the title The Sergeant's Cat, with some stories taken from the earlier collection of that title.)

=== Children's books ===
- Little Owl, 1978
- Hugh Pine, 1980
- Hugh Pine and the Good Place, 1981
- Hugh Pine and Something Else, 1983
- Eugen Eule und der Fall des verschwundenen Flohs, 2001 (in German)

=== Other fiction ===
- The Butterfly Hunter, 1982
- Bliss and Bluster, 1982
- Inspector Saito's Small Satori, 1985 (collection)
- Murder by Remote Control, 1986 (graphic novel, with Paul Kirchner)
- Seesaw Millions, 1988
- Mangrove Mama and Other Tropical Tales of Terror, 1995 (anthology)
- Judge Dee Plays His Lute: A Play and Selected Mystery Stories, 1997 (anthology; includes the original play Judge Dee Plays his Lute and a selection of uncollected short stories)
- Die entartete Seezunge, 2004 (inspired by the World War 2 bombing of Rotterdam and the 9/11 disaster in NYC) (a novel in German, appeared as an article in Dutch)

=== Non-fiction ===
- The Empty Mirror: Experiences in a Japanese Zen Monastery, 1971
- A Glimpse of Nothingness: Experiences in an American Zen Community, 1975
- De doosjesvuller en andere vondsten (The boxfiller and other findings), 1984 (essays in Dutch)
- Waar zijn we aan begonnen? (What have we started?), 1985 (essays in Dutch on the stages of life with the psychologist Hans van Rappard)
- Robert Van Gulik: His Life, His Work, 1988
- Afterzen: Experiences of a Zen Student out on His Ear, 1999

=== Articles/stories not included in books ===
- "Astral Bodies and Tantric Sex." The New York Times, January 10, 1988. (review of a two-volume biography of Alexandra David-Néel)
- "The Way Life Should Be - Maine: coastline on a clean, cold sea." The Nation, September 1, 2003.

=== Translations ===
- Alexandra David-Néel and Lama Yongden: The Power of Nothingness. Boston: Houghton Mifflin, 1982 (French to English, with an introduction by the translator)
- Van de Wetering translated many books from English to Dutch and two books from French to Dutch.

== Filmography ==
- Grijpstra & De Gier (Netherlands, 1979), based on the novel Outsider in Amsterdam, script by Wim Verstappen
- Rattlerat (Netherlands, 1987), script by Wim Verstappen
- Der blonde Affe (Germany, 1999), based on the novel The Blond Baboon

== Television ==
- A TV series based on the Grijpstra and de Gier characters started airing on Dutch TV in 2004, 30 episodes are made, another 15 are ordered. Roef Ragas and Jack Wouterse play youthful versions of de Gier and Grijpstra.
- CBS aired a TV special featuring the original Hugh Pine novel (Storybreak #12).

== Radio ==
- Van de Wetering wrote 4 radio plays for German TV, again based on the Grijpstra and de Gier series. The plays were aired during the early nineties. Among these is Das Koan (1994), based on Van de Wetering's biography of Robert van Gulik, creator of the Judge Dee series. The English version, Judge Dee Plays His Lute, was included in the anthology with the same name.
