= 西村 =

西村, meaning 'west village', may refer to:

- Nishimura, Japanese transliteration
- Xicun Station, a station of the Guangzhou Metro
