= Imakita Kosen =

Japanese Confucianist (1816–1892)

Imakita Kōsen
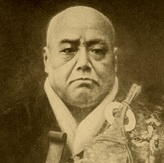
- Portrait of Zen Master Imakita Kosen (Kosen Soon)
- Title: Zen Master

Personal life
- Born: 1816 Settsu, Japan
- Died: 16 January 1892 (aged 75–76)

Religious life
- Religion: Zen Buddhism
- School: Rinzai

Senior posting
- Predecessor: Gisan Zenkai
- Successor: Soyen Shaku

Imakita Kōsen (今北 洪川; 3 August 1816 – 16 January 1892) was a Japanese Rinzai Zen rōshi and Neo-Confucianist.

Kosen did his Zen training under Daisetsu Shoen (1797–1855) at Sōkoku-ji and received inka from Gisan Zenkai at Sōgen-ji in Okayama. Kosen was instrumental in bringing Zen to lay practitioners and to the west. Kosen's Dharma heir Soyen Shaku participated in the World Parliament of Religions in Chicago, which introduced Soyen Shaku's student D. T. Suzuki to Paul Carus and western Theosophy. Kosen's dharma descendant Tetsuo Sōkatsu established Ningen Zen Kyodan, an independent lay-Rinzai school.

As one-time head abbot of Engaku-ji in Kamakura, Japan, he was known as a government loyalist and is remembered for his support of Emperor Meiji—in the 1870s serving as Doctrinal Instructor for the Ministry of Doctrine.

== See also ==
- Buddhism in Japan
- List of Rinzai Buddhists
- Ningen Zen

== Successors ==
- Kawajiri Hokin
- Soyen Shaku
- Tetsuo Sōkatsu

== See also ==
- Ningen Zen Kyodan

== Sources ==
- Dumoulin, Heinrich (2005). Zen Buddhism: A History. World Wisdom, Inc. ISBN 0-941532-90-9.
- Sawada, Janine Anderson (1993). Confucian Values and Popular Zen: Sekimon Shingaku in Eighteenth-Century Japan. University of Hawaii Press. ISBN 0-8248-1414-2.
- Sawada, Janine Tasca (Anderson) (2004). Practical Pursuits: Religion, Politics, and Personal Cultivation in Nineteenth-century Japan. University of Hawaii Press. ISBN 0-8248-2752-X.
- Victoria, Daizen (2002). Zen War Stories. Routledge. ISBN 0-7007-1580-0.
