= Morinaga Sōkō =

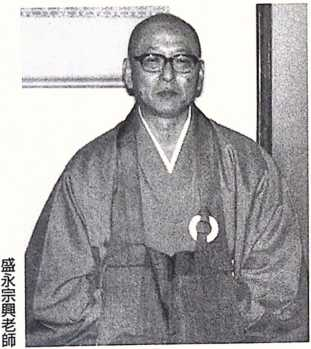
- Soko in 1987
- Title: Zen Master

Personal life
- Born: August 2, 1925 Uozu, Toyama, Japan
- Died: 12 June 1995 (aged 69)

Religious life
- Religion: Buddhism
- School: Rinzai

Senior posting
- Predecessor: Oda Sessō
- Successor: Ursula Jarand

Morinaga Sōkō (盛永 宗興, Morinaga Sōkō; 2 August 1925 – 12 June 1995) was a Rinzai Rōshi. He was the abbot of Daishu-in, a sub-temple of the Myōshin-ji complex within Ryōan-ji. Between 1986 and 1994 he was president of Hanazono University.

== Biography ==
Morinaga Sōkō was born in Uozu, Toyama in 1925 as the eldest son of five siblings, with three older sisters and a younger brother. His family had been farmers until his grandfather's generation. His father was a doctor and rented out the family's rice fields. He did not pursue medicine himself but studied humanities at Toyama High School.

While he was still a student, the age for conscription was lowered to 19 and he was drafted into the army in early 1945. Just before he was to be sent to war, both of his parents unexpectedly died, just one day apart. The war ended before he could be sent off and he returned to high school, graduating in 1947.

In 1949, he became a monk at Daishu-in under Gotō Zuigan, formerly abbot of Myōshin-ji and at that time abbot of Daitoku-ji. After a rigorous apprenticeship, he entered Daitoku-ji monastery and trained under his elder Dharma brother Oda Sessō Rōshi, who was also a disciple of Gotō Zuigan Rōshi and who had succeeded him as abbot of Daitoku-ji. Young Sōkō continued training at Daitoku-ji monastery until he received inka shōmei from Sessō Roshi in 1963. He returned to Daishu-in as the chief priest and served there until his death in 1995.

The Roshi made annual visits of one or two weeks each summer to England to teach at the Buddhist Society's annual Summer School. In 1984 he ordained Venerable Myōkyō-ni, head of the Zen Centre and closely affiliated to the London-based Buddhist Society. He also inaugurated her London training place Shōbō-an as a Zen Temple, where the teachings of Sōkō, Sessō and Sōjun continue to be practiced.

He had a number of Western students, notably Shaku Daijō and Ursula Jarand, both students of many years at Daishu-in in Kyōto. Ursula and Daijō Oshō built Daishu-in West Zen Temple in California, north of San Francisco.

== Publications ==
The Rōshi was the author of a dozen books in Japanese.

Published in English are:

- Pointers to Insight: Life of a Zen Monk (Morinaga:1985)
- Novice to Master: An Ongoing Lesson in the Extent of My Own Stupidity (Morinaga:2002)
- The Ceasing of Notions: Zen Text from the Tun-Huang Caves (Commentary on the Zekkanron 絶觀論, from the German Jarand:1988)
- Mumonkan: The Gateless Gate by Mumon Ekai with commentary by Soko Morinaga Roshi (The Buddhist Society:2023)

In German:

- Dialog über das Auslöschen der Anschauung - Dialogue about the Extinction of Contemplation Jarand, Ursula (translator), Frankfurt am Main: R. G. Fischer Verlag, 1987 - German translation of the Jueguanlun (Zekkanron) and Morinaga Soko Roshi's commentary on this text
- Hui-neng, Das Sutra des Sechsten Patriarchen - Hui-neng: The Sutra of the Sixth Patriarch Jarand, Ursula (translator), München: O. W. Barth Verlag, 1989 - German translation of the Platform sutra and Morinaga Soko Roshi's commentary on this text

== See also ==
- Buddhism in Europe
- Buddhism in Japan
- List of Rinzai Buddhists
