= Ogino Dokuon =

Rinzai rōshi

- Title: Rōshi

Personal life
- Born: 1819 Bizen, Okayama Prefecture, Japan
- Died: 1895 (aged 75–76)

Religious life
- Religion: Rinzai

Senior posting
- Based in: Shōkoku-ji
- Predecessor: Daisetsu Shōen

Ogino Dokuon (荻野 独園; 1819–1895) was a Rinzai rōshi remembered for his daring resistance to religious oppression directed toward Buddhists during the late Tokugawa period and Meiji period of Japan.

== Life ==
Dokuon received Dharma transmission from his teacher Daisetsu Shōen and later became abbot of Shōkoku-ji in 1879. In 1872 he was appointed director of Daikyō-in, which was an institution of the Meiji government set up that same year in order to "promote the 'prompt modernization' of the nation." Guised as an organization promoting the "Great Teaching" — consisting of Confucian ethics and Shinto — scholar Heinrich Dumoulin states that, "...one is hard put to find anything Buddhist there. It is no surprise, therefore, that the Buddhists were not very happy with this new decree, even though it did give them a participatory voice in policy matters and introduced a new organizational order." As leader of Daikyō-in Dokuon protested these policies to the government, though with virtually no effect. Even still, he was one of the most outspoken of anyone of his time period in the Buddhist community.

== See also ==
- Buddhism in Japan
- List of Rinzai Buddhists
