= Ogino Station =

Ogino Station may refer to either of the following two railway stations in Japan:

- Ogino Station (Toyama)
- Ogino Station (Fukushima)
