= Leitersdorf im Raabtal =

- Former municipality
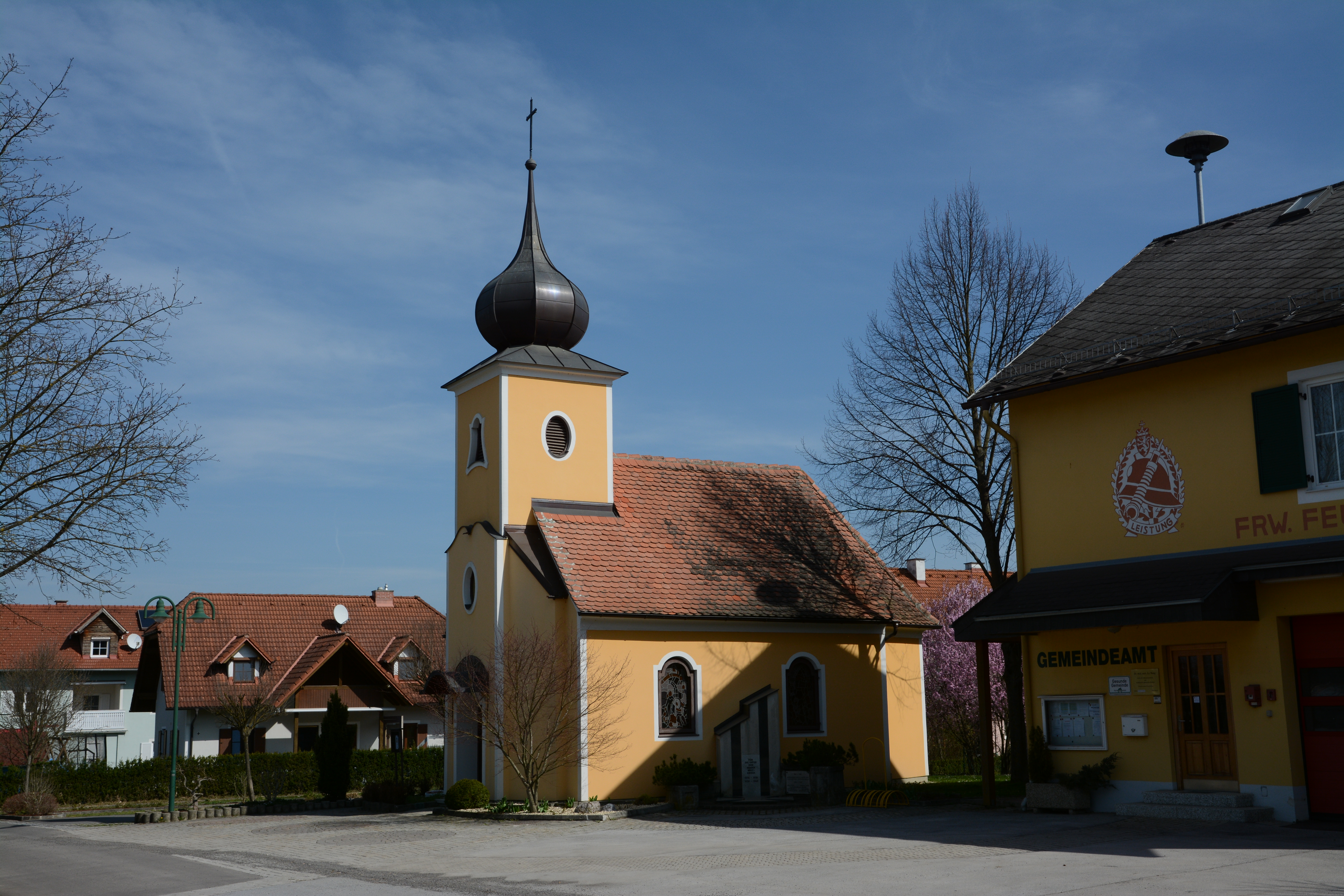
- Chapel in Leitersdorf

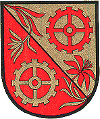
- Coat of arms

- Location within Austria
- Coordinates: 46°57′00″N 15°56′00″E
- Country: Austria
- State: Styria
- District: Südoststeiermark

Area
  - Total: 4.8 km^{2} (1.9 sq mi)
- Elevation: 285 m (935 ft)

Population (1 January 2016)
  - Total: 664
  - Density: 140/km^{2} (360/sq mi)
- Time zone: UTC+1 (CET)
  - Summer (DST): UTC+2 (CEST)
- Postal code: 8330
- Area code: +43 3152
- Vehicle registration: FB
- Website: www.leitersdorf.at

Leitersdorf im Raabtal (literally Leitersdorf in the Raab Vale) is a former municipality in the district of Südoststeiermark in the Austrian state of Styria. Since the 2015 Styria municipal structural reform, it is part of the municipality Feldbach.

== Population ==
Historical population
Year	Pop.	±%
1869	302	—
1880	284	−6.0%
1890	318	+12.0%
1900	300	−5.7%
1910	339	+13.0%
1923	352	+3.8%
1934	369	+4.8%
1939	365	−1.1%
1951	388	+6.3%
1961	364	−6.2%
1971	545	+49.7%
1981	508	−6.8%
1991	535	+5.3%
2001	575	+7.5%
2013	658	+14.4%
