= Eshin Nishimura =

Japanese Buddhist priest (born 1933)

- 西村 惠信
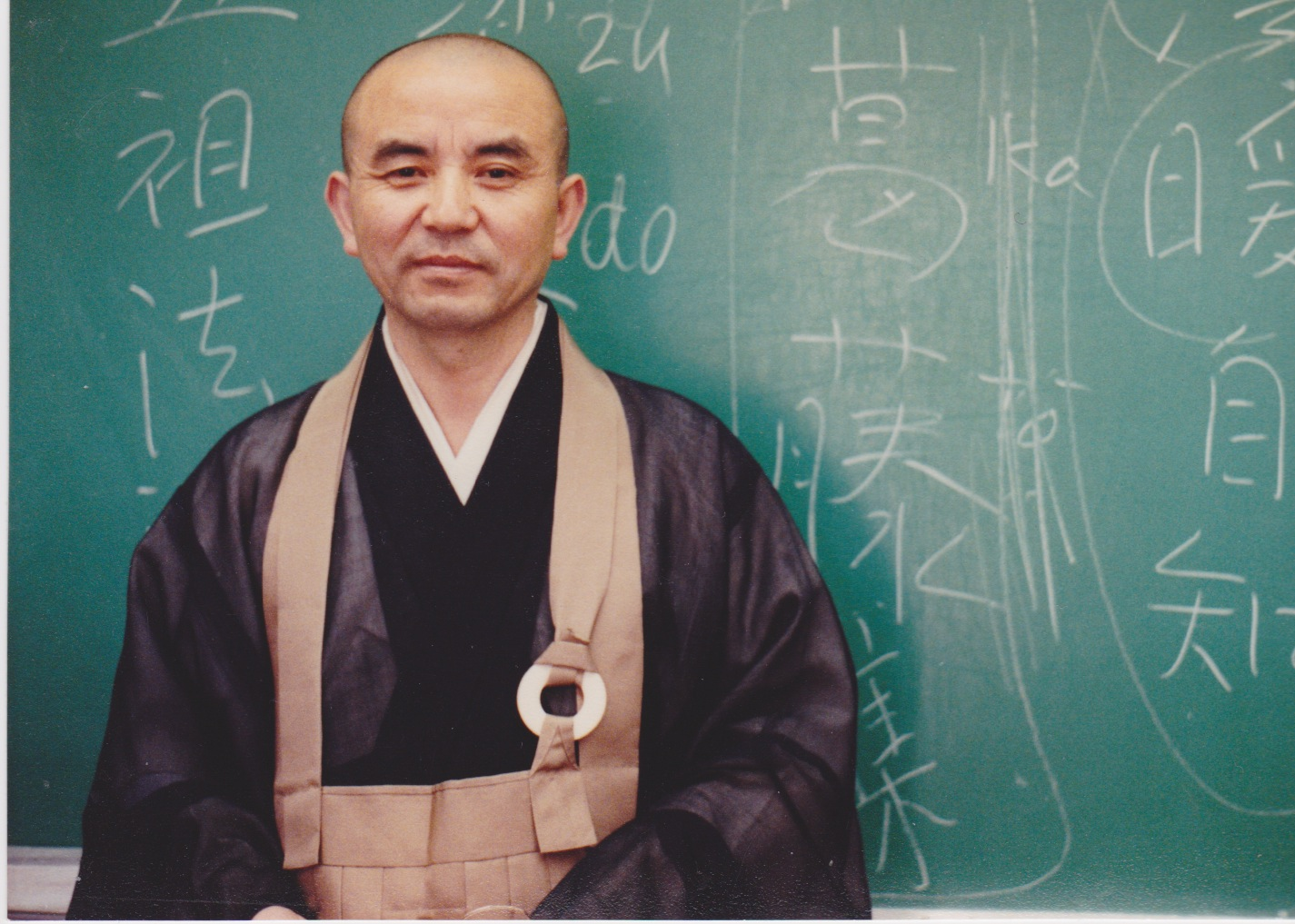
- Title: Rōshi

Personal life
- Born: Shiga Prefecture; Japan

Religious life
- Religion: Rinzai, Zen Buddhism

Senior posting
- Based in: Hanazono University

Eshin Nishimura (西村 惠信; born 1933) is a Japanese Rinzai Zen Buddhist priest, the former president of Hanazono University in Kyoto, Japan, and also a major modern scholar in the Kyoto School of thought. A current professor of the Department of Buddhism at Hanazono University, he has lectured at universities throughout the world on the subject of Zen Buddhism. The author of many books, most written in the Japanese language, Nishimura has been a participant in many dialogues on the relationship of Zen to Christianity and Western philosophy.

== Biography ==
Eshin Nishimura was born the youngest child of six siblings to a family of Rinzai practitioners. According to his own account, "Blessed with a profound karmic relationship with the Buddha, I entered the priesthood at age two and left my parents to live in a Zen temple as a priestling." Nishimura graduated from Hanazono University from their Department of Buddhist Studies in 1956. In 1969 he came to Oberlin College to give talks on Zen, and in 1970 and 1971 he taught a course for ten weeks on Zen at Carleton College and another course at Carleton on Keiji Nishitani's Religion and Nothingness in 1989.

== Bibliography ==
- Eshin Nishimura (2006). Kyōun ikkyū: Kamenshi no sugao. Tokyo: Shikisha. ISBN 4-88405-356-7. OCLC 170197952.
- Eshin Nishimura (2006). Rinzairoku o meguru danshō: Jiko kakuritsu no hōho. Kyoto: Zenbunkakenkyūjo. ISBN 4-88182-214-4. OCLC 77555659.
- Eshin Nishimura (2006). Hotoke no kotoba ichinichi ichiwa: Ikiru chikara ga waite kuru. Tokyo: Pīeichipīkenkyūjo. ISBN 4-569-64920-3. OCLC 170217292.
- Daisetz Teitaro Suzuki; Kitarō Nishida; Eshin Nishimura (2004). Nishida Kitarō ate Suzuki Daisetsu shokan: Okkū ai wakarete shuyu mo hanarezu. Iwanami Shoten. ISBN 4-00-024229-6. OCLC 57890677.
- Eshin Nishimura (2001). Kirisutosha to aruita Zen no michi. Hōzōkan. ISBN 4-8318-8143-0. OCLC 51643951.
- Eshin Nishimura (1998). Zen to Gendai. Tōkyō: Perikansha. ISBN 4-8315-0808-X. OCLC 39787277.
- Eshin Nishimura (1988). Watakushi no Jūgyūzu. Hōzōkan, Shōwa 63. ISBN 4-8318-8036-1. OCLC 32978613.
- Eshin Nishimura (1987). Zenrin shugyōron. Hōzōkan, Shōwa 62. ISBN 4-8318-7325-X. OCLC 19398516.
- Eshin Nishimura (1986). Rinzaishū. Tokyo: Shōgakkan. ISBN 4-09-581006-8. OCLC 15487025.
- Eshin Nishimura (1983). Zensō no seikatsu. Tokyo: Yūzankaku Shuppan, Shōwa 58. ISBN 4-639-00271-8. OCLC 16138955.
- Eshin Nishimura; Daikan (1982). Tōrei Oshō nenpu. Kyōto: Shibunkaku Shuppan, Shōwa 57. OCLC 17101775.
- Yasuaki Nara; Eshin Nishimura (1979). Zenshū. Tōkyō: Yūzankaku Shuppan, Shōwa 54. OCLC 10782743.
- Eshin Nishimura; Giei Sato; Smith, Bardwell L. (1973). Unsui: A Diary of Zen Monastic Life. University Press of Hawaii. ISBN 0-8248-0277-2.
