= Soyen Shaku =

Japanese Zen Buddhist master

- 釈 宗演
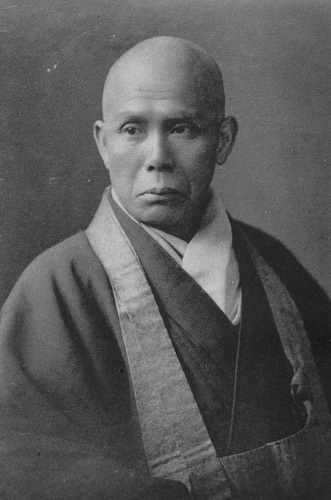
- Title: Zen Master

Personal life
- Born: January 10, 1860 Fukui, Japan
- Died: October 29, 1919 (aged 59) Kamakura, Japan

Religious life
- Religion: Zen Buddhism
- School: Rinzai

Senior posting
- Predecessor: Imakita Kōsen
- Successor: Tetsuo Sōkatsu

Soyen Shaku (釈 宗演, January 10, 1860 – October 29, 1919; written in modern Japanese Shaku Sōen or Kōgaku Shaku Sōen) was the first Zen Buddhist master to teach in the United States. He was a rōshi of the Rinzai school and was abbot of both Kenchō-ji and Engaku-ji temples in Kamakura, Japan. Soyen was a disciple of Imakita Kosen.

== Biography ==
Soyen Shaku was a Zen monk. He studied for three years at Keio University. In his youth, his master, Kosen, and others had recognised him to be naturally advantaged. He received Dharma transmission from Kosen at age 25, and subsequently became the superior overseer of religious teaching at the Educational Bureau, and patriarch of Engaku temple at Kamakura. In 1887, Shaku traveled to Ceylon to study Pali and Theravada Buddhism and lived the wandering life of the bhikkhu for three years. Upon his return to Japan in 1890, he taught at the Nagata Zendo. In 1892, upon Kosen's death, Shaku became Zen master of Engaku-ji.

In 1893 Shaku was one of four priests and two laymen, representing Rinzai Zen, Jōdo Shinshū, Nichiren, Tendai, and Esoteric schools, comprising the Japanese delegation that participated in the World Parliament of Religions in Chicago, organised by John Henry Barrows and Paul Carus. He had prepared a speech in Japan, and had it translated into English by his (then young and unknown) student D. T. Suzuki. It was read to the conference by Barrows. The subject was "The Law of Cause and Effect, as Taught by Buddha". Subsequently, Shaku delivered "Arbitration Instead of War".

At this conference he met Paul Carus, a publisher from Open Court Publishing Company in La Salle, Illinois. Before Shaku returned to Japan, Carus asked him to send an English-speaker knowledgeable about Zen Buddhism to the United States. Shaku, upon returning to Japan asked his student and Tokyo University scholar D. T. Suzuki to go to the United States, where he would eventually become the leading academic on Zen Buddhism in the West, and translator for Carus's publishing company.

Shaku served as a chaplain to the Japanese army during the Russo-Japanese War. He lectured soldiers about how to face their own deaths with unwavering equanimity, stating that they had to defeat not only their external enemies, but also their inner enemies, which he called "demons of the mind" (心魔, shinma). In 1904, the Russian author Leo Tolstoy invited him to join in denouncing the war, but Shaku refused, concluding that "...sometimes killing and war becomes necessary to defend the values and harmony of any innocent country, race or individual." (quoted in Victoria, 1997) After the war, he attributed Japan's victory to its samurai culture.

In 1905, he returned to America as a guest of Ida Russell and her husband, businessman Alexander Russell. He spent nine months at their isolated oceanside house on the Great Highway in San Francisco, teaching the entire household Zen. Mrs. Russell was the first American to study koans. Shortly after arriving, Shaku was joined by his student Nyogen Senzaki. During this time he also gave lectures, some to Japanese immigrants and some translated by D. T. Suzuki for English-speaking audiences, around California. Following a March 1906 train trip across the United States, giving talks on Mahayana translated by Suzuki, Shaku returned to Japan via Europe, India and Ceylon.

From 1914 to 1917, Shaku served as the president of the Rinzai sect university, Rinzaishū Daigaku (today Hanazono University) in Kyoto.

Soyen Shaku died on 29 October 1919 in Kamakura.

== Dharma heirs ==
- Tetsuo Sōkatsu (Ryobo-an Sokatsu)

== Selected works (in English) ==
- Sermons of a Buddhist Abbot: A Classic of American Buddhism. Three Leaves. 2004. ISBN 0-385-51048-9.
- Zen for Americans. Open Court. 1989. ISBN 0-87548-273-2.

== See also ==
- Buddhism in the United States
- Buddhism in Japan
- List of Rinzai Buddhists
- Timeline of Zen Buddhism in the United States
