= Kurt Kankan Spellmeyer =

Kurt Spellmeyer
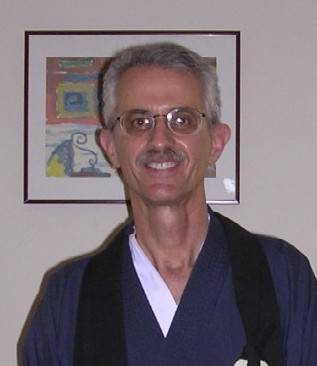
- Kurt Spellmeyer

Personal life
- Born: 1955 (age 70–71) United States
- Website: Cold Mountain Sangha

Religious life
- Religion: Zen Buddhism
- School: Rinzai
- Lineage: Cold Mountain Sangha
- Dharma name: Kankan (Ch. Guan Han)

Kurt Spellmeyer is a Zen teacher and professor in the English Department at Rutgers University.

== Zen lineage ==
Kurt Spellmeyer, Kankan Roshi, trained with Takabayashi Genki and Kangan Glenn Webb, founders of the Seattle Zen Center. In 1985, Spellmeyer completed his training under Webb Roshi and was authorized to teach. He received the dharma name Kankan (Ch. Guan Han, “Sees the Cold”), at a private ceremony with Webb in 1991.

Kankan Roshi has practiced Zen meditation for 40 years. He has directed the Cold Mountain Sangha since 1994. The Cold Mountain (Kanzan) lineage of Rinzai Zen can be traced back to the Han Shan Temple in Suzhou, China.

== Teaching ==
From 1985 until 2021, Spellmeyer served as Director of the School of Arts and Sciences Writing Program. Spellmeyer earned a PhD from the University of Washington. The Writing Program at Rutgers, which offers courses at all levels from developmental writing to advanced writing for the sciences and the professions, currently serves 17,000 each year and employs roughly 250 faculty.

== Writing ==
Spellmeyer is the author of Buddha at the Apocalypse: Awakening from a Culture of Destruction (Wisdom Publications, 2010), Arts of Living: Reinventing the Humanities for the Twenty-first Century (SUNY Press, 2003), The New Humanities Reader (Houghton-Mifflin, 2002), Common Ground: Dialogue, Understanding, and the Teaching of Composition (Prentice Hall, 1992).

In Arts of Living, Spellmeyer asks readers to separate the explicit content of academic knowledge from the way that this knowledge helps perpetuate enduring forms of structural inequality. He is critical of both conservative elitists like Allan Bloom and self-professed "leftists" who claim an oppositional status while reinforcing class distinctions of the kind described by Pierre Bourdieu. Although Spellmeyer's research has been influenced by sociologists like Bourdieu, Charles Derber, and others, he is particularly indebted to Barbara and John Ehrenreich's work on the rise of "new class"—the professional-managerial elite, including academics, who have become the core of the Democratic Party in the U.S., displacing a working-class constituency. In a review of Arts of Living, one critic said:

Not everyone who reads Spellmeyer's text will agree wholeheartedly; as John Brereton states in his blurb, it's "guaranteed to be controversial." And, rightly so. Spellmeyer has few kind words for critical theorists, contending that critique is an illusion by which we only change our ideas when we should be seeking to change actual lives. Even if one does not agree with parts or most of his arguments, Arts of Living, I believe, is an important read for every humanities scholar and teacher.

— Beth Brunk-Chavez, Composition Studies Vol. 33, No. 1 (Spring 2005), pp. 140-143

Spellmeyer has also published articles on theories of composition/rhetoric, critical theory, and the sociology of knowledge and of academic institutions, in journals that include College English, College Composition and Communication, The Journal of Advanced Composition, Pedagogy, Transformations, and Religion and the Arts. Spellmeyer is a contributing editor at Tricycle: The Buddhist Review.

== Awards ==
In 1993 he won the Ross Winterowd Award for his 1992 book Common Ground: Dialogue, Understanding, and the Teaching of Composition.

In 2004, he received Rutgers' Teacher-Scholar Award for outstanding contributions to the scholarship on teaching.
