= Mumon Yamada =

- Title: Roshi

Personal life
- Born: 16 July 1900 Toyota, Aichi, Japan
- Died: 24 December 1988 (aged 88)

Religious life
- Religion: Buddhism
- School: Rinzai

Senior posting
- Based in: Shofukuji
- Predecessor: Seki Bokuo
- Successor: Shunan Noritake Shodo Harada

Mumon Yamada (山田 無文, Yamada Mumon; July 16, 1900 – December 24, 1988) was a Rinzai roshi, calligrapher, and former abbot of Shōfuku-ji in Kobe, Japan. Mumon was also the former head of the Myōshin-ji branch of the Rinzai school of Japan.

His most prominent student (and Dharma heir) is Shodo Harada of Sōgen-ji, an influential master in both Japan and the United States.

== Life ==
Mumon was born in Toyota in Aichi, Japan, on July 16th, 1900. During the Second World War, while with Seisetsu Roshi, he visited many places of war, and what he saw left him with deep feelings of repentance.

=== Activities relating to aftermath of World War II ===
Mumon, together with Rinzai priest Hisamatsu Shin'ichi, was on the original planning committee for the first Zen-Christian Colloquium started by the Quakers in 1967. The meeting was designed to open dialogue between Christians and Buddhists and establish peace in the wake of damage caused by World War II.

Daizen Victoria writes, "[Yamada Mumon] helped establish the 'Society to Repay the Heroic Spirits [of Dead Soldiers]' (Eirei ni Kotaeru Kai). Yamada asserted that since Japan's fallen soldiers had clearly been involved in a 'holy war,' the government should reinstate financial support for enshrining their "heroic spirits" (eirei) in Yasukuni Jinga, a major Shinto shrine located in the heart of Tokyo."

In a speech he gave on the matter, Mumon said, "Japan destroyed itself in order to grandly give the countries of Asia their independence. I think this is truly an accomplishment worthy of the name 'holy war.' All of this is the result of the meritorious deeds of two million five hundred thousand spirits in our country who were loyal, brave, and without rival. I think the various peoples of Asia who achieved their independence will ceaselessly praise their accomplishments for all eternity."

=== Later life ===
In 1967, Mumon went on pilgrimages to various Southeast Asian countries to apologize to and say sutras for the war dead of all religions, and he taught this posture of repentance to his students as well. He traveled to the opening of Dai Bosatsu Zendo in New York State, to the San Francisco Zen Center, to the Mount Baldy Zen Center in California, and to Mexico. He made a pilgrimage to India and at Bodhgaya built a Japanese temple. He went to Europe and opened the East West Spiritual Exchange between Catholicism and Buddhism, himself entering and living in nine contemplative monasteries in Europe, experiencing the life of the monks there. His disciples settled all over Europe, strengthening his extensive ties with the West.

== Teaching style ==
According to G. Victor Sōgen Hori in the book The Faces of Buddhism in America, "Students of Yamada Mumon Rōshi say that outside the sanzen room, he looked and acted like a tiny, wispy, immaterial Taoist hermit, but that inside the sanzen room, he suddenly turned into a lion."
