= Buddhist Society =

UK registered charity

Coordinates: 51.4915°N 0.1442°W

The Buddhist Society

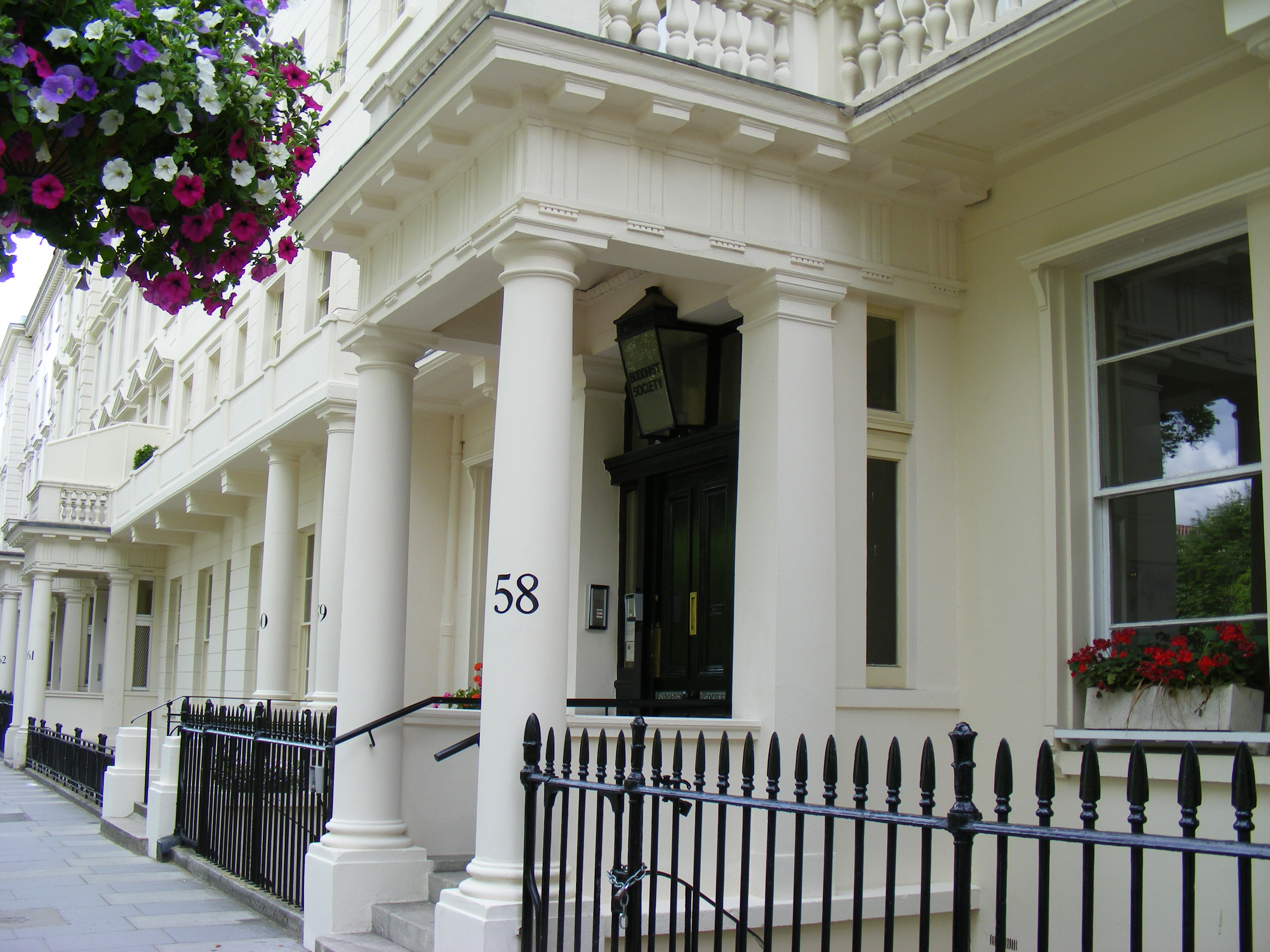
- The Buddhist Society building in Warwick Square
- Formation: 1924
- Founder: Christmas Humphreys
- Type: Buddhism in the United Kingdom
- Headquarters: 58 Eccleston Square, London SW1V 1PH; England
- Website: thebuddhistsociety.org
- Remarks: Patronage of the 14th Dalai Lama

The Buddhist Society is a UK registered charity which aims to encourage the study and practice of Buddhist principles.

The Buddhist Society is an inter-denominational and non-sectarian lay organisation. It offers talks and classes on the teachings of all the different major mainstream Buddhist schools and traditions, as well as a structured programme of courses on general Buddhism, for both the public and members. It has a publishing programme and in its premises houses one of the main libraries in Britain on Buddhism. It is managed by an elected council and its patron is the 14th Dalai Lama.

Among other publications, it produces The Buddhist Directory, a reference book which lists the vast majority of Buddhist groups, centres and other related organisations in the United Kingdom and Ireland, and The Middle Way, a quarterly journal (referring to the Buddhist concept of a Middle Way).

== History ==
The Society was originally created in 1924 in London as an offshoot of a Theosophical Lodge by Christmas Humphreys, a British judge and convert to Buddhism. It became an independent body in 1926, by then Buddhist and no longer associated with Theosophy, and Humphreys remained its president until his death in 1983. In 1961 the 14th Dalai Lama became patron of the Society, the first organisation in the West to be so honoured.

The Buddhist Society was one of the first Buddhist organisations outside Asia and remains one of the oldest in Europe to date.

== Activities ==
The Buddhist Society runs a number of classes, courses and lectures, many of which are open to the general public. This includes Saturday meditation classes and popular Tuesday and Thursday lunchtime sessions. More specific members classes are offered in the Zen, Theravadan and Tibetan traditions. The Society is open on occasional Sundays to the public for 'Zen Sundays', 'Theravadan Sundays' and a Pure Land class.

Three courses are taught at the Society representing three levels of Buddhist study, the first of which, ‘Introducing Buddhism’, is free and open to the public. This can be followed by the Intermediate and advanced, 'Great Way' courses. A Correspondence Course is also available to those who are unable to study at a Buddhist centre.

Free public lectures are held at least once a month on a Wednesday evening. Topics are varied and concern not only the practical application of Buddhism but its cultural and historical aspects too. The guest speakers include academic as well as spiritual scholars of Buddhism. Special function days are held four times a year on Saturdays and are intended for those who do not live in London. A Summer School is held annually in August, too. This one-week residential course is open to members of all Buddhist schools and explores the major aspects of the Buddha's teachings and their practice. The Summer School is highly popular and is now in its 63rd year (2014).

== Publishing ==
For more than 50 years The Buddhist Society has published Buddhist works and continues to do so today. The Buddhist Directory is a comprehensive directory of Buddhist groups and organisations in the UK and Ireland. It also gives details of sizeable library collections, publishers and retailers of Buddhist literature and items.

The Society continues to print a selection of Buddhist classics and important new works including some titles by its founder Christmas Humphreys. Books can be bought by mail-order or in person at the Society.

The Middle Way is the quarterly journal of the Buddhist Society and has been in print since 1926 originally under the title Buddhism in England. The journal is respected worldwide and contains news and articles on Buddhist practice and history as well as details of the Society's programme. Non-members can take out a subscription without joining the society.

== Facilities ==
In 1956 the Buddhist Society moved to its present location at 58 Eccleston Square in south-west London. The library on the ground floor, which began with just a few volumes in 1926, is now a collection in excess of 4,500 volumes. Members can request books by post and renew them by email and there is an online catalogue on the Society's website. The library also houses a small bookstall and offers items such as incense and cards for sale.

The Society's Audio Department offers CDs and tapes of public lectures and courses for sale at a small cost and there is a free tape library for the registered blind.

The building also has a lecture hall and two shrine rooms and is a treasure house of Buddhist statuary and artefacts presented to the Society by donors from around the world.

== Membership ==
Membership includes subscription to The Middle Way, access to all lectures, classes and courses and full use of the library services.

The Buddhist Society is located close to Victoria Station and is open to all Monday to Friday from 2pm to 6pm and on Saturdays until 5pm.

== See also ==
- Ashin Thittila
- Christmas Humphreys
- European Buddhist Union
- Network of Buddhist Organisations
- Sīlācāra
- Zen Centre
