= Kenneth Kraft =

Kenneth Lewis Kraft (July 16, 1949 – October 1, 2018) was a professor of Buddhist studies and Japanese religions (emeritus) at Lehigh University in Bethlehem, Pennsylvania.

== Education ==
Kraft received a B.A. from Harvard University in 1971. He holds an M.A. in Asian Languages and Cultures from the University of Michigan (1978) and a Ph.D. in East Asian Studies from Princeton University (1984).

== Career ==
In 1984, Kraft became a postdoctoral fellow at Harvard's Reischauer Institute of Japanese Studies. He joined the Lehigh University faculty in 1990 and was appointed a full professor in 2001. At Lehigh he has served as chair of the Religion Studies department and director of the College Seminar Program.

He was a visiting professor at the Stanford University Japan Center and a visiting scholar at the International Research Institute for Zen Buddhism, both in Kyoto. He also taught at the University of Pennsylvania and Swarthmore College.

Kraft has served on the advisory boards of the Buddhist Peace Fellowship in Berkeley, California; the Yale Forum on Religion and Ecology; the Journal of Buddhist Ethics; the Rochester Zen Center; and the World Faiths Development Dialogue in Washington DC.

In 1992, he was featured in "The Creative Spirit," a PBS television series. In 2008, he participated in "Secrets of the Samurai Sword," a NOVA documentary, and, in 2009, "Inquiry into the Great Matter: A History of Zen Buddhism," an independent film.

In his early research, Kraft explored the transmission of Zen from China to Japan in the 13th and 14th centuries. Zen master Daitō, a seminal figure in this process, is best known as an exemplar of post-enlightenment training. Kraft documented Daitō's life, his teaching, and his role in the development of capping phrases (jakugo), a form of spiritual/literary commentary.

The transmission of Zen from Asia to the West accelerated after World War II. In 1988, Kraft edited Zen: Tradition and Transition, a collaboration by present-day Zen teachers and scholars. It addressed some of the same issues that had arisen in Daitō's era: What is real Zen? What are the criteria of authenticity?

Buddhism's encounter with the West in the 20th century inspired an international movement known as engaged Buddhism. Its leaders include the 14th Dalai Lama and Thích Nhất Hạnh. Kraft began writing about engaged Buddhism in the mid-1980s, at the height of the Cold War. Some of the underlying concerns can be framed as questions: What do Buddhist ethical principles signify today? What is the relation between work on oneself and work in the world? Does Buddhist nonviolence call for unwavering opposition to war, or are there exceptions?

Some observers challenge the apparent newness of engaged Buddhism. Columbia University scholar Thomas Yarnall has criticized the work of Kraft and other "modernists" who "appropriate, own, and reinvent Buddhism from the ground up." In Yarnall's view, engaged Buddhism should be seen as a revival of original Buddhism, which was more engaged than is usually assumed.

Buddhism may have resources that are freshly relevant in a time of ecological crisis. Dharma Rain: Sources of Buddhist Environmentalism, an anthology coedited in 2000 by Kraft and Stephanie Kaza, was an early contribution to an emerging field.

== Awards and honors ==
Kraft's 1992 book Eloquent Zen: Daitō and Early Japanese Zen was selected as an "Outstanding Academic Book" by Choice magazine.

In 2005, he received a Lindback Foundation Award for distinguished teaching by a senior member of the Lehigh University faculty.

== Books ==
- Zen: Tradition and Transition. Grove Press, 1988. Editor. ISBN 080213162X. French edition: Le Zen: Tradition et Transformation. Christian de Bartillat, 1993.
- Eloquent Zen: Daitō and Early Japanese Zen. University of Hawai'i Press, 1992. ISBN 9780824813833.
- Inner Peace, World Peace: Essays on Buddhism and Nonviolence. State University of New York Press, 1992. Editor. ISBN 0791409708.
- The Wheel of Engaged Buddhism: A New Map of the Path. Weatherhill, 1999. ISBN 9780834804630. Spanish edition: Budismo Solidario. Editorial Maitri, 2001.
- Zen Teaching, Zen Practice: Philip Kapleau and The Three Pillars of Zen. Weatherhill, 2000. Editor. ISBN 9780834804401.
- Dharma Rain: Sources of Buddhist Environmentalism. Shambhala Publications, 2000. Coeditor with Stephanie Kaza. ISBN 9781570624759.
- Zen Traces: Exploring American Zen with Twain and Thoreau. Paul Dry Books, Inc., 2018. ISBN 9781589881280.
