= Hanazono University =

University in Kyoto, Japan

Coordinates: 35°0′59.2″N 135°43′35.7″E

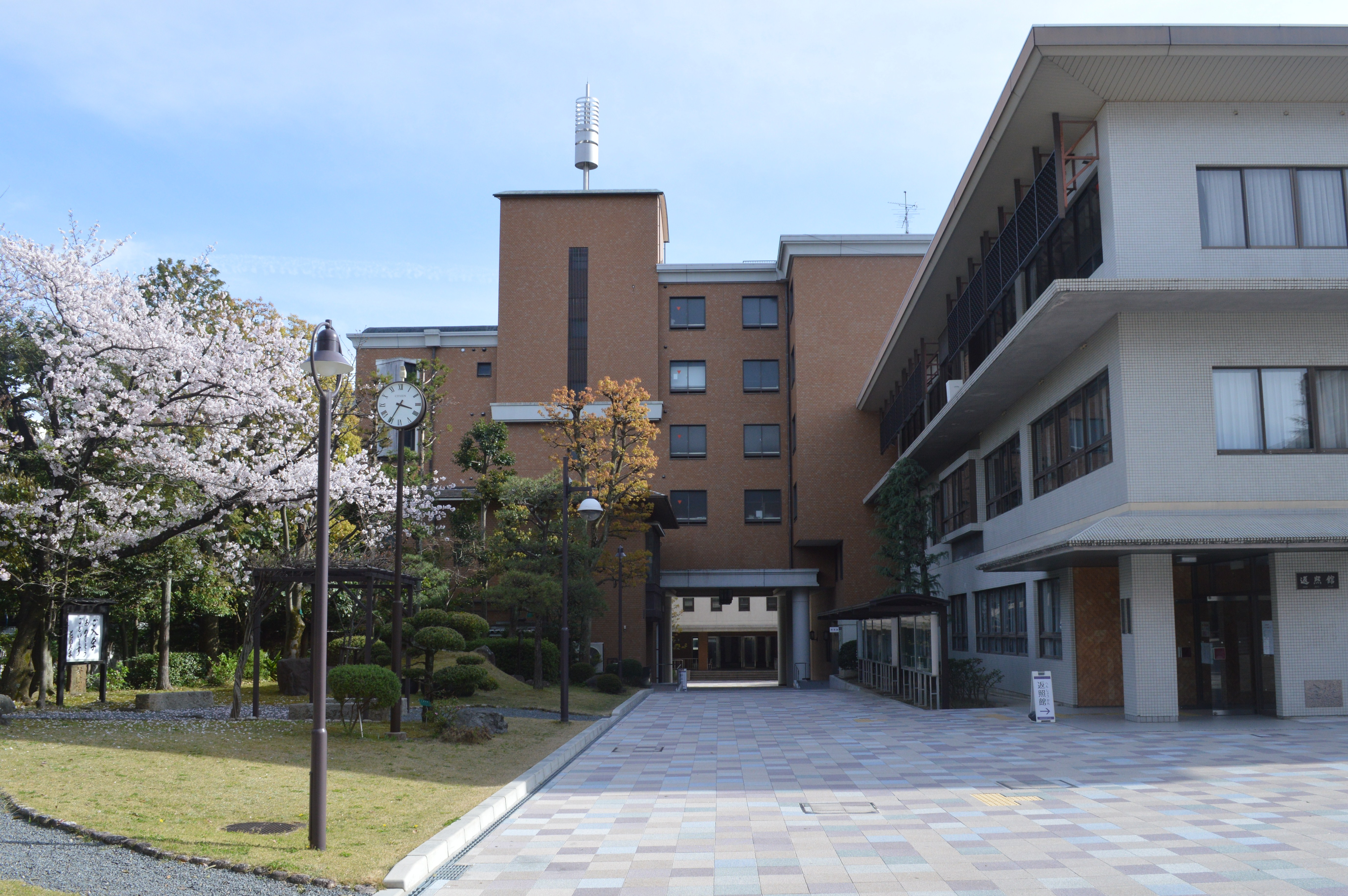
Hanazono University courtyard

Hanazono University (花園大学, Hanazono Daigaku) is a private university in Kyoto, Japan that belongs to the Rinzai sect (specifically the Myōshin-ji temple complex, which it is next to). The university and the neighborhood are named for Emperor Hanazono, whose donated his palace to make Myōshin-ji.

It is a major competitor of the Sōtō college in Tokyo known as Komazawa University. Despite the university's sectarian affiliation, the school accepts Soto students. The school operates two research centers important in Zen academia, i.e. the Institute for Zen Studies and the International Research Institute for Zen Buddhism. Founded in 1872 as a seminary for those interested in the priesthood, the university carries on that tradition while offering an education to those uninterested in becoming a priest. The university's president is Dr. Kosan Abe. Former presidents include Eshin Nishimura.

Since 1979, the Institute for Zen Studies has organised together with the Monastic Interreligious Dialogue (DIMMID) the so-called East-West Spiritual Exchanges in which Buddhist and Christian monks or nuns take turns residing for one month in each other's monasteries.

== Sources ==
- de Béthune, Pierre François (2020). "Prayer and Hospitality". Dilatato Corde. X (2 - July - December). DIMMID.
- Hisamatsu, Shin'ichi; Gishin Tokiwa; Christopher Ives (2002). Critical Sermons of the Zen Tradition: Hisamatsu's Talks on Linji. University of Hawaii Press. ISBN 0-8248-2384-2. OCLC 44117857.
- Hori, Victor Sōgen (2003). Zen Sand: The Book of Capping Phrases for Kōan Practice. University of Hawaii Press. ISBN 0-8248-2284-6. OCLC 50590697.
- Smyers, Karen Ann (1999). The Fox and the Jewel: Shared and Private Meanings in Contemporary Japanese Inari Worship. Honolulu: University of Hawaii Press. ISBN 0-8248-2102-5. OCLC 231775156.
