= Dharma transmission =

Spiritual teacher-disciple lineage in Zen-Buddhism

Dharma transmission, in Zen and Chan Buddhism, is a custom in which a person is established as a "successor in an unbroken lineage of teachers and disciples, a spiritual 'bloodline' (kechimyaku) theoretically traced back to the Buddha himself." The dharma lineage reflects the importance of family structures in ancient China, and forms a symbolic and ritual recreation of this system for the monastic "family".

In Rinzai-Zen, inka shōmei (印可証明) is ideally "the formal recognition of Zen's deepest realisation", but practically it is being used for the transmission of the "true lineage" of the masters (shike) of the training halls. There are only about fifty (Note: Muho Noelke, Part 10: What does it take to become a full-fledged Sōtō-shu priest and is it really worth the whole deal?) to eighty of such inka shōmei-bearers in Japan.

In Sōtō-Zen, dharma transmission is referred to as shiho, and further training is required to become an oshō. (Note: Muho Noelke, Part 2: Ten points to keep in mind about dharma transmission)

== History ==
The notion and practice of Dharma transmission developed early in Chan history as a way to gain credibility and foster institutional ties among members of the Chan community. Charts of dharma lineages were developed to represent the continuity of the Buddhist dharma. Originally, these lineages included only the Chinese Patriarchs, but they were later extended to twenty-eight Indian Patriarchs and seven Buddhas.

=== Chan lineage ===
The Chan tradition developed from the established tradition of "Canonical Buddhism", which "remained normative for all later Chinese Buddhism". It was established by the end of the sixth century, as a result of the Chinese developing understanding of Buddhism in the previous centuries.

One of the inventions of this Canonical Buddhism was the transmission list, a literary device used to establish a lineage. Both Tiantai and Chan took over this literary device to lend authority to those developing traditions, and guarantee their authenticity:

Chan texts present the school as Buddhism itself, or as the central teaching of Buddhism, which has been transmitted from the seven Buddhas of the past to the twenty-eight patriarchs, and all the generations of Chinese and Japanese Chan and Zen masters that follow.

The concept of dharma transmission took shape during the Tang period, when establishing the right teachings became important to safeguard the authority of specific schools. The emerging Zen tradition developed the Transmission of the Lamp genre, in which lineages from Shakyamuni Buddha up to their own times were described.

Another literary device for establishing these traditions was the Kao-seng-chuan (Biographies of Eminent Monks), compiled around 530. The Chan tradition developed its own corpus in this genre, with works such as Anthology of the Patriarchal Hall (952) and the Jingde Records of the Transmission of the Lamp (published 1004). McRae considers Dumoulin's A History of Zen to be a modern example of this genre, disguised as scientific history.

=== Chinese patriarchs ===
Dazu Huike offering his arm to Bodhidharma. Ink painting by Sesshū Tōyō, 1496, Muromachi period, Japan.

The Chan lineages picture the semi-legendary monk Bodhidharma as the patriarch who brought Chan to China. Only scarce historical information remains about him, but his hagiography developed as the Chan tradition grew stronger and gained prominence in the early 8th century.

According to McRae, it is unclear whether the practitioners around Bodhidharma and his disciple Huike considered themselves part of a unified movement or group, such as a "Chan school," or felt any continuity with the later tradition. He says even the name "proto-Chan" does not really reflect their activities. McRae also points out that no known lineage theory existed in Proto-Chan, and the connection between it and the Early Chan tradition (consisting of the Northern, Southern, and Oxhead factions) is unclear.

==== Six Chinese patriarchs ====
By the late eighth century, a lineage of Chan's six ancestral founders in China had developed. Due to the influence of Huineng's student Shenhui, the traditional form of this lineage had been established:

1. Bodhidharma (達摩) ca. 440 – ca. 528
2. Huike (慧可) 487–593
3. Sengcan (僧燦) ?–606
4. Daoxin (道信) 580–651
5. Hongren (弘忍) 601–674
6. Huineng (慧能) 638–713

Huineng tearing sutras

However, certain questions remain. Regarding the connection between the second and third patriarchs, on the one hand, and the fourth patriarch, on the other, Whalen Lai points out that "Huike was a dhuta (extreme ascetic) who schooled others, and one of his disciples was Sengzan (d. 606). However, the link between this pair and Daoxin (580–651, now deemed the fourth Chan patriarch) is far from clear and remains tenuous."

According to Wendi Adamek:

There was no 'Chan school' in existence during the time of the six Chinese patriarchs—it cannot even be said to have begun with Shenhui, the one who yoked six names to a powerfully generative idea. However, once the imaginary line had been drawn in the sands of the past, it began to sprout real branches. It continues to put forth new shoots even today.

==== Shenhui and Huineng ====
According to tradition, the sixth and last ancestral founder, Huineng (惠能; 638–713), was one of the giants of Chan history, and all surviving schools regard him as their ancestor. The dramatic story of Huineng's life recounts a controversy over his claim to the title of patriarch. After being chosen by Hongren, the fifth ancestral founder, Huineng had to flee by night to Nanhua Temple in the south to avoid the wrath of Hongren's jealous senior disciples.

Modern scholarship, however, has questioned this narrative. Historical research shows that this story was created around the middle of the 8th century, beginning in 731, by Shenhui, a successor to Huineng, to gain influence at the Imperial Court. He claimed Huineng as his predecessor rather than the then publicly recognized successor, Shenxiu. In 745, Shenhui was invited to take up residence in the Ho-tse temple in Luoyang. In 753, he fell out of grace and had to leave the capital to go into exile. The most prominent successor in his lineage was Guifeng Zongmi. According to Zongmi, Shenhui's approach was officially sanctioned in 796, when "an imperial commission determined that the Southern line of Chan represented the orthodox transmission and established Shen-hui as the seventh patriarch, placing an inscription to that effect in the Shen-lung temple".

Doctrinally, the Southern School is associated with the teaching that enlightenment is sudden, while the Northern School is associated with the teaching that enlightenment is gradual. This was a polemical exaggeration, since both schools were derived from the same tradition, and the so-called Southern School incorporated many teachings of the more influential Northern School. Eventually both schools died out, but Shenhui's influence was so immense that all later Chan schools traced their origin to Huineng, and "sudden enlightenment" became a standard Chan doctrine.

=== Indian patriarchs ===
Later writings extended this lineage to include twenty-eight Indian patriarchs. In the Song of Enlightenment (證道歌 Zhèngdào gē) of Yongjia Xuanjue (永嘉玄覺, 665–713), one of the chief disciples of Huìnéng, it is written that Bodhidharma was the 28th patriarch in a line of descent from Mahākāśyapa, a disciple of Śākyamuni Buddha, and the first patriarch of Chán Buddhism.

==== Twenty-eight Indian patriarchs ====
Keizan's Transmission of the Light gives twenty-eight patriarchs up to and including Bodhidharma in this transmission: (Note: For narratives in English of most patriarchs see Houn Jiyu (Peggy Teresa Nancy Kennett), 1999, Zen is Eternal Life (Selling Water by the River), Mount Shasta, California: Shasta Abbey Press.)

	Sanskrit	Chinese	Vietnamese	Japanese	Korean
1	Mahākāśyapa	摩訶迦葉 / Móhējiāyè	Ma-Ha-Ca-Diếp	Makakashō	마하가섭 / Mahagasŏp
2	Ānanda	阿難陀 (阿難) / Ānántuó (Ānán)	A-Nan-Đà (A-Nan)	Ananda Buddha (Anan)	아난다 (아난) / Ananda Buddha (Anan)
3	Śānavāsa	商那和修 / Shāngnàhéxiū	Thương-Na-Hòa-Tu	Shōnawashu	상나화수 / Sangnahwasu
4	Upagupta	優婆掬多 / Yōupójúduō	Ưu-Ba-Cúc-Đa	Ubakikuta	우바국다 / Upakukta
5	Dhrtaka	提多迦 / Dīduōjiā	Đề-Đa-Ca	Daitaka	제다가 / Chedaga
6	Miccaka	彌遮迦 / Mízhējiā	Di-Dá-Ca	Mishaka	미차가 / Michaga
7	Vasumitra	婆須密 (婆須密多) / Póxūmì (Póxūmìduō)	Bà-Tu-Mật (Bà-Tu-Mật-Đa)	Bashumitsu (Bashumitta)	바수밀다 / Pasumilta
8	Buddhanandi	浮陀難提 / Fútuónándī	Phật-Đà-Nan-Đề	Buddanandai	불타난제 / Pŭltananje
9	Buddhamitra	浮陀密多 / Fútuómìduō	Phục-Đà-Mật-Đa	Buddamitta	복태밀다 / Puktaemilda
10	Pārśva	波栗濕縛 / 婆栗濕婆 (脅尊者) / Bōlìshīfú / Pólìshīpó (Xiézūnzhě)	Ba-Lật-Thấp-Phược / Bà-Lật-Thấp-Bà (Hiếp-Tôn-Giả)	Barishiba (Kyōsonja)	파률습박 (협존자) / P'ayulsŭppak (Hyŏpjonje)
11	Punyayaśas	富那夜奢 / Fùnàyèshē	Phú-Na-Dạ-Xa	Funayasha	부나야사 / Punayasa
12	Ānabodhi / Aśvaghoṣa	阿那菩提 (馬鳴) / Ānàpútí (Mǎmíng)	A-Na-Bồ-Đề (Mã-Minh)	Anabotei (Memyō)	아슈바고샤 (마명) / Asyupakosya (Mamyŏng)
13	Kapimala	迦毘摩羅 / Jiāpímóluó	Ca-Tỳ-Ma-La	Kabimora (Kabimara)	가비마라 / Kabimara
14	Nāgārjuna	那伽閼剌樹那 (龍樹) / Nàqiéèlàshùnà (Lóngshù)	Na-Già-Át-Lạt-Thụ-Na (Long-Thọ)	Nagaarajuna (Ryūju)	나가알랄수나 (용수) / Nakaallalsuna (Yongsu)
15	Āryadeva / Kānadeva	迦那提婆 / Jiānàtípó	Ca-Na-Đề-Bà	Kanadaiba	가나제바 / Kanajeba
16	Rāhulata	羅睺羅多 / Luóhóuluóduō	La-Hầu-La-Đa	Ragorata	라후라다 / Rahurada
17	Sanghānandi	僧伽難提 / Sēngqiénántí	Tăng-Già-Nan-Đề	Sōgyanandai	승가난제 / Sŭngsananje
18	Sanghayaśas	僧伽舍多 / Sēngqiéshèduō	Tăng-Già-Da-Xá	Sōgyayasha	가야사다 / Kayasada
19	Kumārata	鳩摩羅多 / Jiūmóluóduō	Cưu-Ma-La-Đa	Kumorata (Kumarata)	구마라다 / Kumarada
20	Śayata / Jayata	闍夜多 / Shéyèduō	Xà-Dạ-Đa	Shayata	사야다 / Sayada
21	Vasubandhu	婆修盤頭 (世親) / Póxiūpántóu (Shìqīn)	Bà-Tu-Bàn-Đầu (Thế-Thân)	Bashubanzu (Sejin)	바수반두 (세친) / Pasubandu (Sechin)
22	Manorhitajuna	摩拏羅 / Mónáluó	Ma-Noa-La	Manura	마나라 / Manara
23	Haklenayaśas	鶴勒那 (鶴勒那夜奢) / Hèlènà (Hèlènàyèzhě)	Hạc-Lặc-Na	Kakurokuna (Kakurokunayasha)	학륵나 / Haklŭkna
24	Simhabodhi	師子菩提 / Shīzǐpútí	Sư-Tử-Bồ-Đề / Sư-Tử-Trí	Shishibodai	사자 / Saja
25	Vasiasita	婆舍斯多 / Póshèsīduō	Bà-Xá-Tư-Đa	Bashashita	바사사다 / Pasasada
26	Punyamitra	不如密多 / Bùrúmìduō	Bất-Như-Mật-Đa	Funyomitta	불여밀다 / Punyŏmilta
27	Prajñātāra	般若多羅 / Bōrěduōluó	Bát-Nhã-Đa-La	Hannyatara	반야다라 / Panyadara
28	Dharmayana / Bodhidharma	Ta Mo / 菩提達磨	Đạt-Ma / Bồ-Đề-Đạt-Ma	Daruma / Bodaidaruma	Tal Ma /보리달마 / Poridalma]

==== Mahākāśyapa ====
Mahākāśyapa holding a reliquary, sixth century, Hebei province, China

According to the traditional Chan accounts, the first Dharma transmission occurred as described in the Flower Sermon. The Buddha held up a golden lotus flower before an assembly of "gods and men". None who were in attendance showed any sign of understanding except his disciple Mahākāśyapa, who offered only a smile. The Buddha then said,

I have the right Dharma Eye Treasury, the wondrous mind of nirvana, the reality beyond appearance. The Dharma-door of mind-to-mind transmission has been entrusted to Kāśyapa.

Epstein comments, "Thus Mahākāśyapa received the transmission of Dharma and became the first Buddhist patriarch." This traditional account linking Chan's founding to the Flower Sermon first appeared during the Song dynasty, in 1036 CE.

== Function ==
Though dharma transmission implies the acknowledgement of insight into the teachings of Buddhism as understood by the Zen tradition, especially seeing into one's true nature, dharma transmission is also a means to establish a person into the Zen tradition:

The procedure establishes the disciple as a transmitting teacher in their own right and successor in an unbroken lineage of teachers and disciples, a spiritual 'bloodline' (kechimyaku) theoretically traced back to the Buddha himself.

The dharma lineage reflects the importance of family-structures in ancient China, and forms a symbolic and ritual recreation of this system for the monastical "family".

=== Esoteric and exoteric transmission ===
According to Borup the emphasis on 'mind to mind transmission' is a form of esoteric transmission, in which "the tradition and the enlightened mind is transmitted face to face". Metaphorically this can be described as the transmission of a flame from one candle to another candle, or the transmission from one vein to another. In exoteric transmission the requirement is "direct access to the teaching through a personal discovery of one's self. This type of transmission and identification is symbolized by the discovery of a shining lantern, or a mirror."

This polarity is recognizable in the emphasis that the Zen-tradition puts on maintaining the correct Dharma transmission, while simultaneously stressing seeing into one's nature:

The matter of learning from a teacher is most essential. People of old who arrived at the source of seeing nature, passed through many barriers clearly and completely without a dot of doubt, and traveled freely through the world opening big mouths in discussion, only came to know the transcendental message of Zen after they finally ran into Zen masters of great vision. Then they sincerely sought certainty and wound up with the duty of the teacher's succession, bearing the debt of Dharma, never to forget it for a moment. This is called dharma succession. Since ancient times the designated succession of the ancestral teachers has always been like this. (Note: The modern framing of Zen as the experience of 'ultimate truth' or reality may influence the institutional shape western Zen is going to take, where individual freedom is highly appraised. See also Bodiford 2008, pp 277-279)

Nevertheless, while Zen has traditionally stressed the importance of formal dharma transmission, there have also been well known examples of the phenomenon known as mushi dokugo (independent realization without a master), such as Nōnin, Jinul and Suzuki Shōsan, who attained awakening on their own, though all of them were familiar with Zen teachings.

=== Family structure ===
According to Bodiford, "Zen is the predominant form of Buddhism because of dharma transmission":

[I]t has ancestors whom it honors. It honors those ancestors by transmitting their legacy to proper descendants, from generation to generation, who will maintain and carry on their family traditions [...] [I]n Zen this process of transmitting a family legacy is given structural form through the ritual of dharma transmission.

Bodiford distinguishes seven dimensions which are discernible in both family relationships and in dharma lineages:

1. Ancestral dimension: "Ancestors (so) constitute a fundamental source of power". Performing rituals in honour of the ancestors keeps them in high regard "among the living".
2. Biological dimension: the dharma lineage creates (spiritual) offspring, just as the family creates new life.
3. Linguistic dimension: dharma heirs receive new names, which reflect their tie to the dharma 'family'.
4. Ritual dimension: rituals confirm the family relationships. One's teacher is honored in rituals, as are deceased teachers.
5. Legal dimension: teachers have the obligation to discipline their students, just as students have the obligation to obey their teachers.
6. Institutional and financial dimension: dharma heirs have an obligation to support their home temple, both financially and ritually.
7. Temporal dimension: long-term relationships foster the previous dimensions.

The family-model is easier recognized when East Asian languages are being used, because the same terminology is used to describe both earthly and spiritual family relations.

Dharma transmission is both concrete and abstract:

Every link in the genealogy of dharma transmission occurs in documented historical circumstances: a specific place and time, identifiable individuals, and specific words and actions. At the same time, though, Zen texts also assert that true transmission consists of no transmission. In other words, it occurs only mind-to-mind.

This feature gives dharma transmission a great flexibility:

[W]hen the historical evidence is in one's favor, one can demonstrate the validity of dharma transmission by citing any number of the aforementioned seven dimensions. When the historical evidence is less favorable, then one can shift the argument to the religious realm by arguing that the only facts that really matter are the depths and quality of one's Buddha realization.

== Contemporary use in the Chan and Zen traditions ==
Within the various Chan and Zen traditions, dharma transmission has different meanings, and most schools distinguish between the recognition of awakening itself and the responsibilities of monastic leadership.

=== Chinese Chan ===
Traditional Chinese Chan still exists in China, Taiwan and Hong Kong, though it is less known in the west than Japanese Zen.

In the Chinese Buddhist tradition, there are 3 systems of transmission:

1. Tonsure system: a person becomes tonsured as a novice monastic under the Master's school. He or she is given a Dharma name (法號) at the time of tonsure based on the Master's lineage. This name is also called "the outer name (外號)" because it is used by all people to address the novice. This name is used for life. At the same time, the Master will give the novice sramanera (or sramanerika) ten precepts.
2. Ordination system: a novice will become fully ordained as a Bhikṣu monk or Bhikṣuni nun with the Triple Platform Ordination (Observing the Śrāmanera, Bhikṣu and Bodhisattva precepts). This ordination must be presided by ten senior monks with at least ten years of seniority with a pure practice in upholding the monastic precepts. In this ceremony, the ten witnessing masters represent the Triple Gem accepting the novice into the Sangha. At this time, another Dharma name (法名) is given. This name is called "precept name (戒名) or inner name (內號)" because it is used only by one's Master. This name represents the novice's precept lineage transmission.
3. Dharma transmission system: This system upholds the Treasury of the True Dharma Eye through the generations of transmission. This is the Mind-to-Mind seal of the Dharma that is beyond the scriptures. At this time, another Dharma name is given. This is also called "the inner name" and used only by one's Master. This name represents the novice's Dharma lineage transmission. After receiving this name, one will use this name instead of the name received during precept ordination to write one's Dharma name (Inner Name)(Outer Name).

It is customary to refer to one's own tonsure Master as "Gracious Master", precept Master as "Root Master" and Dharma transmission Master as "Venerable Master". In Chinese Buddhism, these 3 systems are separate and are not performed by the same Masters. Moreover, due to the strong emphasis on the Dharma, when a person receives Dharma transmission, he or she is recognized as that Chán Master's Dharma son or daughter. Lay Buddhists may also receive this Dharma transmission, but this is very rare and with very few incidences. Most of the monks and nuns who received transmission have already been tonsured and ordained by other Masters.

=== Rinzai ===
All Rinzai lineages pass through Hakuin Ekaku, the 18th century revivalist, who considered himself to be an heir of Shoju Rojin (Shoju Ronin, Dokyu Etan, 1642–1721), though Hakuin never received formal recognition of his insight from Shoju Rojin, let alone transmission of his lineage. When he was installed as head priest of Shōin-ji in 1718, he had the title of Dai-ichiza, "First Monk":

It was the minimum rank required by government regulation for those installed as temple priests and seems to have been little more than a matter of paying a fee and registering Hakuin as the incumbent of Shōin-ji.

All contemporary Rinzai-lineages stem formally from Inzan Ien (1751–1814) and Takuju Kosen (1760–1833), both students of Gasan Jito (1727–1797). Gasan is considered to be a dharma heir of Hakuin, though "he did not belong to the close circle of disciples and was probably not even one of Hakuin's dharma heirs".

Through Hakuin, all contemporary Japanese Rinzai-lineages relate themselves to the Ōtōkan lineage, brought to Japan in 1267 by Nanpo Jomyo, who received dharma transmission in China in 1265. (Note: Rinzai-Obaku Zen - What is Zen? - History)

==== Insight and succession ====
In the Rinzai school, a difference is made between acknowledgement of insight and succession in the organisation:

From the Rinzai perspective, true realization (jisshō) and succession to a master (shijō) are two different stages in the course of practice, the latter implying a comprehensive integration of awakening in the activities of everyday life.

According to Mohr,

In the Rinzai school the issue of Dharma transmission is essentially subjective, that is, left to the discretion of the master, and the ambiguity of terms such as "successor in the Dharma" (hassu 法嗣) has persisted down to the present. According to the context or the circumstances, it can signify either spiritual recognition or inheritance of a temple lineage.

The most common form of transmission in Rinzai Zen is the acknowledgement that one has stayed in the monastery for a certain amount of time, and may later become a temple priest.

==== Further practice ====
After finishing koan-study, further practice is necessary:

[I]t would take 10 years to solve all the kôans [...] in the sôdô. After the student has solved all koans, he can leave the sôdô and live on his own, but he is still not considered a roshi. For this he has to complete another ten years of training, called "go-go-no-shugyô" in Japanese. Literally, this means "practice after satori/enlightenment", but Fukushima preferred the translation "special practice". Fukushima would explain that the student builds up a "religious personality" during this decade. I would say it is a kind of period that functions to test if the student is actually able to live in regular society and apply his koan understanding to daily life, after he has lived in an environment that can be quite surreal and detached from the lives of the rest of humanity. Usually, the student lives in a small parish temple during this decade, not in a formal training monastery.

==== Inka shōmei ====
Common transmission does not include inka shōmei. Ideally inka shōmei is "the formal recognition of Zen's deepest realisation", but practically it is being used for transmission of the "true lineage" of the masters (shike) of the training halls. Training halls are temples which are authorised for further training after being qualified as a temple priest.

There are only about fifty to eighty such inka shōmei-bearers in Japan:

In Rinzai Zen, it is relatively easy to say who is a roshi and who is not. Anyone who is authorized by another roshi (i.e. his teacher) is a roshi. This authorization (officially the "inka-shômei" document) is documented on a piece of paper, that is why it is also called colloquially "ichi-mai", that is "one sheet (of paper)". The transmission is totally vertical from teacher to student, no peer control is involved. That means that the Rinzai sect has no means to control who is made a roshi and who is not. In spite of that, the number of Rinzai roshis is relatively low, maybe around 50 or so.

A qualified Zen master bestows inka only upon "those select few" who have successfully completed the entire Rinzai koan curriculum, and "are eligible to serve as sōdō roshi, that is, master of a training hall, in distinction from a common temple:

[D]isciples today are expected to spend a dozen or more years with a master to complete a full course of training in koan commentary. Only when a master is satisfied that a disciple can comment appropriately on a wide range of old cases will he recognize the latter as a dharma heir and give him formal "proof of transmission" (J. inka shomei). Thus, in reality, a lot more than satori is required for one to be recognized as a master (J. shike, roshi) in the Rinzai school of Zen at present. The accepted proof of satori is a set of literary and rhetorical skills that takes many years to acquire.

Inka Shōmei (印可証明) (Korean: Inga) literally means "the legitimate seal of clearly furnished proof":

The ideogram for inka has two parts: in is on one side, ka is on the other. The root meaning resides in the character for in (yin in Chinese). The right half of this in consists of an ancient character shaped like our modern P. In ancient times the character represented an actual object. It stood for the image of just the right half (P) of the emperor's official seal (IP), after the Emperor had broken in half the whole seal."

=== Sōtō ===
In Sōtō, dharma transmission is the acknowledgement of the ties between teacher and student. It has been subject to changes over the history of the Sōtō-school.

Though Dōgen emphasized the importance of the purity of the teachings, and highly valued lineage and dharma transmission, the Sōtō-school has its origins in various lineages and dharma transmissions. Dogen received dharma transmission from his Chinese teacher Rujing, with whom he studied two years, but in medieval Sōtō he was also considered to be a dharma heir of Myōzen, a Rinzai-teacher, with whom he studied eight years. And Tettsū Gikai, the dharma-grandson of Dogen, was also lineage-holder of Nōnin, the founder of the Dharuma-shu, also a Rinzai-school. Gikai passed this lineage over to Keizan, who thereby was also lineage-holder in at least two lineages.

To make the history of Sōtō even more complicated, the Caodong-lineage that Dogen inherited through Rujing was passed on previously from the Caodong-master Dayang Jingxuan to Touzi Yiqing via the Rinzai-master Fushan Fayuan. Fushan Fayuan had once studied under Dayang Jingxuan. When Jingxuan died Fayuan had received Jingxuan's "portrait, robe, and a verse that expressed his teaching", promising "to pass them on to a suitable successor". Fayuan chose his student Touzi Yiqing to inherit this lineage, a fact that was acknowledged in Keizan's Denkoroku, but "[i]n the standard versions of Dogen's writings, however, all direct references to Yiqing's indirect succession have been eliminated".

==== Criteria ====
Manzan Dokahu (1636–1714), a Sōtō reformer,

[P]ropagated the view that Dharma transmission was dependent on personal initiation between a Master and disciple rather than on the disciple's enlightenment. He maintained this view in the face of strong opposition, citing as authority the towering figure of Japanese Zen, Dogen [...] This became and continues to this day to be the official Sōtō Zen view.

According to Manzan, even an unenlightened student could receive dharma transmission:

Manzan argued that as long as master and disciple fulfill the condition of a personal relationship, then Dharma transmission 'with either an enlightened or an unenlightened disciple are both equivalent in [maintaining] the true tradition'.

In Sōtō-zen, since Manzan Dokahu, two criteria are applied for dharma transmission:

1. Isshi inshō – "Exclusive authentication from no more than one teacher". This criterion "prohibits clerics inheriting more than one lineage"
2. Menju shihō – "Face-to-face bestowal of succession". This criterion "prohibits conferral by proxy, conferral at a distance to strangers, or posthumous conferral". (Note: The origins of Sōtō-zen, or Dogen-shu, are in contradiction to this criterion. Gikai, the third abbot of Ehei-ji, was also lineage-holder of Nōnin. According to the Denkoroku, Dogen himself had also received dharma transmission from Myōzen.)

==== Status ====
In contrast to the status that dharma transmission has begotten in the west, in Sōtō it has a relatively low status:

[D]harma transmission provides access to only a relatively low grade. It is listed as a requirement for the very lowest ecclesiastical status, that of an instructor third class (santō kyōshi). Thus, in present day Sōtō Zen, dharma transmission constitutes a preliminary step, after which one's real development begins [...] Today, the key authority conferred by dharma transmission is that it qualifies a priest to manage an ordinary (jun hōchi) local temple. These temples are not ascetic training but of ceremonial services on behalf of lay patrons.

To supervise the training of monks, further qualifications are necessary:

The relatively low status of dharma transmission means that in and of itself it does not qualify one to accept students or to train disciples. According to the regulations, Zen students should be supervised only by a teacher who has attained supervisory certification (i.e. sanzen dōjō shike status), that is, someone who in the popular literature might be called a Zen master. To attain supervisory certification requires not just high ecclesiastical grades and dharma seniority but also at least three years' experience as an assistant supervisor at a specially designated training hall (tokubetsu sōdō), during which time one undergoes an apprenticeship.

The duties which come with this full qualification were not always appreciated. In the medieval organisation of the Sōtō-shu, when rotation of abbotship was the norm. Dharma transmission at a branch temple obliged one to serve at least one term as abbot at the main temple. Abbotship gave severe duties, and financial burdens, for which reason many tried to avoid the responsibility of abbotship:

Tsūgen, Baisan and Jochū each demanded that future generations excommunicate any Zen teacher who failed to fulfill his obligation to serve as abbot of a head temple. Baisan decreed that the obedient Zen successors should seize defiant ones and then burn the offender's succession's certificate (shisho) before his eyes. Note the remarkable inversion that has occurred here. Instead of dharma transmission being a qualification for becoming an abbot, successful service as abbot has become a requirement for being allowed to retain one's dharma transmission.

==== Spiritual realization ====
The Sōtō-shu also confers inka shōmyō (or inshō) "[granting] the seal of approval to a realization of enlightenment", upon students. This is an

... idealized religious aspect of the Dharma transmission process. Zen master and disciple may evoke this mystical paradigm through ritual ceremony in the master's room (shi-tsunai), but other, more mundane institutional concerns can govern the actual selection and promotion of Dharma 'heirs'.

Dharma transmission is part of the maintenance of the Sōtō-institutions. Authority and temple-property are handed down, often from father to son. It is not a guarantee for spiritual attainment:

dharma transmission is no guarantee for anything. It only shows that the person who gave the transmission – and only that one person – was convinced that the student was qualified as a teacher. Could he have been wrong? Yes, he could have been wrong. Therefore, if you want to make sure that a teacher is actually a good teacher, you should not only ask if he or she has dharma transmission or not. The question is: Where does this dharma transmission come from? What lineage does it represent? And even more important: What practice did accompany it? What kind of student was the teacher before he or she became a teacher? What is his or her practice now?

==== Shiho ====
Dharma transmission is also called shiho. In the Sōtō school a student receives Dharma transmission during a denbō ceremony, which is the last ceremony of their shiho ceremony:

The usual practice...is for a Sōtō monk to be given Dharma transmission by the priest who ordained him (in most cases his own father), after he returns from his minimum period of monastery training. Because Dharma transmission is a prerequisite to becoming the head priest of a Sōtō branch temple, virtually all Sōtō priests meet this ritual requirement at a relatively early stage in their careers.

Muhō Noelke, the German-born former abbot of the temple Antai-ji, describes his understanding of shiho:

...the recognition of the transmission that took place long before the ceremony itself. In fact, it has nothing to do at all with the paper, with philosophy or with mystical experience. The 24 hours of the daily life shared by teacher and student are the content of the transmission, and nothing else [...] In Antaiji, when you receive shiho after, say, eight or nine years, you will have sat for 15.000 hours of zazen with your teacher. Not only that, you also shared many thousands of meals with him, worked together in the fields for thousands of hours, spread manure, cut grass and wood together, side by side, you sweat together in the summer and froze together in the winter. You cooked for him and filled the bath tub for him, you know how he likes the temperature both of his soup and the bathing water. You also shared many drinks, probably. In each of these activities, the dharma is transmitted. None should be left out.

Shiho is done "one-to-one in the abbot's quarters (hojo)". Three handwritten documents certify the dharma transmission;

a) Shisho (the scripture of transmission, the names of the ancestors arranged in a circle – the dharma has passed on from to Shakyamuni to yourself, and now you give it back to Shakyamuni. There is a small piece of papaer, probably originally written by Sawaki Roshi, with some comments. This paper is also copied by the student when doing dharma transmission at Antaiji.)

b) Daiji (the great matter, a cryptic symbolization of the content of the teaching. Again, there is a small extra sheet of paper that explains about the meaning of the symbols.) c) Kechimyaku (the blood lineage, looks quite similar to the blood line transmission that you already wrote at the time of ordination)

d) Actually, in the lineage of Sawaki Roshi (and maybe other lineages as well) a student is told to write a fourth document on an extra sheet of paper, which is called Hisho (the secret document, which is encoded, but the code for deciphering is on the same paper, so once you hold it in your hands it is not so "secret" anymore.)

The procedure has to take place only once in one's life, and binds the student to the teacher forever:

Dharma transmission can happen once, and only once, or never at all. Multiple dharma transmission is nonsense. If you receive dharma transmission from one teacher, from then on that is your one and only teacher, your real teacher (jap. hon-shi). The multiple lineage holders that you hear of in the West are bullshit. Therefore it is important that both sides, but especially the student, make sure that this is the right time for them to make this important step.

If a students does not have the feeling he wants to be tied to this teacher for the rest of his life, he may refuse to take dharma transmission from this particular teacher. Since the time of Manzan Dōhaku (1636–1714), multiple dharma transmissions are impossible in Sōtō Zen.

==== Further study ====
According to Muho Noelke, dharma transmission marks the beginning of the real learning:

Dharma transmission is not the last and final step in a student's practice. Quite the opposite, one might call it the real first step on the way of practice. The way has just begun, but now the student has decided which exact way he wants to follow to the end. But all the real hardships still lay ahead of him. To use the example of boy-meets-girl again: At this point of time they have decided that they are made for each other, so to speak, they want to get married and have kids. Hopefully, that does not mean that the romance is over. It just means that both are prepared for the real struggle to begin. (Note: This is reflected by the Five ranks of enlightenment. The same notion can be found within the Rinzai-tradition. See Three Mysterious Gates, and the Four Ways of Knowing)

After Dharma transmission one has become a member of the "blood line" of Zen, but is not yet qualified as an Oshō. After the ten-e and zuise ceremonies, one is qualified as an oshō. There-after one has to practice for some time, at least six months, in an sôdô-ango, an officially recognized Sōtō-shu training centre. (Note: Muho Noelke, Part 5: Sessa-takuma - ango as life in a rock grinder)

After that one can start to work in a temple. The newly acquired status is confirmed in the kyoshi-honin ceremony. There-after follows the first practice-period in one's own temple, with the aid of a susho (head monk). This is followed by the Jushoku-himei ceremony, which confirms one's status as dai-oshō.

=== Sanbo Kyodan ===
The Sanbo Kyodan mixes Sōtō and Rinzai elements. Students in this school follow the Harada-Yasutani koan curriculum, in which great emphasis is placed on kenshō, the initial insight into one's true nature. Having attained kenshō is publicly acknowledged in a jahai-ceremony. After working through the Harada-Yasutani koan curriculum, which may take as short as five years, the student receives a calligraphy testifying that he or she "has finished the great matter". This is publicly acknowledged in the hasansai-ceremony, giving the status of hasan.

The Sanbo Kyodan has two levels of teaching authority, namely junshike ("associate zen master"), and shōshike ("authentic zen master"). Junshikes can give dokusan, authorize kenshō, and supervise part of the koan-study. Shoshikes can supervise the advanced koan study and perform religious ceremonies, such as the precept ceremony and wedding ceremonies.

The process for obtaining these titles has varied within the Sanbo Kyodan. Hasansai may be preparatory to the junshike title, but may also be the promotion to this title. And promotion to shoshike may be preparatory to dharma transmission, but may also be equivalent to it.

In dharma transmission, the student receives the sanmotsu, akin to the Sōtō shiho ceremony. This is coupled with the Rinzai notion of inka, Dharma transmission. In Rinzai, only students who have completed the complete Rinzai koan curriculum and "are eligible to serve as sōdō roshi, that is, master of a training hall, in distinction from a common temple, receive transmission. In the Sanbo Kyodan, inka is derived from Harada's Rinzai master Dokutan Sōsan.

=== White Plum Asanga ===
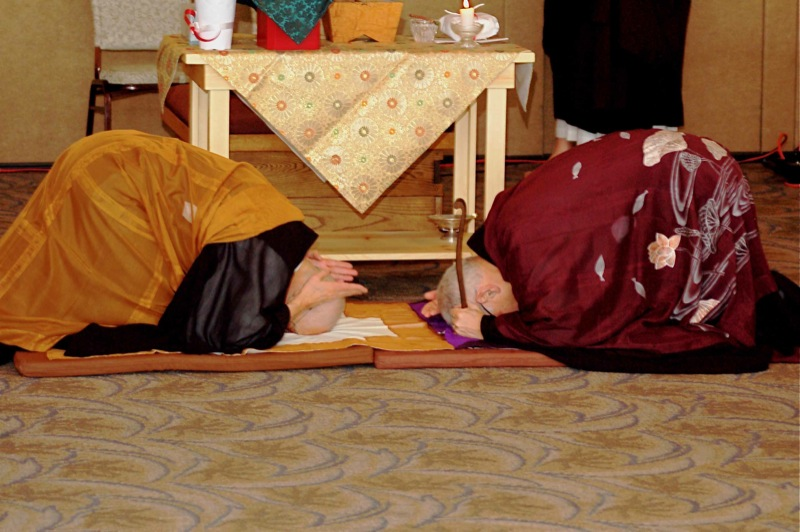
Michel Genko Dubois (left) and Dennis Genpo Merzel performing "mind to mind" in Dubois's shiho ceremony

In the White Plum Asanga, Dharma transmission comes first, and qualifies one as a sensei. This may be followed by inka, the final acknowledgement.

=== Korean Seon ===
In Korean Seon, Inka (In'ga) typically refers to the private acknowledgement of dharma transmission from a teacher to their student. "Transmission" is used to refer to the public ceremonial version of the same acknowledgement.

Both are considered equal in authority and "realization". A monk with either In'ga or the public "transmission" is qualified to hold the post of Seon Sa (seonsa; 선사; 禪師), or "Zen Master" for a temple, and give transmission to their own students (either, In'ga or public "transmission"). The majority of Zen Masters in Korea have only received, and only give In'ga, with the formal transmission ceremony being far more rare.

In the Western Kwan Um School of Zen created by the Korean Zen Master Seung Sahn, "Inka" is granted to an individual who has completed their koan training and is granted the title Ji Do Poep Sa Nim (jido beopsa-nim; 지도법사님; 指導法師님). Dharma transmission in the Kwan Um School of Zen comes after inka, denoting the individual is now a Seon Sa Nim. Seung Sahn himself is quoted saying in reference to the administration of his Western organization,

Inka and transmission are different. Our 'Ji Do Poep Sa Nim' title is like the Japanese title 'sensei.' In Korea, we call it 'Chong Yong Sun'—your practice is okay, teaching other people is possible. This title has almost disappeared in Korea, although it still exists in China. In Korea we now have the title 'Ip Sung Sunim.'—'head monk.'" This innovation applies only to Seung Sahn's Western organization, and is not normative for Korean Seon/Zen practice either historically, or currently.

=== Vietnamese Thiền ===
Thích Nhất Hạnh has created a ritual known as "Lamp Transmission", making a teacher a dharmācārya—an individual with "limited teaching authority".

== Criticism ==
=== Early Buddhist rejection of lineal-succession ===
According to Robert Sharf, early Indian Buddhist materials explicitly reject the paramparā ideal of lineal-succession, the "notion that sacred teachings are authorized through an unbroken line of enlightened sages." As such, Buddha refused to appoint any successor to guide the sangha after his death. Instead, he laid out procedures by which monks could govern themselves without dependence on a single charismatic leader. According to Clasquin-Johnson, the early sangha was a form of limited participatory democracy in which leadership rested not on any individual but upon a set of abstract principles. In this way, Buddha advised his students to take the Dharma as their master after his passing, rather than take refuge in a living person. As the Dazhidu lun says, "when the Buddha was about to enter Nirvana he said to his followers: 'From now on, rely on the Dharma, and not on people!'"

The Mahāparinibbāna-sutta contains the Buddha's final instructions at the time of his death. In this sutta, the Buddha states:

It may be, Ananda, that to some among you the thought will come: 'Ended is the word of the Master; we have a Master no longer.' But it should not, Ananda, be so considered. For that which I have proclaimed and made known as the Dhamma and the Discipline, that shall be your Master when I am gone.

Similarly, in the same sutta, Buddha tells his students, "be islands unto yourselves, refuges unto yourselves, seeking no external refuge; with the Dhamma as your island, the Dhamma as your refuge, seeking no other refuge." The Mahāparinibbāna-sutta also denies any distinction between esoteric and exoteric doctrine and rejects the idea that the sangha should depend on a teacher who holds some things back with a "closed fist."

According to Clasquin-Johnson, early Buddhism's preference for abstract leadership (in the form of the Dharma) over human leadership differed from the normal method of routinization practiced by other Indian religious sects. Normally, founders of religious sects in India passed authority onto their chief disciples, and the sect's success or failure depended on the leader's charisma or lack thereof. Clasquin-Johnson observes that much of the Mahayana tradition has reverted to this pattern, in some variation or another, as exemplified by Zen patriarchal lineages (as well as the Tibetan tulku system). Given the rejection of lineal-succession in early materials, Sharf points to the Brahmanicization of Buddhism as a likely contributing factor to Chan's preoccupation with an esoteric master-to-disciple transmission. (Note: Sharf also suggests that the process of Brahmanicization may well have contributed to Buddhism's eventual disappearance in India.)

=== Criticism from within the Zen tradition ===
The institutions of dharma transmission have come under criticism at various times throughout Zen history. For example, Jørn Borup points out that Zen masters like Linji and Ikkyū "were said to have refused to receive transmission certificates," rejecting the circus associated with such things.

During the Ming dynasty in China, important masters like Hanshan Deqing, Zibo Zhenke, and Yunqi Zhuhong did not belong to any formal lineage. According to Jiang Wu, these eminent Ming Chan monks emphasized self-cultivation while criticizing formulaic instructions and nominal recognition. Wu writes that at this time "eminent monks, who practiced meditation and asceticism but without proper dharma transmission, were acclaimed as acquiring 'wisdom without teachers' (wushizhi)." Hanshan's writings indicate that he seriously questioned the value of dharma transmission, seeing personal enlightenment as what truly mattered in Zen. As Wu observes, for Hanshan, "the enlightenment of the mind was more important than the nominal claim of dharma transmission. Because true enlightenment experience was valued, a few self-proclaimed Chan masters in the late Ming gained reputations as eminent monks without acquiring dharma transmission."

The Ming Caodong master Wuyi Yuanlai (1575–1630) believed that by his time all Chan lineages had already been broken. However, he felt that if one could realize one's own mind, and if this matched with their original understanding, the former Chan schools could still be considered present. On the other hand, he said giving dharma transmission just to keep Chan institutions alive was "adding water to dilute the milk." He felt having insight without formal transmission was preferable to having transmission without insight, as the former does no harm to the Dharma, while the latter deceives the Buddha, the world, and oneself.

The Japanese master of the Tokugawa period Takuan Sōhō believed the Dharma need not depend on an unbroken transmission from master to disciple. Like Ikkyū in the Muromachi period, Takuan refused to recognize an heir and chose instead to cut off his line, insisting the Dharma was always available to be discovered within by the right person. According to Haskel, Takuan's view was that "Zen mind exists any time a dedicated practitioner experiences realization, with or without a teacher's sanction and support." Takuan's refusal to pass on a lineage reflects a rejection of the view that "the torch of Zen" will be extinguished if it is not handed down in a master-disciple transmission. For Takuan, the truth of Zen cannot be destroyed since it is always present as the Buddha's original Dharma. It is enlightenment itself qua one's own intrinsic being, rather than some unbroken line of teachers and disciples, which is the true transmission that replicates and renews the experience of the Zen patriarchs. As such, Takuan stated, "That which is the Dharma cannot be passed on" and "That which can be passed on is not the Dharma."

Suzuki Shōsan, another master from the Tokugawa period, is an example of what is known as the "self-enlightened and self-certified" phenomenon (jigo-jishō 自悟自証). He had originally been a samurai who later became a Zen teacher. His independent enlightenment was defended in the Sōan zakki, a work by an anonymous author published fourteen years after Shōsan's death. There the question is raised whether Shōsan was a heretic since he did not receive transmission in any particular school of Zen but was rather "without a teacher and self-certified" (mushi-jishō). The text responds that the true meaning of mind-to-mind transmission is "knowing for oneself and attaining for oneself" (jichi jitoku), declaring that "To transmit some written statement or a robe is not the true Way."

The Tokugawa-era Sōtō master Dokuan Genkō (1630–1698) was scathingly critical of the dharma transmission method which he called "paper Zen." Dokuan also criticized secret oral transmissions, stating that such things were not the meaning of Zen's "special transmission outside the scriptures." (Note: Various Chan sources are critical of secret teachings. For example, Shenhui said: "When other masters are asked about this teaching, they do not explain but keep it secret. I am completely different—whether to many persons or few, I always explain it to everyone. [...] The teachings of the buddhas of the past have all been directed at the eightfold congregation; there has been no private teaching, no secret teaching." See also Zongmi's Chan Prolegomenon: "'Do those who at present transmit the dharma speak secret oral transmissions [miyu] or not?' I have now answered this question. The dharma is Bodhidharma's dharma. Therefore, those who hear it, however deep or shallow, are all benefited. It is just that in the past it was secret, whereas now it is open. Therefore, it is not called a secret oral transmission. Just because the name is different [from what it was in Bodhidharma's time] does not imply that the dharma is also different." And also the Extensive Record of Baizhang: "Question: Since high antiquity the ancestral schools have all had esoteric sayings handed down successor to successor; what about it? The master said, There are no secret sayings; those who come to realize thusness do not have a secret treasure." And see also the Platform Sutra: "...Huiming [experienced] a great enlightenment. He then questioned me again, saying, ‘Other than the secret words and secret intention [you expressed] just now, is there any other secret intention?’ I said, ‘What I have preached to you is not secret. If you counter-illuminate [your own original face you will realize that] the secret was on your side.’") According to Dokuan, "what is called Zen enlightenment is not dependent on another’s enlightenment. It is only what you realize for yourself, attain for yourself, just as you know when you’ve eaten enough rice to satisfy your hunger, or drunk enough water to slake your thirst." Dokuan's critique of the transmission system went as far as to claim that only those who were self-awakened actually had the wisdom of the Buddha:

In today’s Zen temples they transmit the robe and bowl [i.e., the symbols of the teacher’s transmission]; but while the name continues, the reality [of enlightenment] has long ceased to exist. Those who carry on the wisdom of the buddhas and patriarchs rely on themselves, being enlightened independently, without a teacher; so that even though the name has ceased, the reality itself continues.

Modern Chinese Buddhists like Tanxu, Taixu and Yinshun also criticized dharma transmission, seeing it as a Chinese invention that was not taught by the Buddha. Taixu held that the practice led to sectarianism, and Tanxu wrote that it contributed to the decline of Zen. Yinshun believed that the Dharma was not something that could belong to anyone and thus it could not be "transmitted" in a lineage.

=== Abuse scandals ===
In the USA and Europe dharma transmission is linked to the unofficial title roshi, older teacher. In the Western understanding roshis are "part of a tradition that imputes to them quasi-divine qualities," someone who "is defined by simplicity, innocence, and lack of self-interest or desire." Such idealization is connected to mythologized lineage claims going back to medieval China of a direct mind-to-mind transmission from one enlightened master to another by which a living teacher derives their prestige and privileged position. Nevertheless, contrary to how it has often been presented, the authorisation of teachers through dharma transmission does not mean that teachers are infallible, as is clear from the repeated appearance of scandals:

In this complicated world of living Zen, we can meet teachers guiding communities of practice with compassion and grace. But we also find Zen teachers having inappropriate sexual relationships, abusing the power dynamics of their relationships and otherwise acting in ways contrary to the mythic status of their positions as teachers. In recent years there have been a number of books and essays exposing the ills of Zen institutions east and west as well as the foibles of individual Zen teachers. Here in the west there are few lineages that have passed unscathed by scandals, mostly of a sexual nature. And in the east, particularly in the Japanese institutions, we've learned how masters and whole schools were at various times co-opted by the state, most notoriously in the years leading up to and including the Second World War.

According to Stuart Lachs, such scandals have been possible because of the status given to roshis by dharma transmission, and "a desire for the master's aura, recognition, and approval." Lachs explains that students often come to the practice with an idealized expectation of Zen teachers and a wish to encounter a certain mythology, without recognizing it as such. Instead, what is often encountered is just "another story of ordinary, flawed human behavior." Bodhin Kjolhede also observes the role the idealization of dharma transmission has played in enabling abuses. He remarks, "At one center in this country, the teacher urged his disciples, 'Just get Dharma transmission; once you get that, no one will be able to touch you.' This worship of formalized legitimacy invites abuses; once a teacher believes that 'no one can touch you,' he has all but granted himself moral license – with consequences that have proven damaging to Zen and Buddhism in general."

Additionally, with the idealization of the teacher through ideas of lineage and dharma transmission also comes the reification of the role and subordinate position of the student. Where the actions of a teacher, defined by the institutional role, are necessarily considered good and pure, critical thinking on the part of the student can be dismissed as ego-driven and self-centered. This creates an opening for all kinds of potential abuse. Consequently, students may become objectified as a means to achieve a teacher's ends, or fulfill their desires, whatever those may be. Additionally, while teachers are socially defined in idealized terms, they may be simultaneously aware of their own human shortcomings. In this sense, the consciousness of such a teacher is split, with the idealization producing an internal otherness and alienation. Such a teacher may come to actually disdain the student who accepts their idealized status, looking upon the student with contempt as one who is easily fooled, seeing them as an object to be used.

=== Dharma transmission as a social construct ===
According to Lachs, idealized concepts of lineage and dharma transmission (as well as ritual behaviors, like koan interviews) serve to legitimate hierarchical structures in Zen, giving undeserved levels of authority to Zen teachers. Students are expected to take it on faith that a teacher’s title implies their infallibility, demonstrating that despite Zen's self-definition as beyond words and letters, in terms of its hierarchical organization, words and titles matter a great deal. Lachs points out that the three terms, Zen master, dharma transmission, and Zen lineage, make up a conceptual triad which is used to establish institutional authority in Zen. As Bernard Faure observes, such terms acquire their definitions and significance within a particular discourse. Regarding the socially constructed nature of what is transmitted through master-disciple relationships in Zen Buddhism, Faure writes:

The definition of masters and disciples, and of what is supposed to be transmitted through them, is primarily social. Despite the constant reference to ultimate truth, it does not acquire its validity from some extra-social criterion but is closely related to status. [...] Chan masters [...] are not masters because they have realized the truth and can now teach it (although, of course, this may be the case); rather, they can teach the truth because, having been socially defined as Chan masters, what they teach has the performative power of being the truth. [...] [T]he 'master function' is a 'position' determined by the discourse; it is a function (and not a pure origin) of discourse. In this sense, its performative power requires a broad social consensus. [...] The increasing importance of title and rank in Chan, at first glance paradoxical in an antinomian teaching, can be interpreted as reflecting a shift in the locus of power—namely, that symbolic domination, initially located in the individual master, is now located in the institution.

Additionally, Alan Cole observes that the goal of Zen genealogical texts is to privatize enlightenment, which is presented as something no longer openly available to the general public, or to those lacking a lineage. Cole explains this as a kind of stealing of truth away from more public sources of enlightenment, which, among other things, include the Buddhist sutras. However, as Cole points out, this process requires the public's cooperation in an ideological exchange, acceptance of the lineage as a historical reality, and the desire of those outside the lineage to possess what the lineage has. In return for its gift of belief, the public is promised a kind of "partial sharing" in the universal good which the lineage claims to be in possession of. However, as Cole points out, "the prior moment of exchange—when the public verified and legitimized the lineage—is left unspoken, making the gift from the lineage look sublimely disinterested and benevolent." This serves to cloak the basic dependence of the lineage on the public. According to Cole, the lineage's privatization of truth depends on the presence of an "Other" who, as an outside observer and reader of Zen genealogical texts, accepts the lineage's authority as something prior to and behind the narrative and not merely in it.

=== Historical criticism ===
According to Mario Poceski, during the formative years of its development in the Tang era, Chan was a diffuse and heterogeneous movement which lacked rigid orthodoxy and an independent institutional structure. However, by the Song dynasty, Chan had formed into a "state-sanctioned orthodoxy with a narrow conception of religious authority." As Poceski observes, unlike earlier Chan in which charismatic monks challenged or reframed established religious norms, Song Chan became centered around the office of the Chan master, an officially certified religious functionary whose authority rested on an institutionalized lineage model. Such orthodoxy was further reinforced by fixed forms of practice and routinized modes of commentary on an authoritative canon. Additionally, transmission records were constructed which portrayed masters according to a predetermined style of Chan-like behavior, thus maintaining the fictionalized presentation of a distinct Chan persona.

With the growth of Chan as a distinct tradition came concerns about origins and legitimacy, and Chan thus became preoccupied with "convoluted processes of lineage construction" in an attempt to fashion a unique Chan identity. Sharf observes that the rise of Chan was closely associated with ideological tropes in which the authority of teachers was based on myths of lineal descent, and this involved "the production and manipulation of pseudo-historical lineages." Likewise, Foulk writes that lineages belong, either partly or wholly, to the realm of ideology and myths fabricated retrospectively to gain authority, political power, and patronage. For Poceski, at the heart of this was the image of the Chan master (chanshi 禪師) whose identity was based on membership in a distinguished group of religious virtuosos. As Poceski points out, well-known genealogical schemata were used to situate individual masters within illustrious spiritual ancestries, which served as sources of religious legitimacy and authority. According to Welter, historical accuracy was not the main motivating factor in the creative construction of lineal connections. Rather, transmission records were forged with an aim to elevate particular Chan factions, as well as their political supporters.

The notion of lineage evolved over time, and by the Northern Song it had become increasingly institutionalized. According to Poceski, preoccupation with lineage helped to create "an ahistorical sense of continuity" between the Chan of the Tang and Song dynasties, as it served to conceal certain paradigm shifts and ruptures that occurred during the Tang-Song transition. This illusion of continuity "obfuscates the very real and consequential differences that separate the dissimilar Chan traditions that flourished during the Tang and Song eras." By the Song, Chan had become increasingly embedded in sociopolitical structures. With the establishment of religiopolitical networks and linkages to nexuses of imperial power came important ramifications for teachings, practices, and institutions. For example, Foulk points out that monastic institutions were so controlled by the state that they were nearly an extension of the national polity, with matters of doctrinal orthodoxy even being decided by imperial edict.

As part of an effort to control and regulate Buddhism, Chan monasteries received official recognition by the imperial state, and government officials came to either influence or control the selection of abbots. At the same time, as the position of abbot required official membership in a Chan lineage, ambitious monks sought to obtain inheritance certificates (sishu 嗣書) to advance their careers, sometimes by dishonest means. Foulk observes the many abuses of this system recounted by Dōgen, and states that "inheritance certificates were routinely given to senior monastic officers, presumably so that their way to an abbacy would not be blocked." According to Poceski, inheritance certificates are a peculiar feature of Chan which were invented during the Song dynasty. Foulk also observes that inheritance certificates were not merely religious symbols, but were rather actual legal documents recognized by civil authorities. Foulk states that the Chan lineage was essentially a mythological entity that nonetheless became an institutional reality when the government officially recognized dharma transmission, which he explains as a kind of ritual reenactment of mythology involving an inheritance certificate. Poceski observes the way in which this overall situation reflects a routinization of charisma:

A major stipulation for all Chan monasteries, which de facto meant most public monasteries, was that the new abbot had to be recognized as an official member of a Chan lineage. Consequently, the Chan master came to act as a sanctioned religious functionary, a prominent prelate endorsed by the state, rather than an independent spiritual virtuoso whose authority was to a large extent based on his personal charisma and unique vision.

Moreover, Poceski points out that abbots enjoyed opportunities for personal enrichment as well as control of the monastery's finances. With this situation came certain abuses such as the selling of abbotships and the acceptance of bribes by officials who controlled the process of abbot selection. Similarly, Jørn Borup observes that in Muromachi Japan, "inka shōmei were said to shift hands whenever temples needed money or powerful individuals needed status or a religiously sanctioned 'passport.'" Later in the Tokugawa period as well, Michel Mohr points out that "the misuse of Dharma-succession practices had become a plague that affected the credibility of the entire Zen Buddhist clergy."

According to Lachs, dharma transmission has not always been based on the spiritual qualities or realization of the recipient. It has been given at times for various other reasons, such as securing political benefits to a monastery, perpetuating a lineage (even if the recipient has not awakened), and to imbue missionaries with authority in hopes of spreading Dharma to other countries. Lachs also observes that in modern Sōtō, temples are often kept within families, with dharma transmission functioning as a formality for abbots to pass temple control to their eldest sons (thereby securing a comfortable place of retirement for themselves).

== See also ==
- Wisdom without a teacher
- Lineage (Buddhism)
- Zen ranks and hierarchy

In other religions

- Apostolic succession
- Guru-shishya tradition
- Isnad
- Parampara
- Silsila
- Semikhah
