= Shihō =

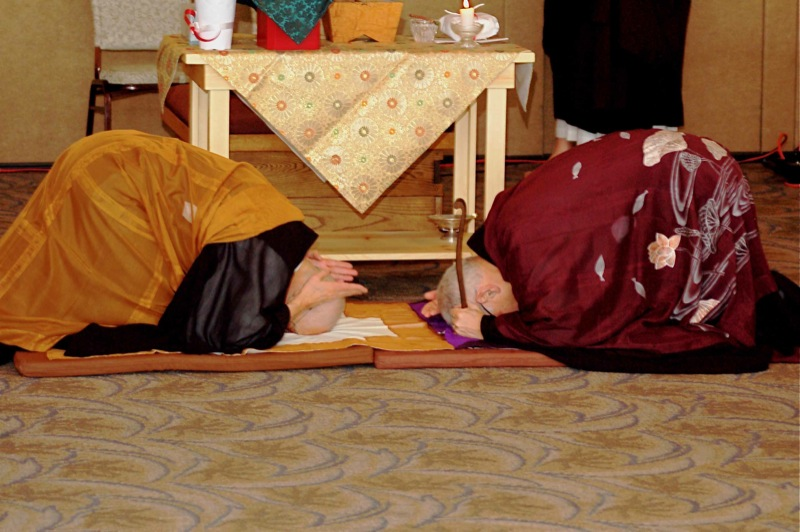
Michel Genko Dubois (left) and Dennis Genpo Merzel performing "mind to mind" in Dubois's shiho ceremony.

Shihō (嗣法) refers to a series of ceremonies in Sōtō Zen Buddhism wherein a unsui receives Dharma transmission, becoming part of the dharma lineage of his or her teacher.

== Ceremony ==
Shiho is done "one-to-one in the abbot's quarters (hojo)". (Note: Muho Noelke, Part 2: Ten points to keep in mind about dharma transmission)

Shiho, or denpo, is the Dharma transmission ceremony where the student inherits the Dharma, and is empowered to transmit the lineage. In the denpo ceremony, the student becomes an ancestor of the tradition and receives a robe and bowl, among other objects.

During the denpo ceremony the student receives a Shoshike certificate, which grants the power to perform Jukai, and the documents known as the "three regalia of transmission":

a) Shisho (the scripture of transmission, the names of the ancestors arranged in a circle – the dharma has passed on from to Shakyamuni to yourself, and now you give it back to Shakyamuni. There is a small piece of paper, probably originally written by Sawaki Roshi, with some comments. This paper is also copied by the student when doing dharma transmission at Antaiji.)

b) Daiji (the great matter, a cryptic symbolization of the content of the teaching. Again, there is a small extra sheet of paper that explains about the meaning of the symbols.)
c) Kechimyaku (the blood lineage, looks quite similar to the blood line transmission that you already wrote at the time of ordination)

d) Actually, in the lineage of Sawaki Roshi (and maybe other lineages as well) a student is told to write a fourth document on an extra sheet of paper, which is called Hisho (the secret document, which is encoded, but the code for deciphering is on the same paper, so once you hold it in your hands it is not so "secret" anymore.)

The Sōtō-shu also confers inka shōmyō (or inshō) "[granting] the seal of approval to a realization of enlightenment", upon students. This is an

... idealized religious aspect of the Dharma transmission process. Zen master and disciple may evoke this mystical paradigm through ritual ceremony in the master's room (shi-tsunai), but other, more mundane institutional concerns can govern the actual selection and promotion of Dharma 'heirs'.

In the White Plum Asanga, a shiho ceremony can last anywhere from one to three weeks. Prior to dharma transmission, transmission of the precepts from master to disciple, known as denkai, takes place, where the master confirms that the student is actualizing the precepts in his/her day-to-day life. In this ceremony the student "...become[s] the blood of the Buddha."

== Status ==
In the emerging western Zen-practice, after following completion of these ceremonies the teacher becomes independent.

This is quite distinct from the actual practice in Japanese Sōtō-zen:

[D]harma transmission provides access to only a relatively low grade. It is listed as a requirement for the very lowest ecclesiastical status, that of an instructor third class (santō kyōshi). Thus, in present day Sōtō Zen, dharma transmission constitutes a preliminary step, after which one's real development begins [...] Today, the key authority conferred by dharma transmission is that it qualifies a priest to manage an ordinary (jun hōchi) local temple. These temples are not ascetic training but of ceremonial services on behalf of lay patrons.

To supervise training monks, further qualifications are required:

The relatively low status of dharma transmission means that in and of itself it does not qualify one to accept students or to train disciples. According to the regulations, Zen students should be supervised only by a teacher who has attained supervisory certification (i.e. sanzen dōjō shike status), that is, someone who in the popular literature might be called a Zen master. To attain supervisory certification requires not just high ecclesiastical grades and dharma seniority but also at least three years' experience as an assistant supervisor at a specially designated training hall (tokubetsu sōdō), during which time one undergoes an apprenticeship.

However, in some Western Zen Centers, such as the San Francisco Zen Center, unsui in the process of achieving Dharma Transmission (Shiho), do in fact spend a number of years in a monastic training hall (Tassajara Monastery), undergoing apprenticeship. So in many ways, the San Francisco Zen Center has combined Shiho with Sanzen dojo shike, into a single transmission process.

== See also ==
- Dharma transmission
- Zen ranks and hierarchy
- Mushi dokugo
- Jukai

== Sources ==
- Anderson, Reb (2001). Being Upright: Zen Meditation and the Bodhisattva Precepts. Rodmell Press. ISBN 0-9627138-9-9.
- Bodiford, William M. (1991), Dharma Transmission in Soto Zen. Manzan Dohaku's Reform Movement. In: Monumenta Nipponica, Vol.46, No.4 (Winter, 1991), pp 423-451
- Bodiford, William M. (2008), Dharma Transmission in Theory and Practice. In: Zen Ritual: Studies of Zen Buddhist Theory in Practice (PDF), Oxford University Press
- Kay, David N. (2004). Tibetan and Zen Buddhism in Britain: Transplantation, Development and Adaptation. Routledge. ISBN 0-415-29765-6. OCLC 51315294.
- Loori, John Daido (1996). The Heart of Being: Moral and Ethical Teachings of Zen Buddhism. Tuttle Publishing. ISBN 0-8048-3078-9.
- O'Halloran, Maura (2007). Pure Heart, Enlightened Mind: The Life and Letters of an Irish Zen Saint. Wisdom Publications. ISBN 978-0-86171-283-0. OCLC 83977483.
- Spuler, Michelle (2003). Developments in Australian Buddhism: Facets of the Diamond. Routledge. ISBN 0-7007-1582-7. OCLC 49952207.
