= Laoshi =

Laoshi may refer to:

- The Chinese word for teacher (老師/老师), as transcribed in Hanyu Pinyin.
- Rōshi (Japanese word with the same Chinese characters), an honorific title used for a highly venerated senior teacher in Zen Buddhism.
