= Sokai =

Sokai may refer to:

- annual meeting (総会, sōkai) Economy of Japan
- Sokai, Zen ranks and hierarchy
- Sokai, Tibet, village in Tibet
