= Tachikawa-ryū =

Japanese school of esoteric Buddhism

The Tachikawa-ryū (立川流) was a branch of Shingon Buddhism founded in the early 12th century by Ninkan (仁寛, died 1114), a monk of the Daigo-ji lineage of Shingon who was exiled in 1113 to the province of Izu (part of modern Shizuoka Prefecture) after being implicated in a plot to assassinate the then reigning emperor of Japan, Emperor Toba.

During the late medieval period, the Tachikawa-ryū became notorious after monks of other Shingon lineages accused it of practicing heterodox rites involving sexual intercourse and skull worship, which contributed to its decline and subsequent dissolution during the Edo period. As many of the sect's documents were either lost or destroyed, for a long time knowledge of the Tachikawa-ryū was mostly limited to the writings of its opponents, and both scholarly and popular treatments of the sect took the polemics levelled against it by these authors more or less at face value. In recent years, however, its reputation has begun to see something of a rehabilitation after some advocated a reevaluation of the sect, its actual nature, and its role and impact in medieval (and later) Japanese Buddhism. These scholars argue that the term 'Tachikawa-ryū' actually encompasses a number of different groups not necessarily related to one another, and that the sexual rituals attributed to it was actually practiced by another group distinct from the lineage established by Ninkan.

== History ==
=== Ninkan ===
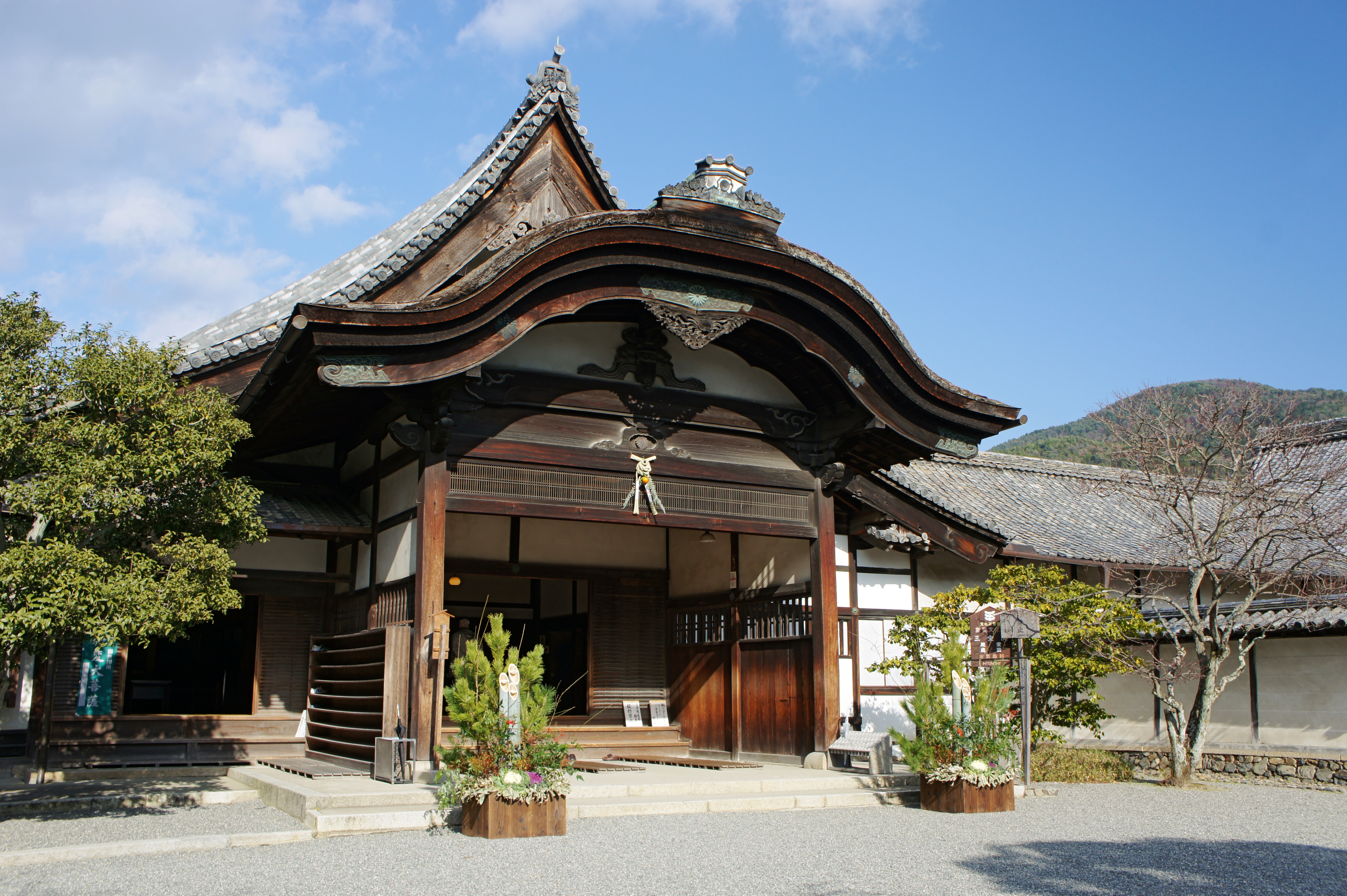
Sanbō-in, a sub-temple of Daigo-ji (Fushimi-ku, Kyoto)

The monk Ninkan was one of the sons of Minister of the Left Minamoto no Toshifusa (1035-1121). He was ordained in the Shingon temple of Daigo-ji in Kyoto and became a disciple of his elder brother Shōkaku (勝覚, 1057-1129), who had served as Daigo-ji's abbot since 1086. He later became a protector monk or gojisō (護持僧, a monk who performed rituals for the wellbeing of the imperial household) of Prince Sukehito (1073-1119), the third son of Emperor Go-Sanjō. The earliest literary reference to Ninkan is found in a chronological record of Muryōkō-in (無量光院), one of Daigo-ji's sub-temples, which states that Ninkan participated in a Buddhist service for the construction of a temple at Muryōkō-in in 1097 and then received the "Coronation of the Dharma-Transmission" from Shōkaku early in 1101. Other contemporary records that speak of Ninkan indicate that he was closely associated with Prince Sukehito and was mainly active in Ninna-ji.

After Go-Sanjō died in 1073, he was succeeded by his eldest son (Sukehito's brother by a different mother), who became Emperor Shirakawa. Although Go-Sanjō willed that Sukehito would later become emperor, Shirakawa wanted to put his own descendants on the throne, and his son was installed in 1087 as Emperor Horikawa, whose son later succeeded him in 1107 as Emperor Toba. Relations between Shirakawa, Toba and Sukehito were strained; in 1113, Toba excluded the prince from an imperial visit to Kitano Shrine. When the emperor became seriously ill soon afterwards, suspicion immediately fell on Sukehito and his preceptor monk after an anonymous letter was found in the imperial residence accusing Ninkan of conspiring with one of Shōkaku's pages, a young man named Senjumaru (千手丸), to kill Toba by placing a curse on him. The two were immediately arrested and sentenced to exile (Ninkan to Izu Province, Senjumaru to Sado Island) while Sukehito was placed under house arrest.

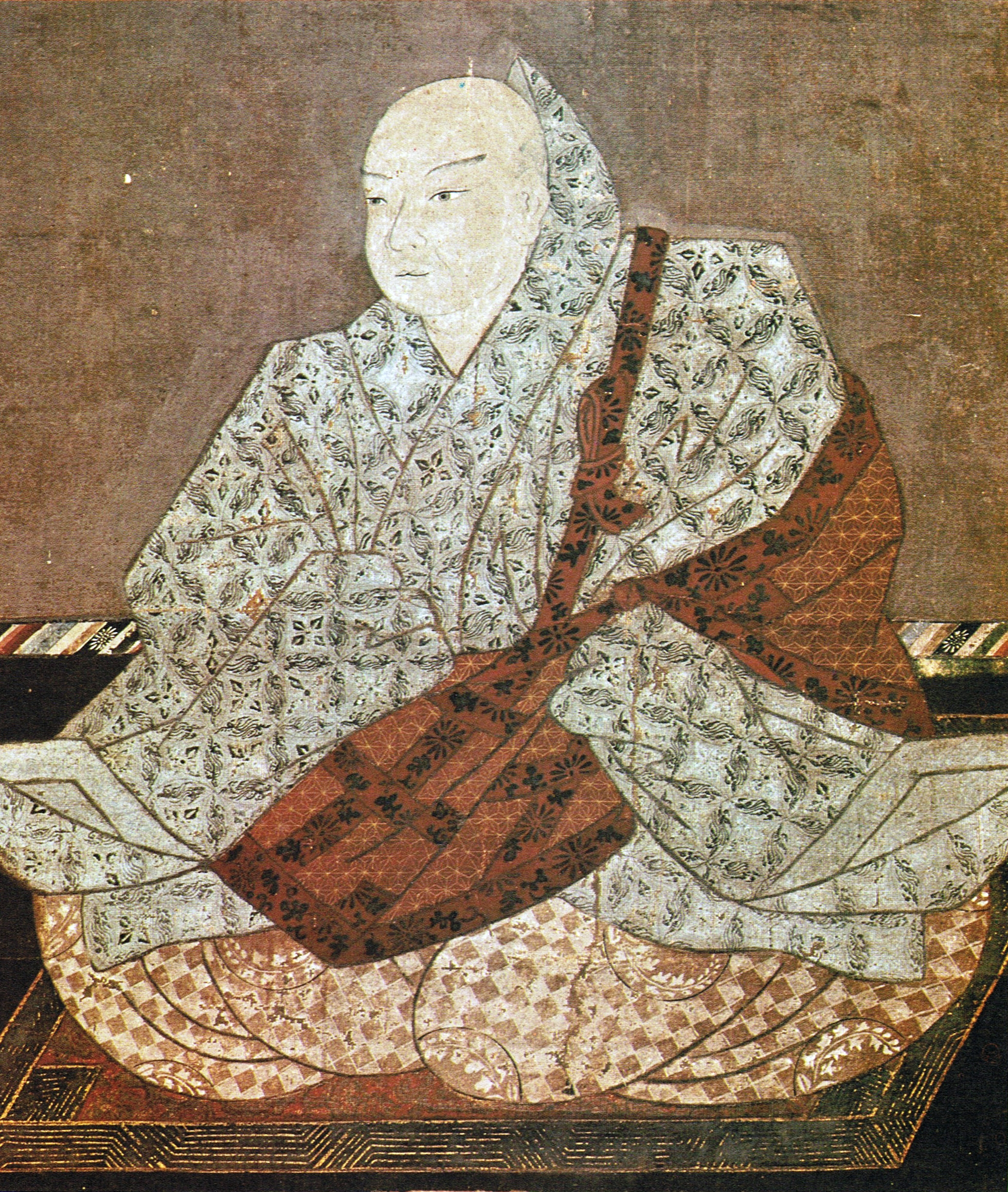
Emperor Toba

It is not known for certain what happened to Ninkan afterwards. Some sources state that he committed suicide in 1114, with one record from 1129 noting that Ninkan had not returned to the capital even then. Takuya Hino (2012), however, suggests that Ninkan might have become active as an astrologer under a different name during his exile; indeed, later texts state that Ninkan renamed himself Rennen (蓮念), and this name appears in the lineage charts (kechimyaku) of the Tachikawa-ryū. He points out that Fujiwara no Tadazane's (1078-1162) diary, the Denryaku (殿暦, covering the years 1098-1118), specifies that Ninkan was exiled to Ōshima Island in Izu, which was notable for being a place of exile for experts in divination.

Hino characterizes Ninkan as "a medieval astrologer who performed astrological and divinatory practices for the purpose of bolstering the court's authority and removing potential obstacles to the will of the imperial court and aristocracy" who was eventually "regarded as a political failure who had failed in his role as a protector monk and brought great confusion to the realm." Far from being a fringe practice, divination actually played a central role in not only the religious but also the political activity of the period: indeed, astrology dictated the daily lives and decision making of the Heian-era aristocracy. Many notable monastics of the Shingon and Tendai schools such as the Shingon monk Gihan (義範, 1023-1088), who was closely associated with Minamoto no Toshifusa's family and Daigo-ji (Shōkaku was in fact one of his disciples), practiced Chinese-influenced Buddhist astrology and divination (宿曜道, sukuyōdō).

Ninkan is believed to have established the Tachikawa lineage while in Izu. One of the Tachikawa-ryū's critics, a monk from Mount Kōya named Yūkai (宥快, 1345-1416), writes in his Hōkyōshō (宝鏡鈔, "Compendium of the Precious Mirror," 1375):

Some speak of the disciple (and natural brother) of Assistant Archbishop Shōkaku of Daigo-ji's Sanbō-in, a man called Ninkan Ajari (later known as Rennen). Apparently this man was exiled to Izu because of some criminal affair. There he taught Shingon to women and laymen who ate meat and practiced other filthy acts and made them his disciples. At the same place there was a Yin-Yang master (onmyōji) from Tachikawa in Musashi province. This man studied Shingon with Ninkan and brought to it his own Yin-Yang practices. Truth and heresy were thus entangled. Inner and outer were all mixed together. The result was called the Tachikawa sect, and was held up as a branch of Shingon. This was the wellspring of a river of heresy.

Despite such accusations of the lineage transmitting and performing perverse heterodox rituals, extant texts that can be traced to the sect do not contain any sexual teachings or material that could be seen as heretical, suggesting that the actual Tachikawa-ryū was a normal (if minor) branch of Shingon, an offshoot of the Daigo-ji lineage. Hino (2012) emphasizes that the astrological and divinatory practices actually performed by Ninkan's lineage "were a medieval Japanese esoteric praxis common to the many."

According to the sect's lineage charts, Ninkan (Rennen) was succeeded by four disciples, one of whom was named Kenren (見蓮). While later polemical texts such as Yūkai's tract quoted above claim that Kenren was formerly an onmyōji, and that the 'heretical' rites attributed to the sect were the result of his fusion of esoteric Buddhism and Onmyōdō, Kenryū Shibata and Nobumi Iyanaga (2018) have recently suggested based on surviving documents that Kenren was actually a monk from Kunō-ji (久能寺, now known as Tesshū-ji), a Tendai (currently Rinzai) temple located in modern Shimizu-ku, Shizuoka City, who possibly had connections with poet and nobleman (and later monk) Fujiwara no Norinaga (1109-?).

Shōbō (聖宝, 832-909) founder of Daigo-ji
Kangen (観賢, 854-925); 1st abbot (座主, zasu) of Daigo-ji
Jun'yū (淳祐, 890-593)
Gengō (元杲, 914-995)
Ningai (仁海, 951-1046) founder of Ono lineage (小野流, Ono-ryū)
Kakugen (覚源, 1000-1065); 12th abbot of Daigo-ji
Jōken (定賢); 13th abbot of Daigo-ji
Shōkaku (勝覚, 1057-1129); 14th abbot of Daigo-ji; founder of Sanbō-in lineage (三宝院流, Sanbō-in-ryū)
Ninkan (仁寛) aka Rennen (蓮念) founder of Tachikawa lineage
Kanshō (観照 / 観昭)	Kenren (見蓮)	Kanren (観蓮)	Jakujō (寂乗)

=== Criticism and decline ===
It appears from the historical record that Tachikawa-ryu was very widely accepted and practiced and by the middle of the 13th century during the Nanboku-chō period had become a major contender with the orthodox branch of Shingon. This marks what is considered the second period of the school. Beginning in the 13th century the orthodox branch of Shingon at Koyasan began a smear campaign against Tachikawa-ryu. This second period lasted until about 1500AD. The discrimination and attack by the orthodox branch at Koyasan reached its climax in about 1470AD.

From 1470 to 1500 marks the beginning of the third period, of the school. By this time the orthodox branch of Shingon had managed to formally denounce and excommunicate most teachings and practitioners of Tachikawa-ryu from its ranks. However, it was still very popular with the general populace. Tachikawa-ryu works were still published in works such as Sangi Isshin-ki (The Three Worlds Single Heart), Fudō-son Gushō (Humble Notes on the Immovable Lord), and Konkō-shō (Compendium of the Primal Cavity). Tachikawa-ryu ideas and influences also appeared in cultic practices with Dual Ganesha (双身歓喜天, Sōshin Kangiten) and Aizen Myō-Ō (Ragaraja), and in the other main orthodox school of mikkyo Tendai, in their extinct Genshi Kimyōdan cult. And also in the teachings and ideologies of Jodoshinshu (Pure Land Faith), especially the Himitsu Nembutsu (Secret Mystery of Mindfulness of Amida Buddha) developed by Kakuban and Dōhan.

== Skull ritual ==
Among the many rituals and rites claimed to have been practiced by Tachikawa-ryū was the Skull Ritual. Rituals involving the use of human or animal skulls are not uncommon. The exact origins of the Tachikawa-ryu Skull Ritual are unknown, but it appears from historical texts to be similar in ritual to Anuttarayoga tantras of Indo-Tibetan Vajrayana-tantra, in particular of particularly Hevajra Tantra and Candamaharosana Tantra. However, without further evidence no other conclusion as to its origin can be made.

The description of the Tachikawa-ryu Skull Ritual comes from unknown Shingon monk named Shinjō. Little if anything is known about Shinjō except what he writes about himself. The Skull Ritual is detailed in one of his works titled Juhō Yōjinshū (受法用心集), written about 1270 AD (Sanford 1991).

=== Notes on the ritual ===
The attribution of religious and magical powers to skulls is almost a universal trait. Nonetheless, it is especially prominent in tantric Buddhism. For example, the practitioners of the proto-tantric Kāpālikas (Kapalikas) often carried a staff with a skull on the end of it believing it gave them sidhhi (magical powers).

The use of hango-ko (frankincense) to call up the dead may trace back to the folk tale of the ancient Emperor Wu of the Han dynasty. There is also an equally apposite tantric usage to be found in the Hevajra Tantra where it describes the "mudra" (seal) as a ritual partner in a sex rite as a girl "possessed of frankincense and camphor", a characterization that turns out to be an encrypted reference for blood and semen (red and white). Regardless, the religious and magical powers of female blood and male semen (the Twin Waters, or the Red and White) is standard in the more baroque forms of Tantraism. An example is found in the Yoni-Tantra (vagina Tantra) of the Kaulas that recommends that, "...the highest sadhaka (officiant) should mix in the water the effusion from yoni (vagina) and lingam (penis), and sipping this amrita (nectar), nourish himself with it."

The idea of passing the smoke of incense through the eye holes of the skull is a reflection of the Buddhist belief that incense is pure until empowered by prayer or thought. Then once lit it is purified by the fire of Agni, and the pure distilled intention manifests as smoke which rises to the heavens. Thus by allowing the smoke to pass through the eyes (the eyes are the windows to the soul) the pure distilled intention is captured and condensed with the enclosed cranium of the skull.

== Modern times ==
For all practical purposes Tachikawa-ryu is extinct. It was outlawed in the 13th century by the Japanese authorities, and almost all of its writings were either burned, or sealed away at Koya-san and related monasteries. However, there have been claims that the school continued covertly until at least 1689, and some believe that it is still active today, in disguise.

== See also ==
- Daigo-ji
- Dakini
