= Flower Sermon =

Story of the origin of Zen Buddhism

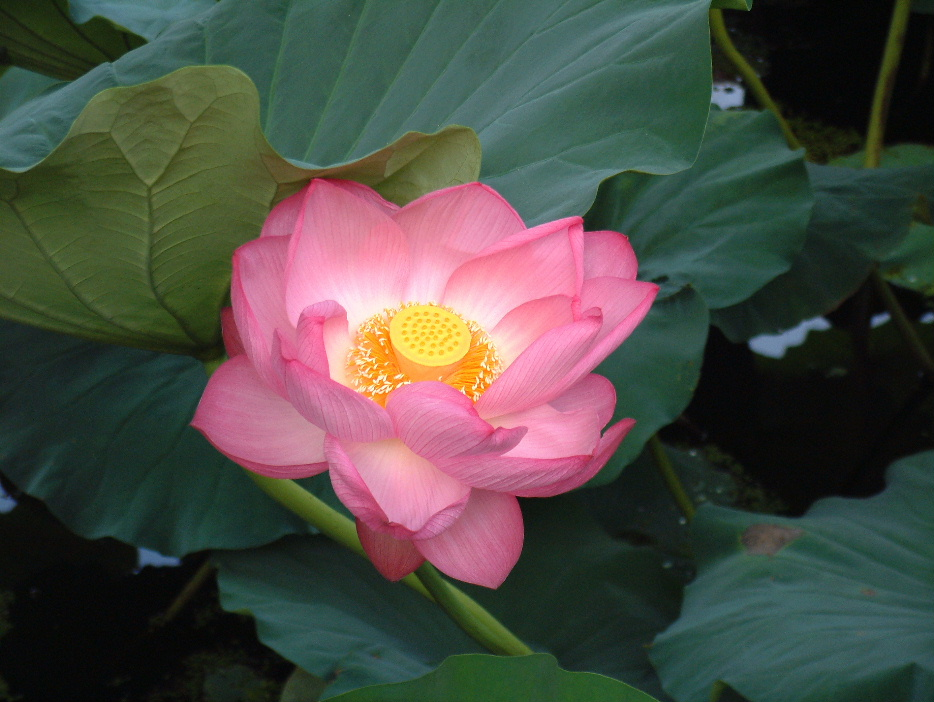
The lotus flower, the species of flower said to have been used during the Flower Sermon.

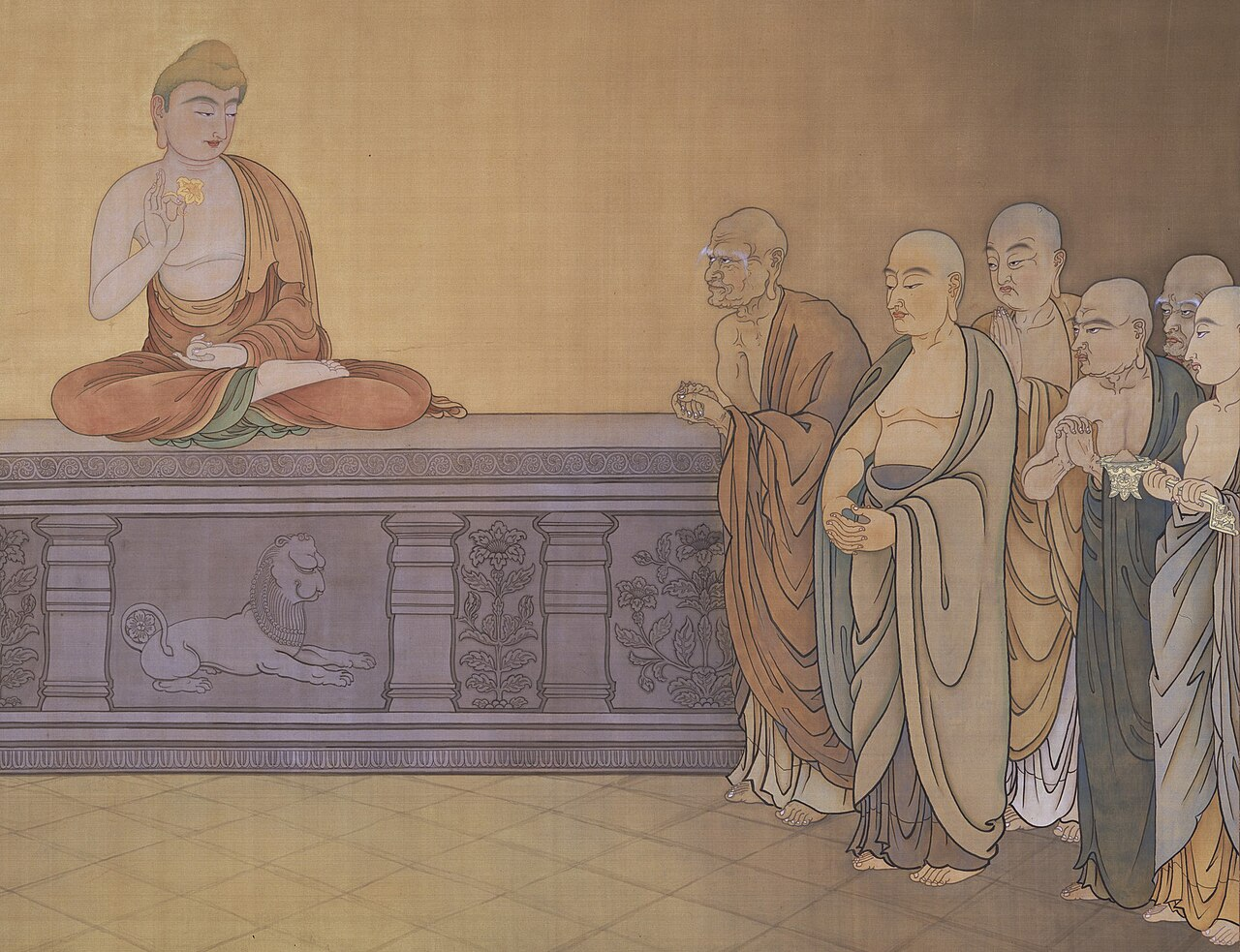
The Flower Sermon of the Buddha.

The Flower Sermon is a story of the origin of Chan and Zen Buddhism in which Gautama Buddha transmits direct prajñā (wisdom) to the disciple Mahākāśyapa. In the original Chinese, the story is Niān huā wéi xiào (拈花微笑, meaning "Picking up a flower and smiling"). It appears as Case 6 in the Zen koan collection, The Gateless Barrier (Wúménguān; Jap. Mumonkan).

== Content ==
In the story, the Buddha gives a wordless sermon to his disciples (sangha) by holding up a white flower. No one in the audience understands the Flower Sermon except Mahākāśyapa, who smiles. Within Zen, the Flower Sermon communicates the ineffable nature of tathātā (suchness) and Mahākāśyapa's smile signifies the direct transmission of wisdom without words. The Buddha affirmed this by saying:

I possess the true Dharma eye, the marvelous mind of Nirvana, the true form of the formless, the subtle dharma gate that does not rest on words or letters but is a special transmission outside of the scriptures. This I entrust to Mahākāśyapa.

== History ==
The story of the Flower Sermon appears to have been recorded by Chinese Chan Buddhists. The earliest known version of the tale appeared in 1036.

== See also ==
- Mahayana sutras
- Platform Sutra
- Southern School
