= Kechimyaku =

Japanese Zen Buddhist term

Kechimyaku (血脈) is a Japanese term for a lineage chart in Zen Buddhism and some other Japanese schools, documenting the "bloodline" of succession of various masters or listing priests in a particular school. In Zen, the kechimyaku theoretically links a student to all previous generations back to the Buddha himself. In the Sōtō school of medieval Japan, it became commonplace for the kechimyaku to be administered to lay students for such rituals as the jukai ceremony. Traditionally, this document is administered at the time of Dharma transmission in Soto Zen, during a shiho ceremony. In the Jodo Shinshu sect, the kechimyaku is meant to demonstrate "spiritual descent", and not a blood heritage.

== See also ==
- Dharma transmission
- Inka
- Shiho

== Sources ==
- Baroni, Helen J. (2002). The Illustrated Encyclopedia of Zen Buddhism. The Rosen Publishing Group, Inc. ISBN 0-8239-2240-5. OCLC 42680558.
- Plutschow, Herbert E. (1995). Japan's Name Culture: The Significance of Names in a Religious, Political and Social Context. Japan Library. ISBN 1-873410-42-5.
