= Rōshi =

Title in Zen Buddhism

Rōshi (老師) (Japanese: "old teacher"; "old master") is a title in Zen Buddhism with different usages depending on sect and country. In Rinzai Zen, the term is reserved only for individuals who have received inka shōmei, meaning they have completed the entire kōan curriculum; this amounts to a total of fewer than 100 people at any given time. In Sōtō Zen and Sanbo Kyodan it is used more loosely. This is especially the case in the United States and Europe, where almost any teacher who has received dharma transmission might be called rōshi, or even use it to refer to themselves, a practice unheard of in Japan.

== Etymology ==
The Japanese rōshi is a translation of the more antiquated Chinese Laozi (Wade-Giles; Lao Tzu) meaning 'Old Master' and connoting the archetype of a wise old man. The modern Chinese 老師/老师 (Chinese pinyin: Lǎoshī) is a common word for teacher or professor without the religious or spiritual connotation of rōshi. Chinese Chán Buddhism (Zen is the Japanese transliteration of Chán) uses the semantically related title 師父/师父 or Mandarin shīfu (Cantonese "sifu"), literally "master father" or "father of masters", or 師傅/师傅, literally "master teacher" or "teacher of masters"; both pronounced "shīfu" in Mandarin) as an honorific title for the highest masters, but it also may be used in respectful address of monks and nuns generally.

== Usage ==
Traditionally, the term rōshi has been applied as a respectful honorific to a significantly older Zen teacher considered to have matured in wisdom and to have attained a superior understanding and expression of the Dharma (Japanese: mujōdō no taigen) . Typically, a rōshi will have received dharma transmission (Jap: inka shōmei) many years ago and although often the abbot or spiritual director of a monastery may in fact be too old to carry these responsibilities.

Despite this historical reality, it has come in some modern Zen schools to be applied as a general title for a teacher regardless of the age of the individual who receives it. This is especially true in the United States and Europe where it appears that some confusion has arisen where the word rōshi has been conflated with the term oshō, which is the generic term for a Soto Buddhist teacher who has received shiho and completed her or his basic training. Historically, the term rōshi will only be applied to an oshō after they have given many years of service as a teacher.

=== Rinzai ===
In some Rinzai organizations, a monastic is sometimes called rōshi after they have received inka shōmei, meaning they have completed kōan study and received Dharma transmission from their master;

In Rinzai Zen, it is relatively easy to say who is a roshi and who is not. Anyone who is authorized by another roshi (i.e. his teacher) is a roshi. This authorization (officially the "inka-shômei" document) is documented on a piece of paper, that is why it is also called colloquially "ichi-mai", that is "one sheet (of paper)". The transmission is totally vertical from teacher to student, no peer control is involved. That means that the Rinzai sect has no means to control who is made a roshi and who is not. In spite of that, the number of Rinzai roshis is usually less than 100 at any given time. (Note: Muho Noelke, Part 10: What does it take to become a full-fledged Soto-shu priest and is it really worth the whole deal?)

According to roshi Sokun Tsushimoto, the title of rōshi is equivalent to Zen master and shike:

'Roshi' is the title compatible with the most formal title ‘Shike’ who got officially authorized as a Dharma successor by authentic master.

=== Sōtō ===
In the Sōtō organization, a person is sometimes called rōshi after they have received the title of shike, but this is by no means standard practice:

There are about 50 or so of these in Soto (the Rinzai roshis can also be addressed as "shike") [...] [T]here is a kind of committee, called the "shike-kai", consisting of all Japanese Soto shike. There is no foreign shike, as far as I know. The shike-kai can appoint anyone as a shike whom they consider their equal, i.e. who has done genuine training and study, cultivated himself and reached whatever understanding that might be considered enlightened enough to match the enlightenment of the other shike. So shike appointment can be called horizontal in a way.

=== Western Zen ===
Many Zen communities in the United States confer the honorific title of rōshi to their teachers as a regular title, in deference to perceived Japanese Zen tradition. In most western instances it is used synonymously with the term Zen master, which has a quite specific meaning in Japan, namely the select group of persons who are qualified to supervise the headtemples and monk training halls.

In the west, Rinzai and Soto-uses of the term have been mixed:

Rinzai Zen came first to the West, so a roshi was understood as someone who was a Zen master with certain credentials. With the introduction of Soto, the emphasis on personal relationship was grafted on, making a complex term that merged the official and legal with the personal and affectionate. To complicate matters further, the Diamond Sangha, the Los Angeles Zen Center and the Rochester Zen Center lineages have combined elements of both modern-day Soto and Rinzai Zen. It’s no wonder there is ambiguity and diversity in the usage of roshi in the West.

In the Sanbo Kyodan, a lay organization that combines Soto and Rinzai elements, a person is called rōshi when they have received inka, indicating they have passed the kōan curriculum and received Dharma transmission.

== Criticism ==
The use of the term rōshi in the U.S. and Europe has at times led to confusion and controversy. (Note: Muho Noelke, Ten points to keep in mind about dharma transmission) Stuart Lachs has argued that Zen institutions in the West have often attributed a mythic status to the title rōshi with harmful consequences. (Note: Richard Baker and the Myth of the Zen Roshi by Stuart Lachs, 2002)

== See also ==
- Dharma transmission
- Oshō
- Sensei
- Zen master
- Zen ranks and hierarchy

== Sources ==
- Bodiford, William M. (2008), Dharma Transmission in Theory and Practice. In: Zen Ritual: Studies of Zen Buddhist Theory in Practice (PDF), Oxford University Press
- Gard, Richard A. (2007). Buddhism. Gardners Books. ISBN 978-0-548-07730-6. OCLC 176932841.
- Katagiri, Dainin (1988). Returning to Silence: Zen Practice in Daily Life. Shambhala Publications. ISBN 0-87773-431-3. OCLC 16982186.
- Ogata, Sohaku (1975). Zen for the West. Greenwood Press. ISBN 0-8371-6583-0.
- Seager, Richard Hughes (1999). Buddhism In America. Columbia University Press. ISBN 0-231-10868-0. OCLC 40481142.
