= Zen ranks and hierarchy =

Zen institutions have an elaborate system of ranks and hierarchy, which determine one's position in the institution. Within this system, novices train to become a Zen priest, or a trainer of new novices.

== Sōtō ==
From its beginnings, Sōtō Zen has placed a strong emphasis on lineage and dharma transmission. In time, dharma transmission became synonymous with the transmission of temple ownership. This was changed by Manzan Dohaku (1636–1714), a Sōtō reformer, who...

[P]ropagated the view that Dharma transmission was dependent on personal initiation between a Master and disciple rather than on the disciple's enlightenment. He maintained this view in the face of strong opposition, citing as authority the towering figure of Japanese Zen, Dogen [...] This became and continues to this day to be the official Sōtō Zen view.

Sōtō-Zen has two ranking systems, hōkai (four dharma ranks) and sōkai (eight priest ranks).

=== Hōkai ===
The dharma ranks (法階) point to the stages in the training to become an Oshō, priest or "technologist of the spirit". (Note: James Ishmael Ford: Bodhisattva Ordination, Leadership Reform, and the Role of Zen Clerics in Japan) To become a dai-Oshō, priest of a Zen-temple, one has to follow the training in an officially recognized training centre, sōdō-ango (僧堂安居).

==== Jōza (上座) ====
Becoming a Sōtō-Zen priest starts with shukke tokudo (出家得度). In this ceremony, the novice receives his outfit ("inner and outer robes, belts, o-kesa, rakusu, kechimyaku (transmission chart) and eating bowls") and takes the precepts. One is then an Unsui, a training monk. This gives the rank of jōza, except for children under ten years old, who are called sami.

==== Zagen (座元) ====
The next step, after one has been a monk for at least three years, is risshin (立身) and hossen-shiki (Dharma combat ceremony), while acting as a shuso (首座), headmonk, during a retreat. Risshin is "To raise one's body into a standing position":

It means to gain physical stability. Confidence in oneself and one's role as a monk. The ability to express oneself and share a wider perspective, not restricted to one's own needs only. He starts to function like a pillar that supports the sangha.

Hossenshiki is a ceremony in which questions and answers are exchanged. After this ceremony, one is promoted to the rank of zagen.

==== Oshō ====
===== Shihō (嗣法) =====
The third step is shihō, or denpo, dharma transmission. Dharma transmission is...

...the recognition of the transmission that took place long before the ceremony itself. In fact, it has nothing to do at all with the paper, with philosophy or with mystical experience. The 24 hours of the daily life shared by teacher and student are the content of the transmission, and nothing else [...] In Antai-ji, when you receive shihō after, say, eight or nine years, you will have sat for 15,000 hours of zazen with your teacher. Not only that, you also shared many thousands of meals with him, worked together in the fields for thousands of hours, spread manure, cut grass and wood together, side by side, you sweat together in the summer and froze together in the winter. You cooked for him and filled the bath tub for him, you know how he likes the temperature both of his soup and the bathing water. You also shared many drinks, probably. In each of these activities, the dharma is transmitted. None should be left out.

Shihō is done "one-to-one in the abbot's quarters (hojo)". Three handwritten documents certify the dharma transmission;

a) Shisho (the scripture of transmission, the names of the ancestors arranged in a circle - the dharma has passed on from to Shakyamuni to yourself, and now you give it back to Shakyamuni. There is a small piece of paper, probably originally written by Sawaki Roshi, with some comments. This paper is also copied by the student when doing dharma transmission at Antai-ji.)

b) Daiji (the great matter, a cryptic symbolization of the content of the teaching. Again, there is a small extra sheet of paper that explains about the meaning of the symbols.)

c) Kechimyaku (the blood lineage, looks quite similar to the blood line transmission that you already wrote at the time of ordination)

d) Actually, in the lineage of Sawaki Roshi (and maybe other lineages as well) a student is told to write a fourth document on an extra sheet of paper, which is called Hisho (the secret document, which is encoded, but the code for deciphering is on the same paper, so once you hold it in your hands it is not so "secret" anymore.)

The procedure has to take place only once in one's life, and binds the student to the teacher forever:

Dharma transmission can happen once, and only once, or never at all. Multiple dharma transmission is nonsense. If you receive dharma transmission from one teacher, from then on that is your one and only teacher, your real teacher (jap. hon-shi). The multiple lineage holders that you hear of in the West are bullshit. Therefore it is important that both sides, but especially the student, make sure that this is the right time for them to make this important step.

If a student does not have the feeling he wants to be tied to this teacher for the rest of his life, he may refuse to take dharma transmission from this particular teacher. Since the time of Manzan Dokahu (1636–1714), multiple dharma transmissions are impossible in Sōtō Zen.

In contrast to the status that dharma transmission has acquired in the west, in Japanese Sōtō it has a relatively low status:

[D]harma transmission provides access to only a relatively low grade. It is listed as a requirement for the very lowest ecclesiastical status, that of an instructor third class (santō kyōshi). Thus, in present day Sōtō Zen, Dharma transmission constitutes a preliminary step, after which one's real development begins [...] Today, the key authority conferred by Dharma transmission is that it qualifies a priest to manage an ordinary (jun hōchi) local temple. These temples are not ascetic training but of ceremonial services on behalf of lay patrons.

Dharma transmission is not seen then as the end of the road; instead, it marks the beginning of deeper learning:

Dharma transmission is not the last and final step in a student's practice. Quite the opposite, one might call it the real first step on the way of practice. The way has just begun, but now the student has decided which exact way he wants to follow to the end. But all the real hardships still lay ahead of him. To use the example of boy-meets-girl again: At this point of time they have decided that they are made for each other, so to speak, they want to get married and have kids. Hopefully, that does not mean that the romance is over. It just means that both are prepared for the real struggle to begin. (Note: This is reflected by the Five ranks of enlightenment. The same notion can be found within the Rinzai-tradition. See Three Mysterious Gates, and the Four Ways of Knowing)

===== Ten-e (転衣) =====
To become an oshō, teacher, two more steps are to be taken, ten-e and zuise.

Ten-e means "to turn the robe":

Unsui (training monks) are allowed to wear only black robes and black o-kesa [...] [T]en-e is the point in the carrier [sic] of a Sōtō monk when you are finally allowed to wear a yellow-brown robe.

===== Zuise (瑞世) =====
The literal meaning of Zuise is as follows:

Zui means "auspicious", se is "the world". Originally, it seems that it meant the same as shusse, i.e. to get promoted to an office, to make a carrier step. Maybe it can also be interpreted as "to make an auspicious announcement to the whole world" or something along those lines.

Zuise is also called ichiya-no-jūshoku(一夜住職), "abbot for one night". In this ceremony, one is literally abbot for one night.

The ceremony originates in the medieval organisation of the Sōtō-shū, when rotation of abbotship was the norm. Dharma transmission at a branch temple obliged one to serve at least one term as abbot at the main temple. Abbotship gave severe duties, and financial burdens, for which reason many tried to avoid the responsibility of abbotship:

Tsūgen, Baisan and Jochū each demanded that future generations excommunicate any Zen teacher who failed to fulfill his obligation to serve as abbot of a head temple. Baisan decreed that the obedient Zen successors should seize defiant ones and then burn the offender's succession's certificate (shisho) before his eyes. Note the remarkable inversion that has occurred here. Instead of dharma transmission being a qualification for becoming an abbot, successful service as abbot has become a requirement for being allowed to retain one's dharma transmission.

The ceremony has to be done at both Eihei-ji and Sōji-ji, the main temples of the Sōtõ school, within the time span of one month. This originates in the rivalry between Eihei-ji and Sōji-ji. Eihei-ji's attempts to gain dominance were met with resistance from Sōji-ji. Several times in history Sōji-ji "has issued proclamations that anyone who received honors at Eihei-ji would never be allowed back at a temple affiliated with Sōji-ji". Since Sōji-ji has by far the largest network of temples, this was an effective means to limit the influence of Eihei-ji.

After zuise one becomes an Oshō, i.e. "priest" or "teacher".

==== Dai-oshō (大和尚) ====
After having become oshō one may become a dai-oshō, resident priest in a Zen-temple. It takes further training in a sōdō-ango, an officially recognized Sōtō-shū training centre. (Note: Muho Noelke, Part 5: Sessa-takuma - ango as life in a rock grinder)

A prerequisite to become dai-oshō is to do ango, "to stay in peace" or "safe shelter". It is derived from ancient Indian Buddhism, when monks retreated into shelter during the rain-season. Ango is a period of 90 or 100 days of intensive practice. There is no fixed stage on the training-path when ango has to be done, but ordination as a monk is necessary, and it has to be done in a sōdō-ango. The aspirant dai-oshō has to spend at least six months there, but one or two years is the usual span of time. Ango is necessary because it "grinds" the future dai-oshō:

The point of ango is: Sessa-takuma. I used this term a number of times in the past. It consists of four Chinese characters: 切磋琢磨 The first means to cut (a bone or elephant tusk), the second to rub, the third to crush (a stone or gem), the fourth to polish. As a whole, it describes how various hard materials grind each others and during this process are all refined [...] Ango is important exactly because it can be a pain in the ass to live with others who go on our nerves, occupy our space and demand our time, have different habits and different vies, different outlooks on life etc. They often show us a mirror because life in the monastery forces them to do so, when people in the world would just step out off our way.

Ango (安居) helps to become a mature person:

[T]hat is the real meaning of ango. Sharing all of your time and space and energy. Does it help to balance your nerves? In my case: Not always so. But it certainly helps to mature, and in my view, practice has something to do with being an adult.

After ango one can start to work in a temple. The newly acquired status is confirmed in the kyōshi-honin ceremony. There-after follows the first practice-period in one's own temple, with the aid of a susho (head monk). This is followed by the Jūshoku-himei ceremony, which confirms one's status as dai-oshō.

==== Shike (師家) ====
To supervise the training of monks, further qualification is necessary:

The relatively low status of dharma transmission means that in and of itself it does not qualify one to accept students or to train disciples. According to the regulations, Zen students should be supervised only by a teacher who has attained supervisory certification (i.e. sanzen dōjō shike status), that is, someone who in the popular literature might be called a Zen master. To attain supervisory certification requires not just high ecclesiastical grades and dharma seniority but also at least three years' experience as an assistant supervisor at a specially designated training hall (tokubetsu sōdō), during which time one undergoes an apprenticeship.

There are two grades for training supervisor, namely shike and jun shike. Appointment as shike is done by cooptation:

There are about 50 or so of these in Soto (the Rinzai roshis can also be addressed as "shike"). One big difference between the rinzai roshi and the Soto shike is that the shike transmission [...] is not vertical at all. That means that even if your teacher is a shike, he can not appoint you as a shike. So who does appoint a shike? In fact, there is a kind of committee, called the "shike-kai", consisting of all Japanese Soto shike. The shike-kai can appoint anyone as a shike whom they consider their equal, i.e. who has done genuine training and study, cultivated himself and reached whatever understanding that might be considered enlightened enough to match the enlightenment of the other shike. So shike appointment can be called horizontal in a way.

=== Sōkai ===
Promotion in priest-rank (僧階, sōkai) depends on school education and the amount of time spent in monastery training. There are eight ranks:

Rank	Ph.D. of Buddhist Studies at Komazawa Univ. or Aichigakuin Univ.	M.A. of Buddhist Studies at Komazawa Univ. or Aichigakuin Univ.	B.A. of Buddhist Studies at Komazawa Univ. or Aichigakuin Univ.	Other Univ.	High School	Junior High School
santō-kyōshi (3等教師, instructor 3rd rank)						
nitō-kyōshi (2等教師, instructor 2nd rank)	6 months	6 months	6 months	6 months	2 years	3 years
ittō-kyōshi (1等教師, instructor 1st rank)	6 months	1 year	1 year 6 months	2 years 6 months	4 years	6 years
sei-kyōshi (正教師, instructor proper)	6 months	2 years	3 years	4 years 6 months	7 years	10 years
gon-daikyōshi (権大教師, adjunct senior instructor)	On recommendation; at least 55 years old					
daikyōshi (大教師, senior instructor)	On recommendation; at least 60 years old; maximum number of 180					
gon-daikyōjō (権大教正, adjunct prefect)	On recommendation; maximum number of 30					
daikyōjō (大教正, prefect)	Abbots of Eihei-ji and Sōji-ji					

==== Kaikyōshi ====
A special title, Kaikyōshi (開教使), was created for foreign practitioners. It is not used anymore, having been replaced by the title Kokusai Fukyōshi. (Note: Sweeping Zen (2009), Myo Denis Lahey Interview) (Note: Myo Denis Lahey recalls: "Oh yeah, Dendo Kyoshi — that title has been abolished, actually. You know, there were a number of these designations that were thrown around, some lasting only a few months or a year before being discarded. Basically what the Japanese had was two sets of regulations—one for Japanese trained priests and then another set for Western priests. So, over the last five years or so, they’ve made a great effort to eliminate that split and have only one set of regulations. So, Dendo Kyoshi doesn’t exist anymore. So they probably shouldn’t be using that term anymore—now the term is something like kokusai fukyoshi. I think it means something like missionary teacher, or something like that. That is the designation for foreign trained priests, but within that there are several levels of teaching responsibility within the Sōtō hierarchy. So those of us who have kind of the tentative approval of the Japanese are considered nito kyoshi—which is kind of like a “second string” teacher (laughs). But one should point out that this is a pretty big thing, for the Japanese to even allow that to happen. So anyway, if anyone says to you they are a Dendo Kyoshi I think you should say to them, “Oh, you’ve been abolished.”") (Note: "Teacher who disseminates the dharma internationally".)

== Rinzai ==
At Myōshin-ji, two kinds of ranking systems are being used to rank sōryo ("a member of the educated clergy, a priest, as opposed to a monk"), namely the hokai (dharma rank) and the Tokyū-class system.

=== Hōkai ===
The hōkai (dharma rank) system is used to denote ranks in the Buddhist clerical career hierarchy. It has fourteen ranks and titles, starting with the shami rank. A central, but temporary phase in this career is the stay in a monastery for a few years. Half of the jūshoku (priests) connected to Myōshin-ji stayed there less than two years, and 10% even shorter than one year. The stay at the monastery is meant to learn the skills and social role necessary to function as a priest:

[T]he goal of Zen is not simply an inner state of tranquility but the social reconstruction of the self"

==== Shami ====
Ordination, called tokudo-shiki, usually takes place at a young age, between 6 and 20. Most of the ordained are temple sons, and often no special value is given to the ceremony. The time since ordination is the hōrō seniority, which is one of the factors in obtaining Tokyū-grades.

Lay-ordination into the Rinzai-school takes place through the jukai.

==== Jūshoku ====
The suiji-shiki ceremony is performed when one has finished the formal training period and is ready to start as assistant-priest, "often one's father temple". Afterwards, one gains the rank of oshō, priest.

In the Rinzai-school, a difference is made between acknowledgement of insight and succession in the organisation:

From the Rinzai perspective, true realization (jisshō) and succession to a master (shijō) are two different stages in the course of practice，the latter implying a comprehensive integration of awakening in the activities of everyday life.

The most common form of transmission in Rinzai Zen is the acknowledgement that one has stayed in the monastery for a certain amount of time, and may later become a temple priest.

After finishing the koan-study, further practice is necessary:

[I]t would take 10 years to solve all the kōans [...] in the sōdō. After the student has solved all koans, he can leave the sôdô and live on his own, but he is still not considered a roshi. For this he has to complete another ten years of training, called "go-go-no-shugyō" in Japanese. Literally, this means "practice after satori/enlightenment", but Fukushima preferred the translation "special practice". Fukushima would explain that the student builds up a "religious personality" during this decade. I would say it is a kind of period that functions to test if the student is actually able to live in regular society and apply his koan understanding to daily life, after he has lived in an environment that can be quite surreal and detached from the lives of the rest of humanity. Usually, the student lives in small parish temple during this decade, not in a formal training monastery.

==== Shike ====
Three of the highest ranks are shike ("Zen master" (of the training hall)), rekijō and tokujūshoku (kancō, abbot).

According to roshi Sokun Tsushimoto, the title of shike is equivalent to Zen master and roshi:

'Roshi' is the title compatible with the most formal title 'Shike' who got officially authorized as a Dharma successor by authentic master. (Note: For more information on Sokun Tsushimoto, see "Interview with Sokun Tsushimoto". (Note: The Japan Times online: Caring for body and soul. Interview with Sokun Tsushimoto))

The shike has received inka-shōmei or dharma transmission. Inka-shōmei is used for the transmission of the "true lineage" of the masters (shike) of the training halls. There are only about fifty to eighty (Note: Buddhadharma, Dharma Dictionary, Roshi) of such inka-shōmei bearers in Japan:

In Rinzai Zen, it is relatively easy to say who is a rōshi and who is not. Anyone who is authorized by another roshi (i.e. his teacher) is a rōshi. This authorization (officially the "inka-shōmei" document) is documented on a piece of paper, that is why it is also called colloquially "ichi-mai", that is "one sheet (of paper)". The transmission is totally vertical from teacher to student, no peer control is involved. That means that the Rinzai sect has no means to control who is made a rōshi and who is not. In spite of that, the number of Rinzai rōshi is relatively low, maybe around 50 or so. (Note: This is confirmed by Borup, who writes that "the most exciting and interesting part" of installing a master with rekijū rank was "when the master officially "revealed" the name of his own master, from whom he had earlier in a secret (and less formal) ritual of transmission (dentō sōshō no seishiki) received the certificate of enlightenment (inka-shōmei).)

Inka is usually attested by a written document:

[T]he full recognition conferred by a master upon a disciple whom he intends to make his successor [...] sometimes takes the form of written certification (inka)，but there have been cases of true acknowledgement in which no document has been bestowed.

According to roshi Sokun Tsushimoto,

Authorization as a Roshi should be done in the most formal and explicit way. In Rinzai tradition a master gives a calligraphy of Inka-certificate to disciple as a proof of authorization. Needless to say authorization must be backed up by the fact that the disciple spent many years in zen training under the master earnestly and continuously.

But according to Mohr,

In the Rinzai school the issue of Dharma transmission is essentially subjective, that is，left to the discretion of the master，and the ambiguity of terms such as “successor in the Dharma” (hassu 法B司) has persisted down to the present. According to the context or the circumstances, it can signify either spiritual recognition or inheritance of a temple lineaee.

The shike is not married. He...

[H]as the prestige and generally owns the respect of being a true Zen master, a living symbol of the Zen monastic tradition, the quintessence of Zen virtues ideally incarnating wisdom, spirituality, strict discipline, individuality, and yet gentle social personality.

The shike is also the head of the sect (subschool of the Rinzai-school, with its own head temple). He appoints and dismisses the priests, and appoints the titles in the ranking system. Yet, "the position as abbot [at Myōshinji] is based on election, each elected period lasting four years".

=== Tokyū ===
The Tokyū-class system is a teacher-grade system. Up to the second grade, progressing takes place through taking exams, or through mushiken kentei, authorization without examination. Age, seniority, amount of practice in the sodo, and educational level play a part in this authorization:

For instance, to become a shami one has to be at least five years old, and to get the title of Zenjūshoku one has to be at least forty years old and with a hōrō seniority of thirty years.

Rank	Buddhist studies department Hanazono University	Holding a PhD Any university	High School	Junior High School
Teacher assistant (three ranks)				
Tendoshoku (seventh-grade teacher)				
Sixth-grade teacher				
Fifth-grade teacher				
Tōdōshoku (fourth grade)				
Junjūshoku (third grade)				
Jūjishoku (second grade)	2 years	2 years	7 years	10 years
Zenjūshoku (first grade)				
Great teacher (dai kyōshi) (three ranks)	Abbot or University president			

A 'part-time' career program is offered by the ange-o-system, aimed at persons wishing to become full-time or part-time temple-priest, who don't have the opportunity to spend the required years in the sōdō.

Besides the official ranking, several honorific titles are being used:

- Oshō ("virtuous monk") is being used for an educated teacher (kyōshi) above Zendōshoku rank, "which most persons acquire by having spent a time in the monastery" Osho-san is used with respect and affection.
- Dai-Osho is not commonly used in Rinzai priesthood. It is respectfully used for deceased priests.
- Daizenji ("great master") is attached to the Oshō-title when someone has the Zenjūshoku or Dai kyōshi rank.
- Rōshi is used for a teacher of dai kyōshi grade, but also for older teachers. In the west the title rōshi has acquired the meaning of "enlightened Zen master".

== Sanbo Kyodan ==
The Sanbo Kyodan is a lay lineage mixing Soto and Rinzai-elements. Students in this school follow the Harada-Yasutani koan curriculum, in which great emphasis is placed on kensho, the initial insight into one's true nature. Having attained kensho is publicly acknowledged in a jahai-ceremony. After working through the Harada-Yasutani koan curriculum, which may take as short as five years, the student receives a calligraphy testifying that he or she "has finished the great matter". This is publicly acknowledged in the hasansai-ceremony, giving the status of hasan.

The Sanbo Kyodan has two levels of teaching authority, namely junshike ("associate zen master"), and shōshike ("authentic zen master"). Junshikes can give dokusan, authorize kensho, and supervise part of the koan-study. Shoshikes can supervise the advanced koan-study, and perform religious ceremonies, such as the precept-ceremony and wedding ceremonies.

The process toward gaining these titles has seen some variations within the Sanbo Kyodan. Hasansai may be preparatory to the junshike-title, but may also be the promotion to this title. And promotion to shoshike may be preparatory to dharma transmission, but may also be equivalent to it.

In dharma transmission, the student receives the sanmotsu, in a lay version of the Soto shiho ceremony. This is coupled with the Rinzai notion on inka. In Rinzai, only ordained priests who have completed the complete Rinzai koan curriculum and "are eligible to serve as sōdō roshi, that is, master of a training hall, in distinction from a common temple, receive inka. In the Sanbo Kyodan, inka is derived from Harada's Rinzai master Dokutan Sōsan.

== White Plum Asanga ==
=== Hoshi ===
In the White Plum Asanga, the first step in a practitioner's teaching career is to receive the rank of "Hoshi" or Dharma Holder. This usually signifies that the practitioner has completed all or a portion of the White Plum koan curriculum and can start giving Dharma talks and seeing students in private interviews under the supervision of their teacher. (Note: Evolution of the White Plum)

=== Denkai ===
The White Plum Asanga, consisting of Dharma heirs of Taizan Maezumi, recognizes denkai, transmission of the Bodhisattva Precepts, in advance of dharma transmission:

This authorizes them to give the precepts (jukkai) and to ordain (shukke tokudo), although not to give dharma transmission, themselves. (Note: Sweeping Zen, Denkai)

This precept-transmission has a long history in Sōtō-shu. Keizan, the fourth Sōtō-patriarch, received transmission of the precepts from Gien, the third (actually fourth) abbot of Eihei-ji, but received dharma transmission from Tettsū Gikai, the disputed third abbot of Enheiji. According to Keizan's Denkoroku, Dogen had received Dharma transmission from Rujing, bur precept transmission via the Rinzai-linegae of Myozen, with whom he first studied.

=== Denbo ===
In the White Plum Asanga, full Dharma transmission is conferred through receiving denbo. and qualifies one as a sensei. At this point a practitioner may give denkai and denbo to their students as they see fit.

=== Inka ===
Dharma Transmission may be followed by inka, the final acknowledgement:

… once you have transmission then your teacher is sort of watching to see how you’re doing as a teacher – on how you are conducting yourself and, after a period of time, if the teacher has confidence in your understanding and ability to teach (that you are conducting yourself with integrity and clarity) then, at some point, the person will get the final seal of approval – which is what inka is. There is nothing particularly mysterious about it. (Note: SweepingZen, Inka shomi)

== Kwan Um ==
The Kwan Um School of Zen (관음선종회) (KUSZ) is an international school of Zen centers and groups, founded in 1983 by Seung Sahn Soen Sa Nim.

There are four kinds of teachers in the Kwan Um tradition, all having attained a varying degree of mastery and understanding.

1. A Dharma teacher is an individual that has taken the Five precepts and Ten precepts, completed a minimum of four years of training and a minimum of eight weekend retreats, understood basic Zen teaching and has been confirmed by a Soen Sa Nim (Zen master) to receive the title. These individuals can give a Dharma talk but may not respond to audience questions.
2. A senior Dharma teacher is a Dharma teacher who, after a minimum of five years, has been confirmed by a Soen Sa Nim and has taken the Sixteen precepts. These individuals are given greater responsibility than a Dharma teacher, are able to respond to questions during talks, and give consulting interviews.
3. A Ji Do Poep Sa Nim (JDPSN; Dharma master; jido beopsa-nim; 지도법사님; 指導法師님) is an authorized individual that has completed kong-an training (having received inka), and is capable of leading a retreat. The nominee must demonstrate an aptitude for the task of teaching, showing the breadth of their understanding in their daily conduct, and undergo a period of teacher training.
4. A Soen Sa Nim (Zen master; seonsa-nim; 선사님; 禪師님) is a JDPSN that has received full Dharma transmission master to master.

An Abbot serves a Zen center in an administrative capacity, and does not necessarily provide spiritual direction, though several are Soen Sa Nims. These individuals take care of budgets and other such tasks.

== Criticism ==
The hierarchical system of Zen has attracted severe criticism in the west, because of the misconception of the role and degree of awakening of Zen teachers. The term rōshi has been applied to implicate a certified state of awakening, implying impeccable moral behaviour. Actual practice shows that this has not always been the case.

== See also ==
- Dharma transmission
- Zen master
- Rōshi
- Japanese honorifics

== Sources ==
- Bodiford, William M. (2008), Dharma Transmission in Theory and Practice. In: Zen Ritual: Studies of Zen Buddhist Theory in Practice (PDF), Oxford University Press
- Borup, Jørn (2008), Japanese Rinzai Zen Buddhism: Myōshinji, a Living Religion, Brill
- Dumoulin, Heinrich (2005a), Zen Buddhism: A History. Volume 1: India and China, World Wisdom Books, ISBN 9780941532891
- Dumoulin, Heinrich (2005b), Zen Buddhism: A History. Volume 2: Japan, World Wisdom Books, ISBN 9780941532907
- Faure, Bernard (Spring 1987), "The Daruma-shū, Dōgen, and Sōtō Zen", Monumenta Nipponica, 42 (1): 25–55, doi:10.2307/2385038, JSTOR 2385038
- Faure, Bernard (2000), Visions of Power. Imaging Medieval Japanese Buddhism, Princeton, New Jersey: Princeton University Press
- Ford, James Ishmael (2006). Zen Master Who?. Wisdom Publications. ISBN 0-86171-509-8.
- Lachs, Stuart (1999), Means of Authorization: Establishing Hierarchy in Ch'an /Zen Buddhism in America
- Lachs, Stuart (n.d.), Reply to Vladimir K.
- Lachs, Stuart (2006), The Zen Master in America: Dressing the Donkey with Bells and Scarves
- McRae, John (2003), Seeing Through Zen. Encounter, Transformation, and Genealogy in Chinese Chan Buddhism, The University Press Group Ltd, ISBN 9780520237988
- Mohr, Michel (1994), Zen Buddhism during the Tokugawa period: The challenge to go beyond sectarian consciousness. In: Japanese Journal of Religious Studies, vol. 21 no. 4, December 1994, pp. 341–72 (PDF), archived from the original (PDF) on 2011-08-11
- Odin, Steve (1994), The Social Self in Zen and American Pragmatism, SUNY Press
- Sharf, Robert H. (1995), "Sanbokyodan. Zen and the Way of the New Religions" (PDF), Japanese Journal of Religious Studies, 22 (3–4), doi:10.18874/jjrs.22.3-4.1995.417-458
- Tetsuo, Otani (2003), To Transmit Dogen Zenji's Dharma (PDF)
- Vladimir K. (2003), Tending the Bodhi Tree: A Critique of Stuart Lachs' Means of Authorization: Establishing Hierarchy in Cha'n/Zen Buddhism in America
