= Sensei =

East Asian honorific

Xiansheng

Chinese name
- Chinese: 先生
- Literal meaning: "[one] born before", "elder"
Transcriptions
Standard Mandarin
- Hanyu Pinyin: xiānshēng
- Wade–Giles: hsien^{1}-sheng^{1}
- IPA: [ɕjɛ́n.ʂə́ŋ]
Wu
- Romanization: shien san
Hakka
- Pha̍k-fa-sṳ: sîn-sâng
Yue: Cantonese
- Yale Romanization: sīn-sāang
- Jyutping: sin1 saang1
Southern Min
- Hokkien POJ: sian-siⁿ
- Tâi-lô: sian-sinn
Pu-Xian Min
- Hinghwa BUC: sĭng-săng
Middle Chinese
- Middle Chinese: sen-shang
Old Chinese
- Baxter–Sagart (2014): /*sˤər sreŋ/
- Zhengzhang: /*sɯːn sʰleːŋ/

Vietnamese name
- Vietnamese alphabet: tiên sinh
- Hán-Nôm: 先生

Korean name
- Hangul: 선생
Transcriptions
- Revised Romanization: seonsaeng

Japanese name
- Kanji: 先生
- Hiragana: せんせい
- Katakana: センセイ
Transcriptions
- Romanization: sensei

The term "先生", read sensei in Japanese, xiansheng in Chinese, seonsaeng in Korean, and tiên sinh in Vietnamese, is an honorific used in the Sinosphere. In Japanese, the term literally means "person born before another" or "one who comes before". It is generally used after a person's name and means "teacher". The word is also used as a title to refer to or address other professionals or people of authority, such as clergy, accountants, lawyers, physicians and politicians, or to show respect to someone who has achieved a certain level of mastery in an art form or some other skill, e.g., accomplished novelists, musicians, artists and martial artists.

== Etymology ==
The two characters that make up the term can be directly translated as "first born" and imply one who teaches based on wisdom from age and experience.

The word prefaced by the adjective 大, pronounced "dai" (or "ō"), which means "great" or "large", is often translated "grand master". This compound term, "dai-sensei" (大先生), is sometimes used to refer to the top sensei in a particular school or tradition, particularly within the iemoto system. For a more senior member of a group who has not achieved the level of sensei, the term senpai (先輩) is used – note the common use of 先 "before"; in martial arts, this is particularly used for the most senior non-sensei member.

== Use in Chinese ==
The Chinese use of xiansheng was a courtesy title for a man of respected stature. Middle Chinese pronunciation of this term may have been *senʃaŋ or *sienʃaŋ. In modern Standard Chinese, it is also used in the same way as the title "Mr". Prior to the development of the modern vernacular, xiansheng was used to address teachers of both genders; this has fallen out of usage in Standard Chinese, though it is retained in some southern Chinese Chinese varieties such as Cantonese, Hokkien, Wu, Teochew and Hakka, where it still has the meaning "teacher" or "doctor". In Japanese, sensei is still used to address people of both genders. It is likely both the current Southern Chinese and Japanese usages are more reflective of its Middle Chinese etymology. For Hokkien and Teochew communities in Singapore and Malaysia, "sensei" is the proper word to address school teachers. Traditional physicians in the Malay Peninsular and Singapore are addressed among locals with the Hokkien variant sinseh.

== Use in Buddhism ==
In Sanbo Kyodan-related Zen schools, sensei is used to refer to ordained teachers below the rank of rōshi. However, other schools of Buddhism in Japan use the term for any priest regardless of seniority; for example, the title is also used for Jōdo Shinshū ministers in the United States, whether they are ethnically Japanese or not. In the Kwan Um School of Zen, according to Zen master Seungsahn, the Korean title ji do poep sa nim is much like the Japanese title "sensei".

== See also ==
- Japanese martial arts titles
- Chinese: shifu
- Sanskrit: guru
- Zen ranks and hierarchy
- Mr.
- Shri
- Senpai
- Rōshi
