= Oshō =

Title for a Buddhist priest

Oshō (Japanese: 和尚) is a Buddhist priest (in charge of a temple); honorific title of preceptor or high priest (especially in Zen or Pure Land Buddhism). The same kanji are also pronounced kashō as an honorific title of preceptor or high priest in Tendai or Kegon Buddhism and wajō as an honorific title of preceptor or high priest in Shingon, Hossō, Ritsu, or Shin Buddhism.

== Etymology ==
Oshō is the Japanese reading of a Tibetan term meaning a high-ranking or highly-virtuous Buddhist monk. It is also a respectful designation for monks in general and may be used with the suffix -san.

According to the Kōjien Japanese dictionary and the Kanjigen dictionary of Chinese character source meanings, it is originally derived from the Sanskrit upādhyāya, meaning "master" in the sense of "teacher".

The literal meaning is "self-taught Buddhist monk/teacher" (Note: Oshobob, What is an Osho?) The Chinese term "he-shang" is derived from the Sanskrit word upadhyaya or acharya:

As the new Buddhist students and scholars, who eventually became teachers and practitioners, had to give a name to themselves, they came up with a name in Khotanese dialect that supposedly translated the Sanskrit word upadhyaya which meant 'teacher". It is also possible that it is a translation (or transliteration) of the Sanskrit word acharya, an Indian term with a broader connotation: a teacher of religion or the truth itself.

The standard English translation of oshō has become "priest", it has a somewhat different connotation in Zen:

While priest may be associated with ceremonial functions – which cause many Western Zen practitioners to balk – there is another way to read the term, simply as a "technologist of the spirit." Within the Zen tradition, this would suggest a certain mastery of one or more of the Zen arts of contemplation. If we consider the word priest literally means "elder," from the Latin presbyter, a Zen priest would be both a trained technologist of the spirit and an elder with the community. (Note: James Ishmael Ford: Bodhisattva Ordination, Leadership Reform, and the Role of Zen Clerics in Japan)

According to the Kōjien, the two characters that make up the word are pronounced oshō only in the Zen and Kegon schools. For example, they are read kashō in Tendai and wajō in Shingon Buddhism.

== History ==
Oshō became an honorific title for Zen-masters", meaning "harmonious respect":

When the Zen masters referred to themselves, or their disciples addressed them, they would often use this word, heshang. As it originally meant simply a "self-taught Buddhist monk/teacher" Zen masters would often speak of themselves in this vein - "this old heshang is going to sleep now."--indicating a kind of self-deprecation in front of their students - as if "I am just like you, not more advanced or better, just a student really." But as it is with disciples, this is hard for them to accept, the master is of course much more evolved, much higher. When a Zen disciple used this word heshang to address his master, it took on a much more reverential connotation, as if combining high respect and love simultaneously.

An example of its use is in Rinzai's teachings:

29.a. Followers of the Way, I hold the transmission of the generations from Mayoku Osho, Tanka Osho, Doitsu Osho, Rozan Osho, Sekikyo Osho. All have gone the same way. Nobody could believe in them, all were reviled.

Doitsu Osho's actualization was pure, it was not coarse. None of his three hundred or five hundred students could make out his meaning.
Rozan Osho was free and true, master of his actualization, whether adapting it or going contrary. But none of his students could fathom his vast horizon and were startled.

Tanka Osho played with the pearl (of wisdom, hidden in the sea), sometimes hiding it and sometimes revealing it. He was slandered by all students who came to him. (Note: Irmgard Schloegel, The Zen Teaching of Rinzai. Page 45)

== Sōtō Zen ==
In Sōtō Zen, to become an oshō, teacher, two more steps are to be taken after dharma transmission, namely ten-e and zuise.

Ten-e means "to turn the robe":

Unsui (training monks) are allowed to wear only black robes and black o-kesa [...] [T]en-e is the point in the career of a Soto monk when you are finally allowed to wear a yellow-brown robe.

After zuise one becomes an oshō, whereafter one may become the resident priest in one's own temple. Hereby one can gain the highest rank:

After you become the head priest at your own temple and hold a practice period there for the first time (with one student acting as the shuso), you will finally reach the highest rank of dai-osho.

To supervise the training of monks, further qualifications are necessary:

The relatively low status of dharma transmission means that in and of itself it does not qualify one to accept students or to train disciples. According to the regulations, Zen students should be supervised only by a teacher who has attained supervisory certification (i.e. sanzen dōjō shike status), that is, someone who in the popular literature might be called a Zen master. To attain supervisory certification requires not just high ecclesiastical grades and dharma seniority but also at least three years' experience as an assistant supervisor at a specially designated training hall (tokubetsu sōdō), during which time one undergoes an apprenticeship.

== Rajneesh ==
The term became well known in the West when Rajneesh began calling himself Osho.

== See also ==
- Osho (disambiguation)
- Dharma transmission
- Zen ranks and hierarchy
- Dharmabhāṇaka

== Sources ==
- Bodiford, William M. (2008), Dharma Transmission in Theory and Practice. In: Zen Ritual: Studies of Zen Buddhist Theory in Practice (PDF), Oxford University Press
- Ford, James Ishmael (2006), Zen Master Who?: A Guide to the People And Stories of Zen
- Shinmura, Izuru Ed. (1998), Kōjien. Fifth Edition, Tokyo: Iwanami Shoten
- Tōdō, Akiyasu Ed. (2007), Kanjigen. Revised Fourth Edition, Tokyo: Gakushu Kenkyusha
