= Zen master =

Zen Buddhist spiritual teacher

Zen master is a somewhat vague English term that arose in the first half of the 20th century, sometimes used to refer to an individual who teaches Zen Buddhist meditation and practices, usually implying longtime study and subsequent authorization to teach and transmit the tradition themselves.

== China ==
Until the Tang dynasty, the term "Chánshī" (禅师; Dhyana Master) was regularly used for a monk who was a master of chan, or meditation, versus those who specialized in Dharma (scriptural teachings) and Vinaya (discipline and moral precepts). This included several important figures who were later not considered to be part of the "Chán school" per se, such as Tiantai Master Zhiyi.

In contemporary China, the term "Chán" (禪), being simply one of many terms for forms of meditation, is not limited to the Chan school alone. The majority of lay people are not formally tied to a particular "school" of Buddhist practice. For monastics, most Chan practitioners receive transmission into certain Chan lineages, most commonly either the Lingji or Caodong lineage, which are the most dominant Chan lineages in modern Chinese Buddhism. Some senior practitioners may also have received transmission from lineages of other Buddhist schools, such as Tiantai and Huayan, in addition to Chan. Many temples belong to the Chan school in name, but also embrace and integrate teachings and practices from other Chinese Buddhist traditions, including those of Tiantai, Pure Land, Huayan, Tangmi, and Yogacara schools, often under the umbrella term "Chinese Buddhism" (中國佛教). This has been the norm for the past 1000 years, since the Song dynasty.

While there are no official organizations to regulate the use of honorary titles, "chánshī" is used as a title of respect for an adept, typically a monk, who specializes in Chán. "Chánzōng Dàshī" (禅宗大師; Great Master of the Chán School) is a similar and more specific honorary term, though rather rare. The same is true for the simple title "Dàshī" (大師; Great Master) which is rarely used to address a Dharma teacher (and any master of a specific craft or trade); the term is often bestowed posthumously by followers and students, although there are some exceptions (e.g. Hsing Yun).

The more common term when addressing a Buddhist master is "Shīfu" (師父; Master), which is also used for any monk or nun as a matter of respect. Strictly speaking, this term, which includes the relational term for "father" (父), refers more to one's own teacher or preceptor. The term "Fǎshī" (法師; Dharma teacher) is more generic, and is used both by lay Buddhists and also by Buddhists monastics themselves. The general term "Lǎoshī" (老師; Teacher) is also used to address a master as one's teacher, but this term is a general one, so much so that it is used for a teacher of any subject.

== Japan ==
There is no standard official title for "Zen Master" across the various Zen traditions in Japan. Various titles may be used:

- "Shike" is used for a select group of people, both in Rinzai and Soto, who are qualified to supervise the training of priests-to-be in the sodos, the training halls.
- "Rōshi" ("old teacher") is traditionally an honorific title given to older monks and Zen teachers in Japan, though both "sensei" and "roshi" have come to denote official or semi-official ranks within some Zen schools in Japan, the United States and Europe.
- "Sensei" (simply "teacher") is often applied in addressing the Zen teacher or "master".
- "Oshō", "virtuous monk/priest" is used for trainees who have acquired a basic level of priesthood.

=== Sōtō ===
In Sōtō Zen, the title "Dai-Osho" is the highest priestly rank in a clear monastic hierarchy. It is only surpassed by "Zenji" which is only applied to Dōgen and Keizan (the founders of the school), and to the current or former abbots of the two head temples of the sect. To supervise training monks, further qualifications are required:

The relatively low status of dharma transmission means that in and of itself it does not qualify one to accept students or to train disciples. According to the regulations, Zen students should be supervised only by a teacher who has attained supervisory certification (i.e. sanzen dōjō shike status), that is, someone who in the popular literature might be called a Zen master. To attain supervisory certification requires not just high ecclesiastical grades and dharma seniority but also at least three years' experience as an assistant supervisor at a specially designated training hall (tokubetsu sōdō), during which time one undergoes an apprenticeship.

=== Rinzai ===
In Rinzai too, further training is needed to be qualified as a supervisor. The common transmission does not include inka shōmei. Ideally inka shōmei is "the formal recognition of Zen's deepest realisation", but practically it is being used for the transmission of the "true lineage" of the masters (shike) of the training halls. Training halls are temples which are authorised for further training after being qualified as a temple priest.

According to roshi Sokun Tsushimoto, the title of roshi is equivalent to Zen master and shike:

'Roshi' is the title compatible with the most formal title ‘Shike’ who got officially authorized as a Dharma successor by authentic master.

There are only about fifty to eighty (Note: Buddhadharma Dictionary: Roshi) of such inka shōmei-bearers in Japan:

In Rinzai Zen, it is relatively easy to say who is a roshi and who is not. Anyone who is authorized by another roshi (i.e. his teacher) is a roshi. This authorization (officially the "inka-shômei" document) is documented on a piece of paper, that is why it is also called colloquially "ichi-mai", that is "one sheet (of paper)". The transmission is totally vertical from teacher to student, no peer control is involved. That means that the Rinzai sect has no means to control who is made a roshi and who is not. In spite of that, the number of Rinzai roshis is relatively low, maybe around 50 or so.

According to roshi Sokun Tsushimoto,

Authorization as a Roshi should be done in the most formal and explicit way. In Rinzai tradition a master gives a calligraphy of Inka-certificate to disciple as a proof of authorization. Needless to say authorization must be backed up by the fact that the disciple spent many years in zen training under the master earnestly and continuously.

The shike is not married. The shike...

[H]as the prestige and generally owns the respect of being a true Zen master, a living symbol of the Zen monastic tradition, the quintessence of Zen virtues ideally incarnating wisdom, spirituality, strict discipline, individuality, and yet gentle social personality.

The shike is also the head of the sect (subschool of the Rinzai-school, with its own head temple). They appoint and dismiss the priests, and appoint the titles in the ranking system. Yet, "the position as abbot [at Myōshinji] is based on election, each elected period lasting four years".

=== Women ===
Mugai Nyodai (1223 – 1298 CE), of Japan, was the first female Zen master in Japan.

== Korea ==
Sunim is the Korean title for a Buddhist monk or Buddhist nun of any tradition, and does not denote any specific rank or qualification. It is considered respectful to refer to senior monks or nuns in Korea as Kun sunim, and this polite way of expressing the title can also denote some sort of realization on the part of the individual being addressed. In most Korean temples, a middle-aged monk assumes the role of a juji sunim, who serves administrative functions. The eldest sunim is typically seen as a symbolic leader of the younger sunims.

In Korean Soen, Inka (In'ga) typically refers to the private acknowledgement of dharma transmission from a teacher to their student. "Transmission" is used to refer to the public ceremonial version of the same acknowledgement. Both are considered equal in authority and "realization". A monk with either In'ga or the public "transmission" is qualified to hold the post of Soen Sa, or "Zen Master" for a temple, and give transmission to their own students (either, In'ga or public "transmission"). The majority of Zen Masters in Korea have only received, and only give In'ga, with the formal transmission ceremony being far more rare.

In the Kwan Um School of Zen, founded by Korean Zen teacher Seung Sahn in America and Europe, a Zen master can be referred to as a Soen Sa Nim (seonsa-nim; 선사님; 禪師님; seon being Korean for "Zen"). Seung Sahn himself is usually referred to as "Dae Soen Sa Nim" (the honorific "Dae" means "great").

Kwan Um School of Zen is unique in the fact that it clearly distinguishes two "levels" of Zen teachers. "Lower" level is referred to as Ji Do Poep Sa Nim, or Dharma master (jido beopsa-nim; 지도법사님; 指導法師님). Ji Do Poep Sa Nim is a person who has received only Inka (which in Kwan Um School of Zen is given during public ceremony as well). They are allowed to teach, but only within the school - if a Dharma master decides to leave the school, their title and teaching authority is considered void. A Ji Do Poep Sa Nim also cannot give Inka to other individuals.

When a Ji Do Poep Sa Nim has their realization "confirmed" by several (typically three) Zen masters from outside the school, they become eligible for "full" transmission and the title of Zen master (Soen Sa Nim), which is given during another public ceremony. A Soen Sa Nim can give both Inka and transmission to other individuals and keeps their title and teaching authority if they decide to leave the school.

== Western culture ==
"Zen master" has been used to refer to individuals hailing from any number of countries and traditions. It is not an exact translation of any title from the countries from which Zen traditions emanate, where titles vary widely, even in different traditions from the same country. Its usage has diminished among contemporary American Zen teachers and practitioners.

The term has entered popular culture and has been used to refer to any number of public figures in sports and entertainment, denoting a person who demonstrates detachment and control in stressful situations. It was sometimes adopted by figures in the spiritual counterculture of the 1970s and 1980s who had little or no actual Zen training ("Zen Master Rama", "Osho") presumably to generate positive associations or legitimacy.

== See also ==
- Jisha
- Jikijitsu
- Sensei
- Oshō
- Zen ranks and hierarchy
- Phil Jackson
- Chinsō

== Sources ==
- Bodiford, William M. (2008), Dharma Transmission in Theory and Practice. In: Zen Ritual: Studies of Zen Buddhist Theory in Practice (PDF), Oxford University Press
- Borup, Jørn (2008), Japanese Rinzai Zen Buddhism: Myōshinji, a Living Religion, Brill
- Buswell, Robert (1992). The Zen Monastic Experience. Princeton University Press. ISBN 0-691-03477-X. OCLC 24953466.
- Daehang Sunim (2007). No River to Cross: Trusting the Enlightenment That's Always Right Here. Wisdom Publications. ISBN 978-0-86171-534-3. OCLC 133465561.
- Ford, James Ishmael (2006). Zen Master Who?: A Guide to the People and Stories of Zen. Wisdom Publications. ISBN 0-86171-509-8.
- Kwan, Okyun (2003). Buddhist and Protestant Korean Immigrants: Religious Beliefs and Socioeconomic Aspects of Life. LFB Scholarly Publishing LLC. ISBN 1-931202-65-6. OCLC 56995147.
- Seager, Richard Hughes (1999). Buddhism In America. Columbia University Press. ISBN 0-231-10868-0. OCLC 40481142.
