= Buddhist initiation =

Public ordination ceremony

The Buddhist initiation (Pali: Ārādhanā; Chinese: 受戒; pinyin: shòujiè; Japanese pronunciation: Jukai; Korean: 수계; romaja: sugye) refers to the public initiation ceremony wherein a lay follower of Buddhism takes refuge in the Triple Gem and receives certain Buddhist precepts. The particulars of the ceremony differ widely by country and by schools of Buddhism.

== Theravada Buddhism ==
In traditional Theravada communities, a non-Buddhist becomes a Buddhist lay follower (upasaka-upasika) by reciting the ancient formulas of the Three Refuges and the Five Precepts, either in response to a monk’s formal administration, (Note: A.G.S. Kariyawasam (1996). "Buddhist Ceremonies and Rituals of Sri Lanka, Chapter 1, "Initiation and Worship,"".) or by performing the recitation privately in front of a cetiya or an image of the Buddha. (Note: For example, see: Phra Khantipalo, "Going for Refuge". Archived from the original on 2013-10-02.; U Sein Nyo Tun, "The Light of Buddha: Ti-sarana, Vol. III, No. 10, 1958". Archived from the original on 2012-07-06.; The Ministry of Religious Affairs, Yangon (1997), "Teachings of the Buddha". Archived from the original on 2011-01-01.; "Buddhist studies, secondary level, becoming a buddhist". Archived from the original on 2020-10-10.; Blooming in the Desert: Favorite Teachings of the Wildflower Monk, p. 63, at Google Books) Newborns born to Buddhist parents are traditionally initiated by being taken on their first visit to a temple, typically on a full-moon or festival day, where they are presented to the Triple Gem.

Sometimes, within the monastic context, the term "initiation ceremony" may refer to the "ordination ceremony."

== East Asian Buddhism ==
=== China ===
In China, the ritual is called shòujiè (受戒). The character 受 means "receive," while 戒 means "precepts." Taken together, the characters translate as "initiated" or "ordained."

Many people believe in Buddhism but do not go through any initiation ceremonies. Such Buddhists make up the overwhelming majority. Only a small part of Buddhists have gone through the ceremony which makes the recipient an upasaka or upasika and accepted the five commandments. They are formal Buddhists.

Lewis Hodous, in his 1920 book Buddhism and Buddhists in China remarks on the Chinese ceremony as well, after recording an initiation ceremony for both those entering monastic life and the laity: "Less private was the initiation of the lay brethren and sisters, more lightly branded on the right wrist, while all about intoned 'Na-mah Pen-shih Shih-chia-mou-ni Fo.' (Chinese: 南無本師釋迦牟尼佛; pinyin: Námó Běnshī Shìjiāmóunífó; lit. 'I put my trust in my Original Teacher', 'Säkyamuni-Buddha.'

=== Japan ===
In Japan, the ritual is called jukai.

==== Sōtō school ====
In the Sōtō school in the United States, lay initiates take refuge in the Three Jewels (or Three Refuges—Buddha, Dharma and Sangha), the Three Pure Precepts (to do no harm, to do only good, and to do good for others) and the Five Grave Precepts—Affirm life: do not kill; Be giving: do not take what is not freely given; Honor the body: do not engage in sexual misconduct; Manifest truth: do not speak falsely; and Proceed clearly: do not cloud the mind with intoxicants. (Note: Lay Initiation Ceremony: Receiving Soto Zen Buddhist Precepts (Jukai), Atlanta Soto Zen Buddhist Center, American Soto Zen Buddhist Association)

==== Rinzai school ====
In the Rinzai school students take refuge in the Three Jewels (or Three Refuges) and, similarly to the Chinese and Korean practices derived from India, they receive the five precepts for laypersons.

=== South Korea ===
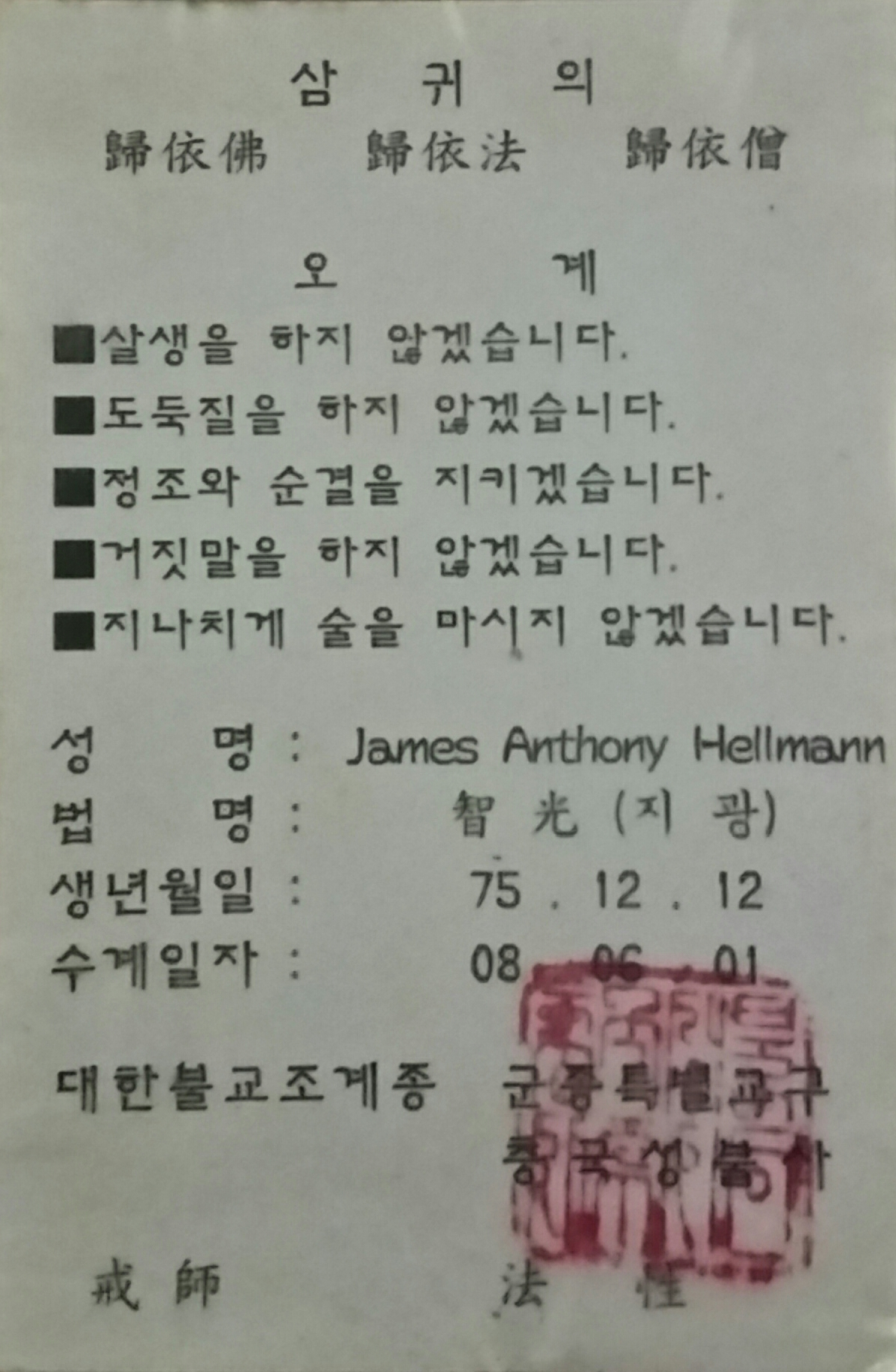
Ordination card given those joining the Jogye Order, bearing the ordained's new Buddhist name and signifying his/her commitment to keeping the Five precepts.

In South Korea, the ritual, called sugye (수계), involves formally taking refuge in The Three Jewels of Buddhism: the Buddha, the Dharma, and the Sangha, and accepting the five precepts. During the ritual, the initiate is touched with a burning incense stick. This is to leave a permanent mark which serves to remind the initiate of their promise to uphold the five precepts. During (or right after) the ceremony, the initiate is given a Buddhist name.

=== United States ===
In the United States, the predominant rite of receiving precepts is based on the Japanese Zen traditions. According to Seager, "jukai is a formal rite of passage that marks entrance into the Buddhist community. At that time, a student is given a Dharma name. He or she also makes a commitment to the precepts, which are interpreted a bit differently in various communities."

In the Diamond Sangha, jukai is "commonly practiced" though some members never undergo the ceremony because they are members of another religion which prohibits such initiations. Therefore, some would say, they are not Buddhist by definition.

At the Rochester Zen Center and its affiliated centers, the jukai ceremony involves taking the same precepts as in the Soto and White Plum traditions; however, from school to school or lineage to lineage, interpretation and translation of precepts can vary.

The White Plum Asanga follows the same ritual as the Japanese Soto-school.
