= Maurine Stuart =

Canadian Rinzai Zen master

- Title: Roshi

Personal life
- Born: March 3, 1922 Keeler, Saskatchewan, Canada
- Died: February 6, 1990 (aged 67)
- Other names: Ma Roshi; Mother Roshi; Maurine Freedgood

Religious life
- Religion: Zen Buddhism
- School: Rinzai

Senior posting
- Teacher: Soen Nakagawa; Eido Tai Shimano; Haku'un Yasutani

Maurine Stuart (3 March 1922 – 26 February 1990), a.k.a. Ma Roshi or Mother Roshi, was a Canadian Rinzai Zen rōshi who was one of the first female Zen masters to teach in the United States. She became president and spiritual director of the Cambridge Buddhist Association in 1979.

Stuart was granted her teaching title during an informal ceremony in 1982 held by her teacher Soen Nakagawa. Nakagawa, who had given Dharma transmission previously to five individuals (all male), granted Stuart the title in defiance of convention. While she had accepted the roshi title, she never declared to be a Dharma heir or lineage holder. The title was conferred upon her independent of her previous Zen practice and 1977 ordination as a Zen priest by Eido Tai Shimano.

== Biography ==
Stuart was born in Keeler, Saskatchewan, Canada in 1922. She studied music and graduated from the University of Manitoba.

Stuart moved to Paris, France in 1949 to study piano under Nadia Boulanger, Robert and Gaby Casadesus, and Alfred Cortot. While there she developed her interest in Zen Buddhism.

In 1966, Stuart joined the Zen Studies Society in New York City, then led by Eido Tai Shimano. She also practiced under Haku'un Yasutani for some time during this period. In 1970 she moved to Newton, Massachusetts and opened the Chestnut Hill Zendo—joining the Cambridge Buddhist Association not long after. She was ordained as a priest by Shimano in 1977.

Stuart is featured in Zen in America: Five Teachers and the Search for American Buddhism by Helen Tworkov. Tworkov reports that Stuart left the Shimano lineage in 1977 because of his mistreatment of women.

In 1979, Stuart became president and spiritual director of the Cambridge Buddhist Association.

In 1985, Stuart ordained Sherry Chayat as a Zen priest. In 1988, Stuart ordained Susan Jion Postal as a Zen priest. (See Empty Hand Zen Center site - emptyhandzen.org)

=== Death ===
Stuart died of liver cancer in 1990. She left behind no successors. As she wished, her ashes were buried under birch trees in the garden of the Cambridge Buddhist Association.

== Bibliography ==
- Stuart, Maurine; Sherry Chayat (1996). Subtle Sound: The Zen Teachings of Maurine Stuart. Random House. ISBN 1-57062-094-6. OCLC 34545428.

== See also ==
- Buddhism in the United States
- List of Rinzai Buddhists
- Timeline of Zen Buddhism in the United States
