= International Puppet Fringe Festival NYC =

Puppet theater festival in New York City, NY, US

The International Puppet Fringe Festival NYC (also stylised as IPFFNYC or Puppet Fringe NYC) is a biannual puppet theater fringe festival hosted by Teatro SEA on the Lower East Side of Manhattan in New York City. The festival had its 1st edition in 2018, at the Clemente Soto Velez Cultural and Educational Center, and featured puppet shows, short films and artist talks with international puppet theater companies. The Puppet Fringe Festival is the first ever international fringe festival dedicated to puppetry.

== 2018 Edition ==
In its inaugural year, the Puppet Fringe Festival held puppet cabarets hosted by the Puppetry Guild of Greater New York and Great Small Works, as well as an Artist Symposium hosted by UNIMA-USA, an international puppet union founded by Jim Henson in 1966. The Puppet Fringe Festival was produced by Manuel Antonio Moran, the Artistic director of Teatro SEA, and was held at the Clemente Soto Velez Cultural and Educational Center, from the 8 to 12 August 2018. The Puppet Fringe Festival hosted puppet companies from all around the world, including France, Canada, Puerto Rico and Costa Rica, as well as a handful of companies from the USA itself. The festival's international element was a key aspect of its appeal, with Time Out New York describing the festival as "a celebration of diversity, inclusion and of course beautiful performances".

The inaugural Puppet Fringe Festival was dedicated to José López Alemán, a Puerto Rican artist and Puppet Master for Teatro SEA who had worked in the puppetry industry for over 40 years.

Among the participating companies in 2018 were:

- Agua, Sol y Sereno (Puerto Rico)
- Chinese Theatre Works (USA)
- Compañía La Bicicleta (Costa Rica)
- Drama of Works (USA)
- La Tortue Noire (Canada)
- Les Anges au Plafond (France)
- Paper Heart Puppets (USA)
- Red Herring (USA)
- Wonderspark (USA)

== 2021 Edition ==
The 2nd International Puppet Fringe Festival NYC had to be postponed from August 2020 to August 2021 due to the COVID-19 pandemic. This festival was covered in a full-page article by the New York Times and other news outlets such as New York Theater. This edition had 5 days of in-person performances. It included more than 50 shows and events, short films, and art exhibitions. There was also a collaboration with the Museum of the City of New York and their "Puppets of New York" exhibit. The festival also provided adult workshops involving the construction of puppet construction.

Participating individuals and companies include:

- Deborah Hunt
- Bruce Cannon, artistic director of Swedish Cottage Marionette Theater
- Shari Lewis and Lamp Chop
- Chinese Theater Works
- Jim Henson Estate
- Ralph Lee
- The Manteo Family
- Derek Fordjour
- Nick Lehane
- Monxo López, Andrew W. Mellon Foundation fellow and Curator

== 2023 Edition ==
The 3rd International Puppet Fringe Festival took place from August 9 to 13, 2023, at the Clemente Soto Vélez Cultural and Educational Center in the Lower East Side. The festival adopted the theme "Halloween in August" to celebrate the legacy of master puppeteer Ralph Lee, who had died earlier that year in May. Lee was the founder of the Village Halloween Parade, and the festival's opening event featured an open to all procession on Suffolk Street modeled after his original parade, including his iconic puppets of Hades, the Fat Devil, and Yama (the Chinese Lord of Death).

The 2023 program included over 50 performances from a global lineup of artists, including:

- Scapegoat Carnivale (Canada): Performed Sapientia, a 10th-century play by Hroswitha of Gandersheim staged as "object theater," using household items like an espresso pot and teacups to represent characters.
- Yael Rasooly (Israel): Presented Paper Cut, a solo show utilizing vintage paper cutouts and magazine imagery.
- Puppet Beings Theater (Taiwan): Performed The Paper Play, marking the work's American premiere.
- Teatro SEA (USA): Debuted a bilingual musical adaptation of The Crazy Adventures of Don Quixote.

The festival also hosted two major exhibitions designed by Matthew Sorensen and curated by Ralph Lee's widow.: Myths, Legends and Spectacle: Masks and Puppets of Ralph Lee (viewable through August 31, 2023) and Theater Unmasked: Photographic Glimpses of Ralph Lee’s Work. Additional programming included film screenings from Heather Henson’s Handmade Puppet Dreams series and a roundtable discussion featuring Lee's, Mettawee River Theatre Company.

One of the 2023 International Puppet Fringe Festival most anticipated events was Microtheater performance. Microtheater are short, compact plays that are all performed in a small limited seating venue.

Participating individuals and companies include:

- Road of Useless Splendor – Deborah Hunt / Maskhunt Motions (Puerto Rico & New Zealand)
- Sapientia – Scapegoat Carnivale (Canada)
- The Trip – Treasure Chest Theatre (Hong Kong)
- Ramayana – Tholpavakoothu & Puppet Centre (India)
- Paper Cut – Yael Rasooly (Israel)
- Spooky-Silly Sing-A-Long – Nappy's Puppets (USA)
- The Crazy Adventures of Don Quixote – Teatro SEA (USA)
- Juan Bobo’s Tales – Teatro SEA (USA)
- The Journey of Pura Belpré's Tales – Teatro SEA (USA)
- The Paper Play – Puppet Beings Theatre (Taiwan)
- Iara the waters’ charm – Lumiato teatro de formas animadas (Brazil)
- The Possession of Judy – Boxcutter Collective (USA)
- Little Red's Hood – Swedish Cottage Theatre Mobile (USA) – (2 performances, Spanish & Mandarin)
- The Not-So-Spooky Ghost– WonderSpark Puppets (USA)
- Con un kilo de harina – Fernán Cardama (Argentina)
- Como Cucaracha en Baile de Gallina – Junktown Duende (USA-Puerto Rico-Mexico)
- The Galapagos Animal Convention – Teatro SEA (USA)

Microtheater Participants:

- La Mujer Barbuda/The Bearded Woman – Jei Fabiane (Colombia)
- Phantasmagoria – Cristina Arancibia (Chile)
- Por qué la luna perdió su brillo/Why did the moon lose its brightness? – Teatro 220 (USA)
- Barnacle Bill the Husband – Brendan Schweda (USA)

== 2025 Edition ==
The 2025 edition was postponed to 2026 due to renovations of the Clemente Soto Velez Cultural and Educational Center. The 2025 Edition will now take place on August 12–16, 2026.
