= Tworkov =

Tworkov is a surname. Notable people with the surname include:

- Helen Tworkov (born 1943), American Buddhist writer
- Jack Tworkov (1900–1982), American painter
