= Havredal Zendo =

Buddhist temple in Denmark

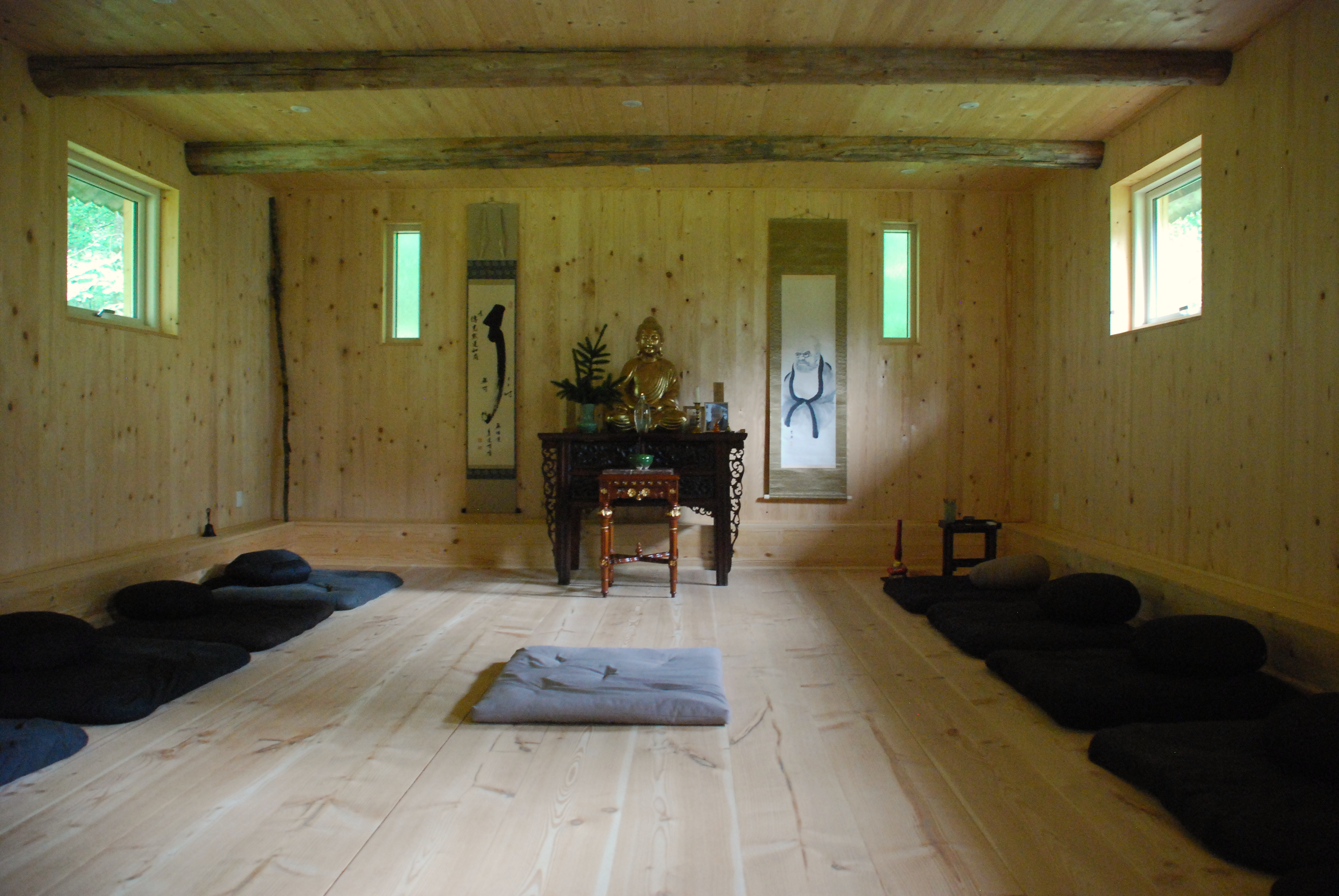
- Havredal Zendo internal

Religion
- Affiliation: Rinzai Zen Buddhism

Location
- Location: Stendalsvej 19, DK7470, Karup
- Country: Denmark
- Interactive map of Havredal Zendo

Architecture
- Founder: Choan Denko Mokudo Bertelsen (Egmund Sommer / Denko Møller / John Mortensen)
- Completed: 2015

Website
- buddhistisksamfund.dk/

Havredal Zendo (English: Oats Vally Zendo) - Cho-An is a Buddhist temple, in the Rinzai Zen tradition, founded by Choan Denko Mokudo Bertelsen (Egmund Sommer / Denko Møller / John Mortensen). Cho-An is the first Zen temple building to be established in Denmark.

Denko first became interested in Zen Buddhism in the late sixties in Denmark. He went to Ryutaku-ji in Japan, where he met Soen Nakagawa. Later he became a student of Soen's successor, Eido Shimano. Denko was ordained as a Rinzai Zen Buddhist priest on July 4, 1980 and received Dharma transmission from Eido in 2002.

Denko later broke with Eido Shimano and became an independent teacher.

Denko is a member of the American Zen Teachers Association.
