= Eddy Portnoy =

Eddy Portnoy is a specialist in Jewish and Yiddish popular culture.

== Biography ==
Portnoy earned a Master of Arts in Yiddish Studies from Columbia University in 1997 with a master's thesis that explored the lives and work of Zuni Maud and Yosl Cutler. He earned his PhD in Jewish History from the Jewish Theological Seminary of America in 2008. His dissertation explores cartoons in the early Yiddish press.

From 2008-2015, he taught as a lecturer at Rutgers University.

He currently holds the position of Senior Researcher and Exhibition Curator at YIVO, as well as YIVO’s Academic Advisor for the Max Weinreich Center.

=== Writing ===
Exhibitions he has created have been praised in major media outlets, and his articles on Jewish popular culture have been published in Polin, The Drama Review and the International Journal of Comic Art. Portnoy was also a contributor to The Forward and Tablet magazine.

Portnoy is the author of the bestselling book Bad Rabbi And Other Strange but True Stories from the Yiddish Press (2017, Stanford University Press), based on his doctoral dissertation. This book covers overlooked aspects of American and Polish Jewish society and culture, namely, the life of marginalized people, "the downwardly mobile Jews" based on the stories published in Yiddish newspapers of New York City and Warsaw. As Jack Fischel writes in his review, "He [Portnoy] admits that the stories are not representative of Jewry, but insists that in every society there is a group of people who are lowly, uncultured, uneducated, poor, and worthy of attention." The New York Times praised Bad Rabbi as "The Good Kind of Schmaltz," adding that the book contains "a succession of outlandish misadventures, a wild panorama populated by an astonishing array of characters."
