= Sherry Chayat =

American Zen Buddhist roshi

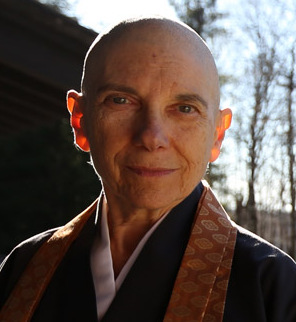
- Chayat in 2012

Personal life
- Born: 1943 (age 82–83) Brooklyn, New York
- Education: Vassar College
- Occupation: Roshi

Religious life
- Religion: Zen Buddhism
- School: Rinzai

Senior posting
- Based in: Dai Bosatsu Zendo Kongo-ji; Zen Center of Syracuse
- Predecessor: Eido Tai Shimano

Shinge-shitsu Roko Sherry Chayat (born 1943) is the former abbot of the Zen Studies Society, based at the International Dai Bosatsu Zendo Kongo-ji monastery, outside Livingston Manor, NY, and at the New York Zendo Shobo-Ji on the Upper east Side of Manhattan. She is also the abbot of the Zen Center of Syracuse Hoen-ji. Chayat is an advocate for the use of meditation in medical settings, with Hoen-ji running the program Well/Being Contemplative Practices for Healing for healthcare professionals.

== Biography ==
Sherry Chayat was born in Brooklyn, New York in 1943 and grew up in New Mexico and New Jersey.

She read her first book on Zen Buddhism while in the eighth grade, and decided she would one day study it abroad. During the 1960s, while attending college at Vassar College, she began an informal study of Buddhism by reading works by D.T. Suzuki, Alan Watts, and many others. She studied art at the New York Studio School for Drawing and Painting.

In 1967 she joined the Zen Studies Society in New York City, training under Eido Tai Shimano, Haku'un Yasutani and Soen Nakagawa—and was married to Lou Nordstrom by Shimano and Yasutani. She received the Dharma name Roko (meaning sparkling dew). The couple moved to Syracuse and Sherry Chayat left Zen Studies Society in the middle seventies. She joined a small sitting group that had been founded in 1972 by some Syracuse University graduate students and later became the group's leader.

In 1984 Roko invited Maurine Stuart Roshi to lead the first sesshin and in 1985 Maurine ordained her as a Zen priest. After Maurine's death in 1990 Roko resumed her studies at Dai Bosatsu Zendo Kongo-ji. She was reordained by Eido Shimano Roshi in 1991. In 1992 she was given teaching permission and then received Dharma transmission in 1998 from Shimano. She was the first American woman to receive transmission in the Rinzai school of Buddhism.

On October 12, 2008, after a 10-year process of advanced training culminating in a ceremony called shitsugo (literally “room-name”), she received the title of roshi and the name Shinge (“Heart/Mind Flowering") from Eido Roshi. It was the first time that this ceremony was held in the United States.

Sherry Chayat was installed as the second Abbot of Dai Bosatsu Zendo Kongo-ji on New Year's Day 2011.

Chayat remained the Abbott of Dai Bosatsu Zendo Kongo-ji until she retired in October 2023.

== Bibliography ==
- Stuart, Maurine (1996). Chayat, Sherry (ed.). Subtle Sound: the Zen Teachings of Maurine Stuart. Shambhala Publications, dist. Random House. ISBN 1-57062-094-6. OCLC 34545428.
- Chayat, Sherry (1994). Life Lessons: The Art of Jerome Witkin. Syracuse University Press. ISBN 0-8156-2617-7. OCLC 29259252.
- Nakagawa, Soen (1996). Kazuaki Tanahashi; Chayat, Sherry (eds.). Endless Vow: The Zen Path of Soen Nakagawa. Shambhala Publications. ISBN 1-57062-162-4. OCLC 33335342.
- Chayat, Roko Sherry ed. (2008). Eloquent Silence: Nyogen Senzaki's Gateless Gate and Other Previously Unpublished Teachings and Letters. Wisdom Publications. ISBN 0-86171-559-4

== See also ==
- Buddhism in the United States
- List of Rinzai Buddhists
- Timeline of Zen Buddhism in the United States
