= Soli Corbelle =

Art dealer

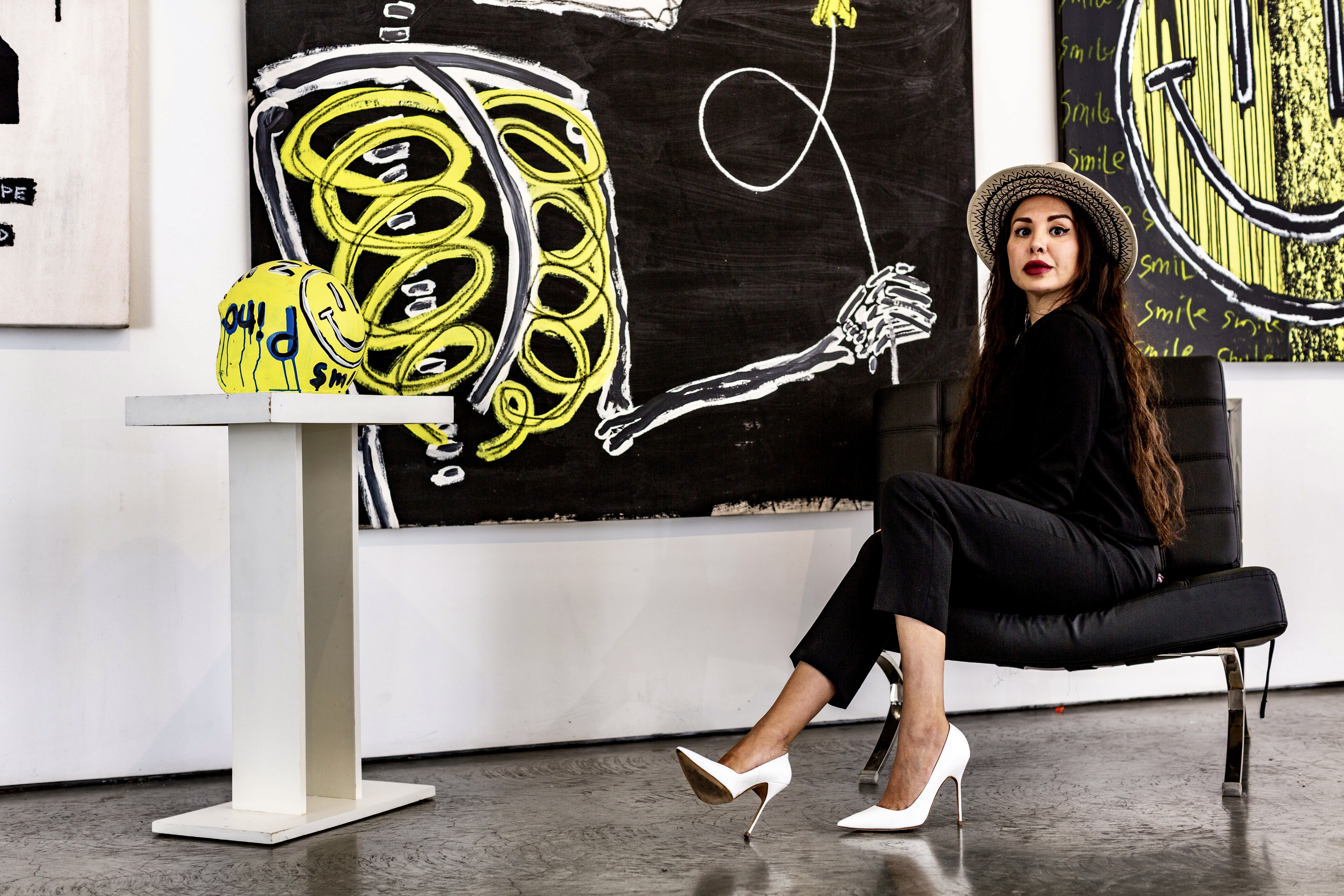
- Soli Corbelle, At Her Gallery in Chelsea, New York
- Born: Soli Corbelle; 18 March 1991 (age 35); New York City, United States
- Education: University of San Francisco
- Occupations: Art dealer and Gallerist

Soli Corbelle is an art dealer and gallerist.

== Early life ==
A New York native, Soli was surrounded by art from a young age, growing up in a household of collectors and attending weekly history classes at the Metropolitan Museum of Art.

== Career ==
Her early career began at the age of fifteen, garnering experience with a number of auction houses, museums and galleries including Phillips, Sotheby's and Museo Nacional Centro de Arte Reina Sofia. Her work extended to estates and artist studios by the likes of Jack Tworkov, and Harry Bertoia.

At age twenty-five, Soli became a Director of the New York flagship of an international gallery with over 15 locations worldwide. Two years later, She left to work as a private advisor for distinguished collectors across the globe before launching her first gallery group, LUSH Art Agency, with locations in New York and Miami. She has since opened a second gallery group and non-profit.
