= TEATRO SEA =

The Society of the Educational Arts, is a bilingual not-profit Art Education Organization is a theatre company founded in 1985 in Puerto Rico that produces socially conscious and educational productions for children and young adults.

SEA established operations in New York City in 1993, and has been producing plays since. SEA’s unique integration of the performing arts and Arts-in-Education programs introduces and enriches cultural awareness and a sense of identity, especially in children.

SEA has offices in San Juan and Florida, but its home base theater is located at Teatro SEA, at the Clemente Soto Vélez Cultural & Educational Center on the Lower East Side of Manhattan in New York City. At the Center, Teatro Sea offers a year-round season of professional Puppet and Children’s Theater, as well as Art & Puppetry Workshops. The organization also provides a Technical Training Program, sponsored by The Theatre Subdistrict Council, which aims to elevate the skill level of minority theatre technicians by giving them on the job training and real world working experience.

The Society of Educational Arts was founded by Dr. Manuel A. Morán, who currently is the CEO and Artistic Director.

== Repertoire ==
Teatro SEA has a vast repertoire of theatre and puppetry, for both children and adults. Every season (beginning in September until the end of May) Teatro SEA introduces new theatre and puppetry works, often based on Latin stories. Some of their most famous shows include A Tango-Dancing Cinderella, The Colors of Frida, Martina the Little Cockroach, My Superhero Roberto Clemente, and Sueño.

=== Children's series ===
- The Billy-Club Puppets / Los títeres de Cachiporra
- Legends of the Enchanted Treasure / Las leyendas del cofre encantado
- Martina, The Little Roach / La Cucarachita Martina
- The Belly-Ache Opera / La plenópera del empache
- My Superhero Roberto Clemente / Mi superhéroe Roberto Clemente
- The Toothache of King Farfán / La muela del Rey Farfán
- The Encounter / El encuentro de Juan Bobo y Pedro Animal
- A Tango Dancing Cinderella / Cenicienta Tanguera
- Ricitos and the 3 Bears / Ricitos y los 3 Ositos
- A Mexican Pinocchio! / ¡Viva Pinocho!
- The Dropouts Crew / Los Desertores
- Skeletons
- The True Story of Little Red / La verdadera historia de caperucita
- The Three Little Pigettes and the Big Bad Wolf / Las tres cerditas y la loba feroz

=== Small Puppet Shows ===
- The Colors of Frida / Los colores de Frida
- Pedro Animal Falls in Love / Pedro Animal se enamora
- The Pura Belpré Project / El proyecto de Pura Belpré
- My Magical Colombian Bus / Mi Chivita Mágica
- The Galápagos Animal Convention / La asamblea de animales de Galápagos

=== Adult Series ===
- Rafael Hernández... Romance
- A 3 Voces
- Sueño: A Latino take on Shakespeare's A Midsummer Night's Dream / Sueño: La versión latina de "Sueño en una noche de verano" de William Shakespeare
- The Gloria, A Latin Cabaret / La Gloria, un cabaret latino

== Festivals ==
Teatro SEA hosts several festivals on the Lower East Side, in which they celebrate Latino Heritage in their community and citywide.

=== Arte Pa' Mi Gente ===
Arte pa' mi Gente / Arts For All Festival is an initiative of Teatro SEA in collaboration with the Clemente Soto Vélez Cultural and Educational Center (The Clemente). This yearly festival is a free Outdoor Theater Series at La Plaza at The Clemente.

=== Micro Theater New York ===
Micro Theater New York, a weekend-long festival that provides an opportunity of alternative theatrical exchange for Hispanic groups and theater-makers in New York City. Each production is performed 5 times (5 shows) per night. Celebrated twice a year, each season with a new theme in collaboration with the festival's Co-Artistic Director George Riverón.

=== International Puppet Fringe Festival NYC ===
The International Puppet Fringe Festival NYC(also stylised as IPFFNYC or Puppet Fringe NYC) is a biannual puppet theater fringe festival hosted by Teatro SEA on the Lower East Side. The festival had its first edition in 2018, at the Clemente Soto Vélez Cultural and Educational Center, and featured puppet shows, short films and artist talks with international puppet theater companies. The Puppet Fringe Festival is the first ever international fringe festival dedicated to puppetry.

== Community Outreach Programs ==
=== Technical Training Program ===
The Technical Training Program, sponsored by The Theatre Subdistrict Council, offers free theater technical education to emerging theater artists and minorities. The trainees meet once a month with experienced industry professionals, where they learn Costume Design, Light Design, Scenic Design, Sound Design and other disciplines. They also have the opportunity to work on theater performances and festivals during their training at Teatro SEA.

== Awards ==
- A Tres Voces
  - HOLA Award - Best Production
  - Latin ACE Awards - Best Musical Production
- The Gloria, A Latin Cabaret
  - Latin ACE Awards - Best Production 2015
  - HOLA Awards - Outstanding Musical Production 2016
- The Billy-Club Puppets
  - Latin ACE Awards - Best Production 2014, Children Category
  - Latin ACE Awards - Best Artistic Direction 2014, Dr. Manuel Morán
  - HOLA Award - Best Production
- The Encounter
  - Latin ACE Awards - Best Production 2016, Children Category
  - Latin ACE Awards - Best Artistic Direction 2015, Dr. Manuel Morán
- The Three Piglets and the Big Bad Lady Wolf
  - HOLA Award - Outstanding Musical 2017
- Por El Monte Carulé
  - Latin ACE Awards - Best Production, Children Category
- Rafael Hernández... Romance
  - HOLA Award - Best Musical Production
  - Latin ACE Awards - Best Musical Production
- Sueño
  - HOLA Award - Outstanding Musical Production
  - HOLA Award - Outstanding Achievement in Technical Production/Design 2015
- UNIMA
  - UNIMA-USA - Citation of Excellence 2010, The Toothache of King Farfán
