= Gempō Yamamoto =

Japanese Zen Buddhist

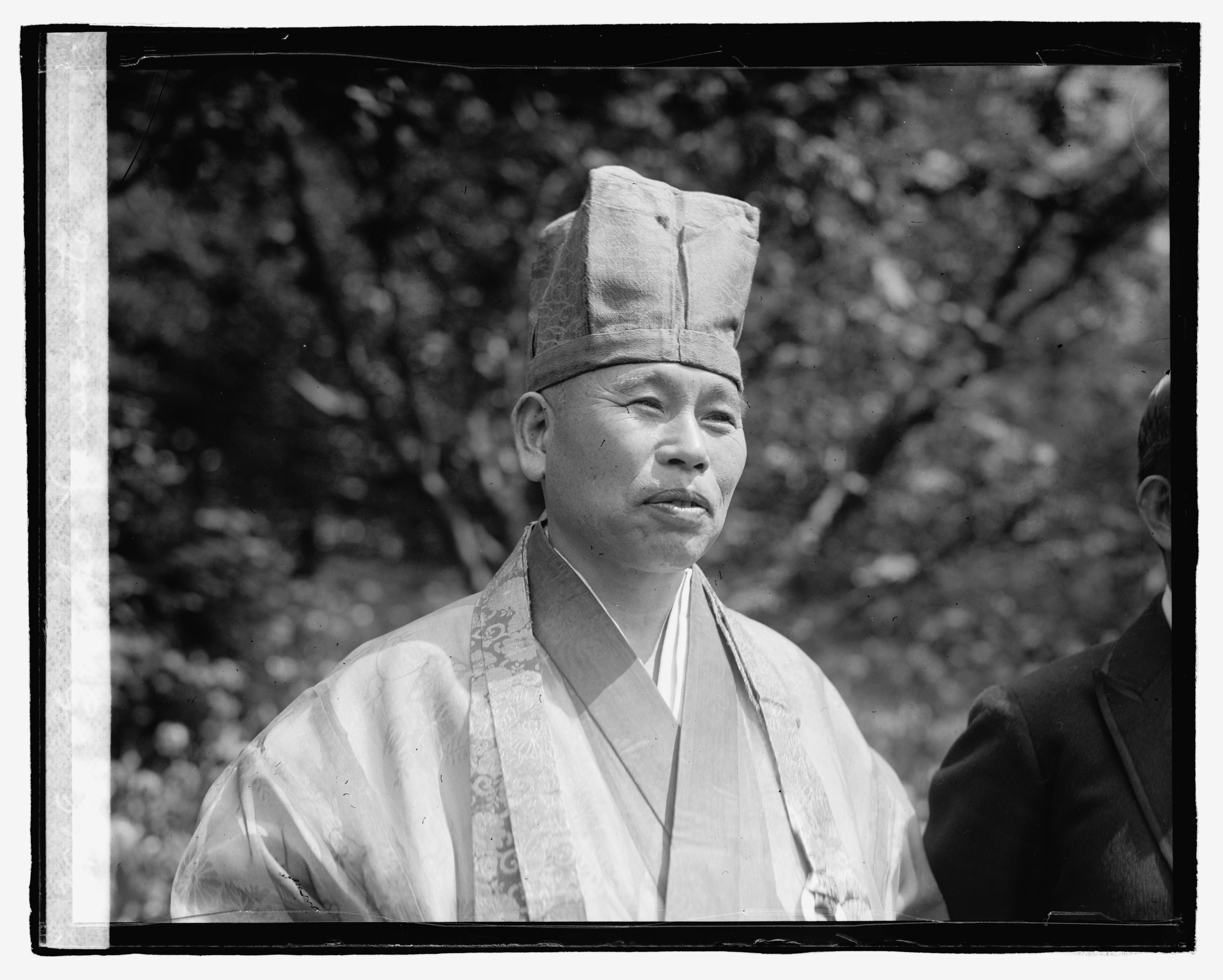
- Gempō Yamamoto in 1923
- Title: Roshi

Personal life
- Born: 1866 Wakayama, Japan
- Died: 1961 (aged 94–95)

Religious life
- Religion: Zen Buddhism
- School: Rinzai

Senior posting
- Successor: Nakagawa Soen, Nakajima Genjo

Gempō Yamamoto (山本玄峰, Yamamoto Genpō; 1866-1961) was the abbot of both Ryūtaku-ji and Shoin-ji in Japan—also serving temporarily as the head of the Myōshin-ji branch of Rinzai Zen Buddhism.

== Biography ==
A renowned Japanese calligrapher, Yamamoto was a Rinzai Zen Buddhist priest who followed in the footsteps of the famous Master Hakuin Ekaku. According to the book Zen and the Art of Calligraphy, Yamamoto is sometimes called the "twentieth century Hakuin". Like so many prolific Zen masters throughout the ages, Yamamoto had no formal education. By today's standards Gempō would be deemed legally blind, and it was not until later in life that he was able to write and read. At the age of 25 he became ordained as a monk, travelling during this period to various temples throughout Japan. Yamamoto is probably most remembered for his many zenga paintings, which can be found hanging at Ryūtaku-ji today.

He also produced a number of Inuyama ware.

In 1934, he testified in favor of his disciple Nissho Inoue, a militant Nichirenist preacher, during the trial for the League of Blood assassinations. He remained close to Inoue until Inoue's death in 1961.

== Bibliography ==
- Gempō Yamamoto, 慧開, Ekaku (1962). Mumonkan teishō: fu, Hakuin Zenji rōhachi jishū teishō. Daihōrinkaku.

== See also ==
- Buddhism in Japan
