= Zuni Maud =

American puppeteer

Zuni Maud (born Yitzhok Moyed; 1891 – 1956) was a Yiddish-American cartoonist, puppeterist, satirist, calligrapher, socialist-leaning political activist and co-founder of Modicut, the first Yiddish-language satirical puppet theatre in the United States.

Maud, circa 1930

== Early life and education ==
Zuni Maud was born Yitzhok Moyed in Russia, in the rural shtetl of Wasilków, in what is now Poland. His father was a gabbai. He studied at kheder, yeshiva and talmid toyres in Bialystok, Bielsk and Warsaw. While at these schools he would illustrate the studied Jewish texts, leading to disciplinary problems.

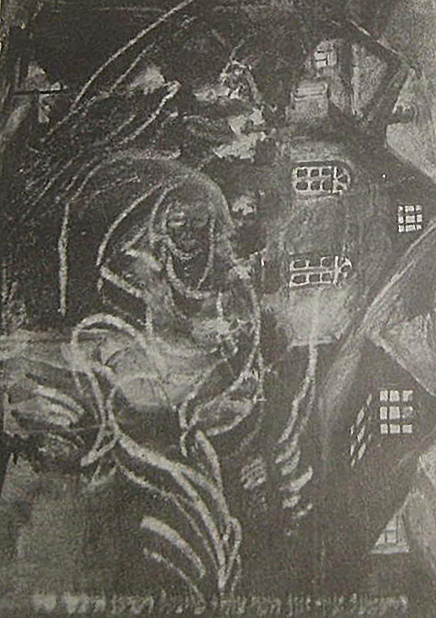
Zuni Maud, illustration in Yiddish language children's book, 1918; cropped

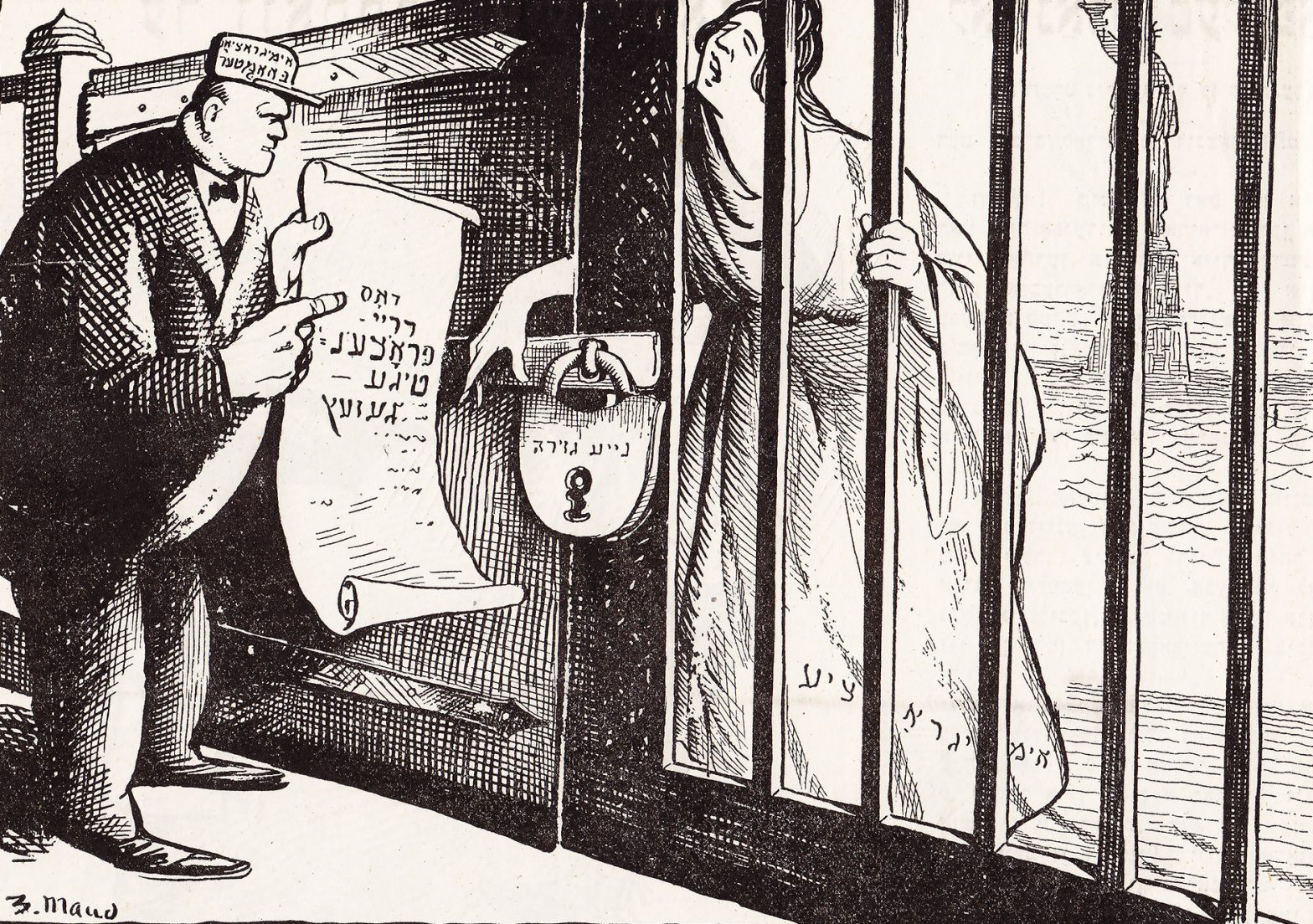
Zuni Maud, the case for open borders, 1921

== Yiddish press and theatre ==
He came to the United States in 1905 with his brother; he became Isaac Maud at Ellis Island. He did odd jobs while studying art at night at Cooper Union and the anarchist social center, the Ferrer School. While working as a messenger boy, he was given the nickname Sunny; he kept the name, but Yiddishized it to Zuni. In 1907 with other young intellectuals he founded the Yiddish magazine Di Yungt and later they started a satirical magazine, Der Kibitzer. His drawings in these journals were one or more panels and were about Jewish life; his first comic story in Yiddish was in 1910. From 1916-1920 he was the entertainment section editor of Forverts, as well as a cartoonist for several other newspapers. In 1924, he joined friends Yosl Cutler and Jack Tworkov to be set and costume designers for Maurice Schwartz's production of Abraham Goldfaden's Di Kishefmacherin. They created puppets for the show and decided to launch a puppet theatre. The trio expanded their early work during a summer spent in the Catskills, at a summer home of left wing painters and writers, who offered opinions. In 1925 the trio opened the Modjacot (a portmanteau word of their names) Spiel Theatre, the first Yiddish puppet theatre in America. Tworkov dropped out very soon, and the amalgam name became Modicot. The "semi-creepy Yiddish speaking puppets" were grotesque and sets tended to the surreal. Plays were delivered with an artful and sharp satire of Yiddish life, with a left-wing political outlook, but maintaining a comic edge. Collaborating with Cutler, their work was always infused with social commentary, surrealism, cubism and cynical humor. The plays articulated "the clash between tradition and modernity marking Yiddish life in New York," and "skewered everything from contemporary politics to Jewish life." In 1929 Modicot toured for three years, first in America, then Europe, with visits to London, Paris, Vilna, Warsaw, Amsterdam and finishing in the Soviet Union. The European tours were well received. In Vilna they played to 75 sold-out performances in one month. In Warsaw the Yiddish press had unmitigated praise for Modicot, recommending it to "all Jewish workers," and noting:

The entire program is full of extraordinary folk humor, wonderful ideas, and splendid technique. We have truly Jewish wrinkles and gestures, words and mumbles, signs and groans, which came about from Jewish sources and a Jewish way of life.

Cutler and Maud had differing but complementary personality profiles:

Cutler is the opposite of Maud. Maud is difficult, Cutler—easy. Maud is stubborn, Cutler—acquiescent. Maud is brutally critical, Cutler—naive and mild. The poet Zishe Vaynper also commented on how different their personalities were, writing that their artistic work together created a kind of harmony which brought them to their artistic goal. He further stated that they were the only artists who brought an element of fun into the proletarian movement.

He illustrated numerous books, primarily for children, and worked as a set designer for Yiddish theatre. He was also active as a calligrapher. He is additionally recognized for his work as a sculptor, book designer, poster artist, and as a writer of parodies and short stories.

=== Retrospective ===
In 2015 the theatre collective Great Small Works performed Muttergang and Other Cheerful Downfalls, a bilingual Yiddish-English revisiting of Maud and Cutler's artistic works, re-working original scripts and using puppets and actors. Their work has recently been considered to be a model for changing power relationships.

== Later life and death ==
Upon returning from the 1933 European tour Maud and Cutler had a "tragic" split up, for unknown reasons. Maud, described as having "a certain melancholy," largely disappeared from the theatre world. After a failed one man art show, he devoted his time to painting for himself at the family bungalow colony in the Catskills. He was pro-communist. During his tours of the Soviet Union, he met and befriended many Jewish writers. In 1956 he was informed that Stalin had executed many of his friends. He died that night of a heart attack. "Since then he has disappeared into the nether world of Yiddish history."
