= Zen Center of Syracuse =

Zen Buddhist center in New York, US

Coordinates: 43°00′07″N 76°08′58″W

Religion
- Affiliation: Rinzai

Location
- Location: 266 West Seneca Turnpike, Syracuse, New York 13207
- Country: United States
- Interactive map of Zen Center of Syracuse

Architecture
- Completed: 1972

Website
- http://www.zencenterofsyracuse.org

The Zen Center of Syracuse (or, Syracuse Zen Center), temple name Hoen-ji, is a Rinzai Zen Buddhist practice center in Syracuse, New York, one of the oldest continuously running Zen centers in the United States. Founded in 1972, the center is currently led by Shinge Roko Sherry Chayat Roshi . Originally at 111 Concord Place, the meditation hall is now located in the former carriage house at 266 West Seneca Turnpike and offers Zen practice for laypeople. Several clergy and practitioners live in a house next door and in the Joshua Forman house, where programs are also conducted. The Zen Center of Syracuse began as a group of graduate students from Syracuse University, with Chayat eventually becoming the center's leader. In addition to Zen practice, the center also provides some instruction in Tibetan Buddhism. According to The Encyclopedia of Women and Religion in North America, "The Syracuse Zen Center also leads meditation at Syracuse University, Syracuse area schools, recovery and justice system institutions, hospitals and corporations." The center also won two awards for their restoration of The Forman House from the Preservation Association of Central New York . This house was instrumental during the War of 1812 and the American Civil War, for it was a bandage assembly area for wounded troops.

== See also ==
- Buddhism in the United States
- Timeline of Zen Buddhism in the United States
