= Tricycle: The Buddhist Review =

American Buddhist quarterly magazine

- Editor & Publisher: James Shaheen
- Former editors: Helen Tworkov
- Frequency: Quarterly
- First issue: 1991; 35 years ago
- Company: Tricycle Foundation
- Country: United States
- Based in: New York City
- Website: tricycle.org

Tricycle: The Buddhist Review is an independent, nonsectarian Buddhist quarterly that publishes Buddhist teachings, practices, and critique. Based in New York City, the magazine has been recognized for its willingness to challenge established ideas within Buddhist communities and beyond.

The magazine is published by the Tricycle Foundation, a not-for-profit educational organization established in 1991 by Helen Tworkov, a former anthropologist and longtime student of Zen and Tibetan Buddhism, and chaired by composer Philip Glass. James Shaheen is the current editor of Tricycle.

Tricycle also hosts a website, film club, monthly video dharma talks with Buddhist teachers, and in-depth online courses. It was one of the first organizations to offer online video teachings, which are now common. The website covers topics ranging from the history of same-sex marriage in the sangha to climate change as a moral issue.

== Name ==
The name Tricycle refers to a three-wheeled vehicle symbolizing the fundamental components of Buddhist philosophy. Buddhism is "often referred to as the 'vehicle to enlightenment,' and the tricycle's three wheels allude to the three treasures: The Buddha, Dharma, and Sangha, or the enlightened teacher, the teachings, and the community. The wheels also relate to the turning of the wheel of dharma, or skillfully using the teachings of the Buddha to face the challenges that the circle of life presents."

== Mission ==
Tworkov stated that the initial vision for the magazine "was simply to disseminate the dharma. That remains the essential mission and the most inspiring aspect of my work." The Tricycle website states that their mission is "to make Buddhist teachings and practices available and to explore their traditional and contemporary expressions."

== History ==
The Tricycle Foundation was registered as a 501(c)(3) nonprofit educational organization in July 1991. That same year, The Tricycle Foundation launched Tricycle: The Buddhist Review, the first Buddhist magazine in the West. Helen Tworkov, the first Editor-in-Chief of Tricycle, founded the magazine along with Rick Fields, a poet and expert on Buddhism's history in the United States, who served as a contributing editor to the magazine.

Tricycle made a concerted effort to feature content about all the Buddhist traditions, not just those most familiar to Americans, such as Tibetan, Theravada, and Zen Buddhism. For example, Tricycle has highlighted Nichiren Buddhism, Pure Land (Shin) Buddhism, and Shingon Buddhism, both in the magazine and on its website.

The Buddhist scholar Stephen Batchelor writes that until Tricycle was published,

Buddhist periodicals in English had been little more than newsletters to promote the interests of particular organizations and their teachers. Tricycle changed all this. Not only was the editorial policy of the magazine strictly non-sectarian, Tricycle was also committed to high literary and aesthetic standards. It became the first Buddhist journal to appear alongside other magazines on newsstands and in bookstores, thus presenting Buddhist ideas and values to a general public rather than committed believers. I very much shared the vision of Tricycle’s founders and began writing regularly for the magazine.

In 1991, Tworkov wrote in a Tricycle editorial that "The spokespeople for Buddhism in America have been, almost exclusively, educated members of the white middle class. ... Asian-American Buddhists number at least one million, but so far they have not figured prominently in the development of something called American Buddhism." In response, Ryo Imamura, who had been influential in bringing Buddhism to America and was close friends with D. T. Suzuki, Gary Snyder, and Alan Watts, wrote a letter to the editor defending Asian-American involvement in American Buddhism, but Tworkov refused to print it. Gary Snyder resigned from the Tricycle advisory board in protest. Tworkov's words have had a lasting impact on racial relations in American Buddhism.

== Readership ==
According to Notre Dame's American Studies Chair Thomas A. Tweed, Tricycle, based on surveys, "estimated that half of the publication's sixty thousand subscribers do not describe themselves as Buddhist." The vast majority of Tricycle’s readership is politically active and considers social engagement to be most appropriate to, even a key component of, Buddhist practice.

== Editorial ==
Articles in Tricycle cover a range of Buddhist traditions, practices, and types of meditation, as well as general topics viewed through a Buddhist lens. This includes family, community, work, arts and culture, politics, social justice, the environment, aging, and death.

Contributors have included the Dalai Lama, Peter Matthiessen, Philip Glass, Thích Nhất Hạnh, Sharon Salzberg, Jon Kabat-Zinn, Joseph Goldstein, Jack Kornfield, Curtis White, Jack Kerouac, Allen Ginsberg, Gary Snyder, Stephen Batchelor, Pema Chödrön, bell hooks, Robert Aitken, Alice Walker, Spalding Gray, Robert Thurman, Bernie Glassman, John Cage, Joanna Macy, Sulak Sivaraksa, Laurie Anderson, Guo Gu, Martin Scorsese, Pico Iyer, and Tom Robbins.

According to Sallie Dinkel from New York Magazine, “Tricycle has functioned as a kind of tugboat of awareness, pushing and pulling traditional Buddhism in a direction that will make sense for the worldly American mainstream… The magazine has published articles on abortion, euthanasia, AIDS, and the Los Angeles riots.”

== Digital presence ==
In addition to its print publication, Tricycle maintains a significant digital presence through its official website, which offers articles, essays, and multimedia content on Buddhist teachings and contemporary issues.

The website features a range of online resources, including video Dharma talks, guided meditations, and interactive courses covering topics such as mindfulness, ethics, and Buddhist philosophy.

Tricycle was among the early Buddhist publications to adopt digital media, offering online video teachings and subscription-based learning programs at a time when such formats were not yet widespread.

The organization also produces digital content such as podcasts, including Tricycle Talks, which features interviews with Buddhist teachers, scholars, and practitioners.

Through its digital platform, Tricycle reaches a global audience and provides access to Buddhist education beyond traditional print readership.

== Change Your Mind Day ==
In 1993, Tricycle created “Change Your Mind Day," an afternoon of free meditation instruction held in New York City's Central Park. The event was designed to introduce “the general public to Buddhist thought and practice." During the first Change Your Mind Day, newcomers and seasoned Buddhists meditated, listened to performances by Philip Glass and Allen Ginsberg, and did tai-ch’i.

Tworkov described the event: "We invite teachers from different traditions to give instruction on meditation. The miracle, if you get into it, is you can have a couple of thousand people in New York City and it can get very, very quiet. It takes on a kind of tranquillity and collective consciousness, and everybody notices it." Rande Brown, a former member of Tricycle's board, estimated that 300 people attended the first event, and that 10 times that number attended in 1998. She said, "Enough people wander by and are serendipitously drawn into the silence." The event has grown in popularity, as has mindfulness meditation. Starting in 2007, Tricycle began also hosting a virtual Change Your Mind Day to provide international and remote access to the event. The last Change Your Mind Day was held virtually in 2010, although many other organizations continue to host versions of the event.

== Books ==
The Tricycle Foundation has published several books, including Big Sky Mind: Buddhism and the Beat Generation, Breath Sweeps Mind: A First Guide to Meditation Practice, Buddha Laughing: A Tricycle Book of Cartoons, Commit to Sit: Tools for Cultivating a Meditation Practice from the Pages of Tricycle, and Stephen Batchelor's Buddhism Without Beliefs, a founding text of Secular Buddhism. Tricycle has also published numerous e-books on topics ranging from happiness to addiction.

== Awards ==
Tricycle has twice garnered the Utne Media Award, most recently in 2013. The 2013 Award was for "Best Body/Spirit Coverage." Tricycle has also been awarded the Folio Award for "Best Spiritual Magazine" three times.

== See also ==
- Buddhism in the United States
