= Yosl Cutler =

Yiddish-American cartoonist, poet, satirist and puppeteer

Cutler c. 1930

Yosl Cutler (Yiddish: יאסל קאטלער, 1896 – June 11, 1935) was a Yiddish-American cartoonist, poet, satirist and founder of the first Yiddish puppet theatre in the United States.

== Biography ==
Yosl Cutler, an orphaned son of a butcher, was born in Troyanov (today Troyaniv, Zhytomyr Raion), Russian Empire, and came to the United States in 1911 with an older brother. Cutler first worked as a house and sign painter.

== Career ==
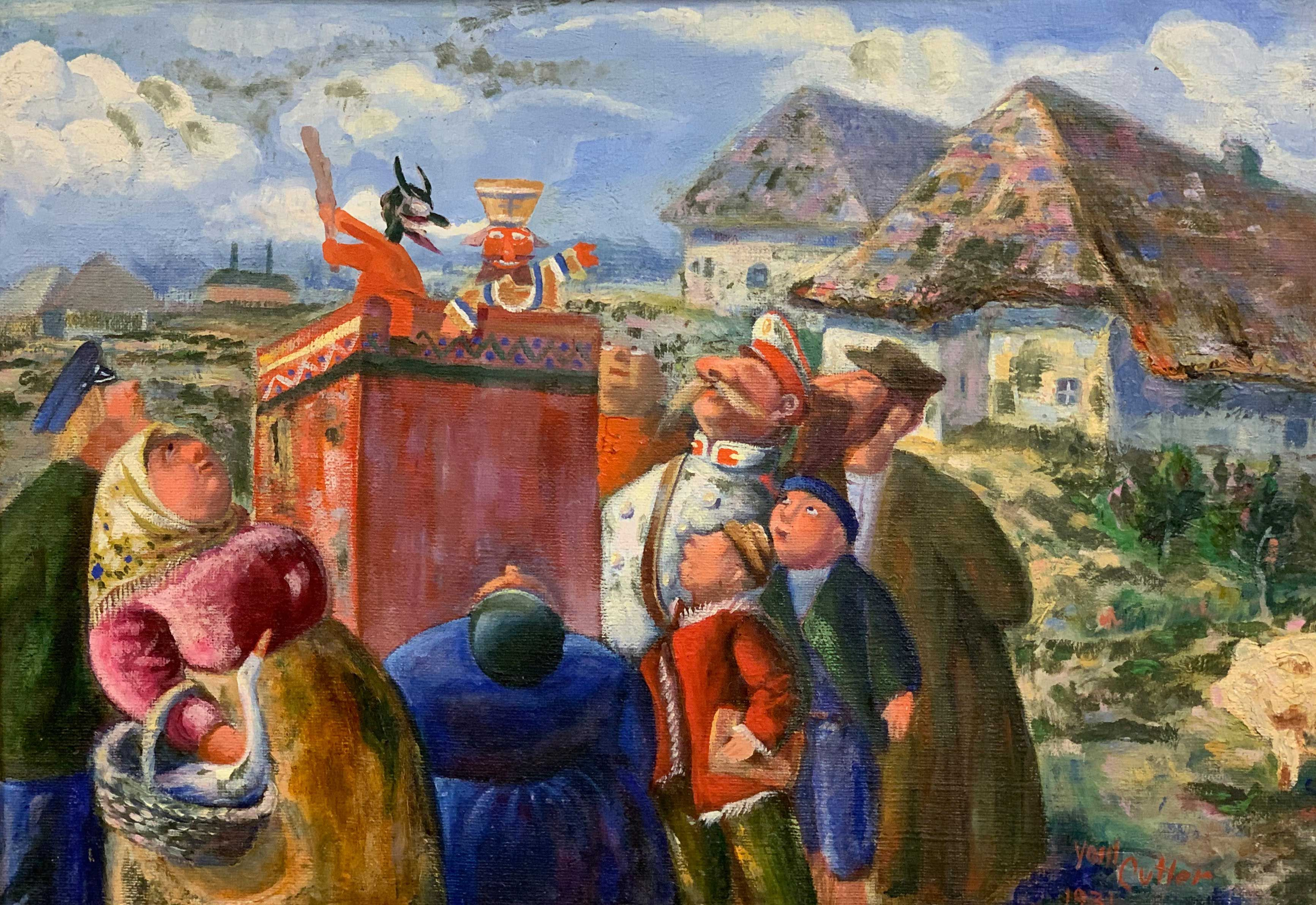
A rare surviving painting by Yosl Cutler. The painting is captioned "I remember this in our shtetl in the marketplace" referring to the traveling puppet theatre.

A chance encounter with Moyshe Nadir turned Cutler into a writer, Nadir bringing Cutler into the Yiddish literary world. In 1922 Cutler began writing absurdist and spoofing vignettes which he illustrated himself and worked as a cartoonist for the Yiddish press. In 1923, along with friends Zuni Maud and Jack Tworkov, he was hired as a stage and costume designer for the Yiddish Art Theatre of Maurice Schwartz, where he developed experience with puppeteering. Cutler was first exposed to puppets in Ukraine, where he grew up; the shows were frequently anti-Semitic, "but he loved the puppets." The trio expanded their early work during a summer spent in the Catskills, at a summer home of left wing painters and writers, who offered opinions. In 1925, the trio opened the Modjacot (a portmanteau of their names) Spiel Theatre, a Yiddish puppet theatre performed in New York City, but "born in the Catskills". When Tworkov left in 1926, unhappy with the socialist spin of the plays, the amalgam name was shortened to Modicot. Modicot was the first Yiddish language puppet theatre in America. The "semi-creepy Yiddish speaking puppets" were grotesque and sets tended to the surreal. Plays were delivered with an artful and sharp satire of Yiddish life, with a left-wing political outlook, but maintaining a comic edge. Collaborating with Maud, their work was always infused with social commentary, surrealism, cubism and cynical humor. The plays articulated "the clash between tradition and modernity marking Yiddish life in New York," and "skewered everything from contemporary politics to Jewish life." A noteworthy aspect of their work was to re-appropriate puppetry. The history of Slavic anti-Semitic puppet shows combined with the Jewish injunction against creating graven images made puppetry "a thoroughly un-Jewish art form." Their work has been noted to be unlike anything previously experienced in the Yiddish theatre. The works at the theatre were diverse, and included Nadir and Avrom Reyzen plays, and Maud and Cutler adaptations of Purim plays and original satires and parodies dealing with old world Yiddish foibles and hypocrisies; plays frequently included sexual liberation and, by the 1930s, pro-communist themes. The struggles of the working class were portrayed, with Franklin Roosevelt and William Randolph Hearst turned into comic rabbits. Maud and Cutler were popular with general audiences, intellectuals, and "won critical acclaim from all precincts of the Yiddish press." Given their left-wing associations, this was an unprecedented agreement in the usually contentious Yiddish press. In 1929 Modicot toured for three years, first in America, then Europe, with visits to London, Paris, Vilna, Warsaw, Amsterdam and finishing in the Soviet Union. The European tours were well received. In Vilna they played to 75 sold-out performances in one month. In Warsaw the Yiddish press had unmitigated praise for Modicot, recommending it to "all Jewish workers," and noting:

The entire program is full of extraordinary folk humor, wonderful ideas, and splendid technique. We have truly Jewish wrinkles and gestures, words and mumbles, signs and groans, which came about from Jewish sources and a Jewish way of life.

Upon returning to the U.S. Cutler and Maud split. Cutler continued working in multiple mediums for Jewish publications and outlets. He participated in puppetry, writing and performing, at the Worker's Laboratory; and, writing a daily column for the communist Yiddish daily, Morgen Freiheit, as well as being the newspaper's cartoonist. Emanuel Levy considers Cutler to have been a "Jack of all trades", a puppeteer, craftsman, cartoonist, set designer and poet.

Cutler was a master of the stylized grotesque. He was also an extraordinarily accomplished draftsman, able to stretch, shrink and contort a line into an endless kaleidoscope of forms.

Cutler's early writing showed a thorough contempt for the rich, exploiters and philistines. As he matured, his writing began to impart revolutionary meaning to his satire.

He turned communist, and began writing in prose and verse amazingly clever political satire retaining the sunny cheer and infectious impishness of his early writings.

== Later work ==
Cutler spent the last years of his life working on a grand project, which he called Crisis Dybbuk. He wished to create a marionette show to fill an evening. He chose the Dybbuk to do a parody of virtues and to reveal their true worth. It was also a political satire, showing that the "snake oil" used to treat the economic crisis of the 1930s was meant to mislead the people. He died in 1935 in an automobile accident in Iowa Falls before being able to perform the show. Approximately 10,000 people attended the funeral; he was buried in the cemetery of the International Workers Order. In 2015 the theatre collective Great Small Works performed Muttergang and Other Cheerful Downfalls, a bilingual Yiddish-English revisiting of Maud and Cutler's artistic works, re-working original scripts and using puppets and actors. Cutler's work has recently been considered to be a model for changing power relationships.
