= New York Zendo Shobo-Ji =

Religious establishment in New York City

Coordinates: 40°45′58″N 73°57′41″W

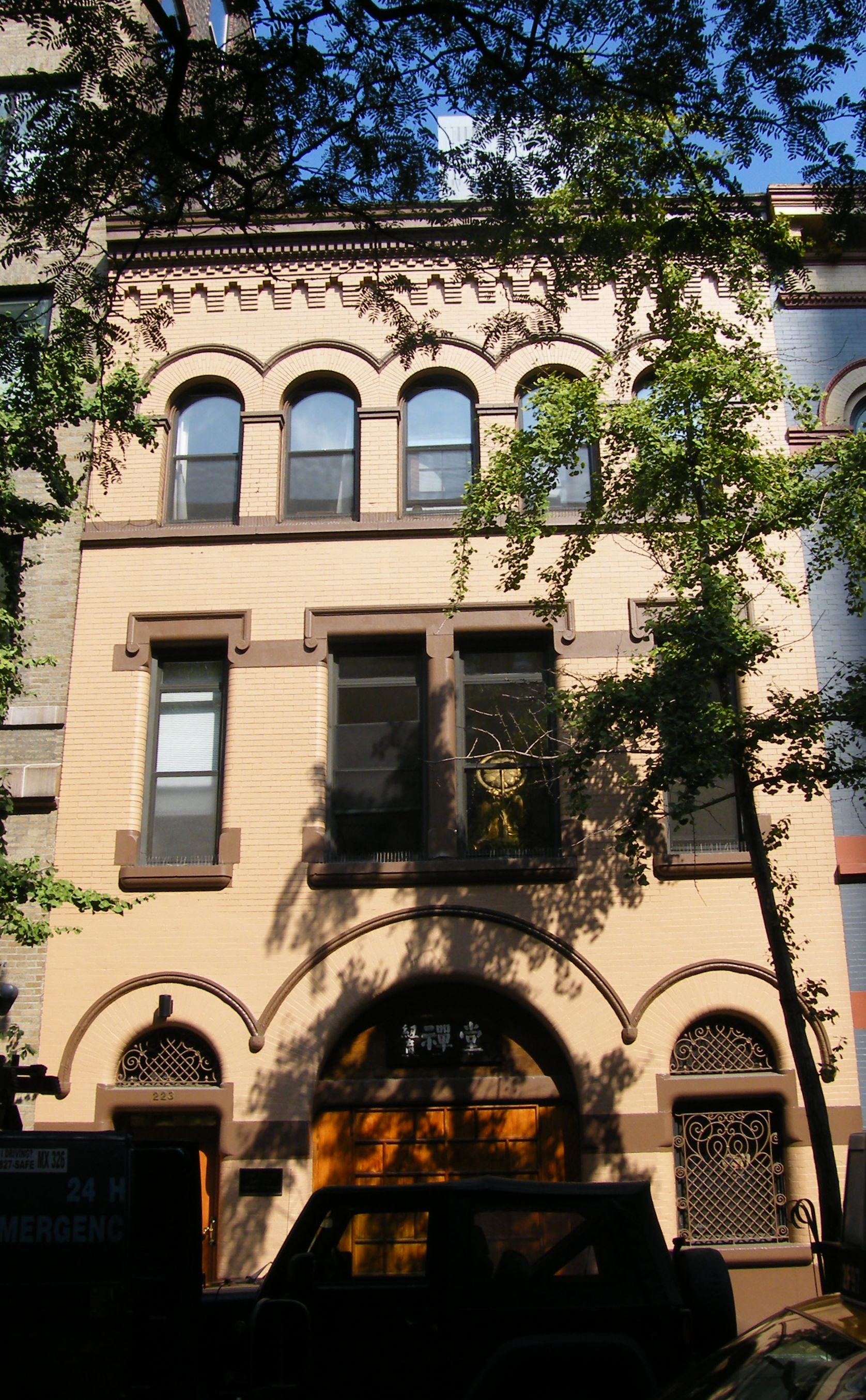

Religion
- Affiliation: Rinzai

Location
- Location: 223 East 67th Street, New York, NY 10065
- Country: United States
- Interactive map of New York Zendo Shobo-Ji

Architecture
- Founder: Soen Nakagawa Roshi & Eido Tai Shimano Roshi

Website
- http://zenstudies.org/new-york-zendo/

New York Zendo Shobo-Ji, or Temple of True Dharma, is a Rinzai zen practice facility. It is located on the Upper East Side of Manhattan, New York, in the United States. It is operated by the Zen Studies Society. Founded on September 15, 1968, by Zen master Soen Nakagawa Roshi and Eido Tai Shimano Roshi, the building was converted from a garage, formerly a carriage house. Eido Tai Shimano Roshi, now deceased, was the founding abbot. He was succeeded on January 1, 2011, by Roko Sherry Chayat Roshi, who retired in 2023 and was replaced as Abbot by Chigan-kutsu Kyo-On Dokuro Jaeckel Roshi. The temple is affiliated with Dai Bosatsu Zendo in upstate New York.

New York Zendo offers daily zazen and chanting services; monthly all-day sits and weekend sesshin providing teisho, dokusan, Dharma talks and practice interviews; and other related events.

== See also ==
- Timeline of Zen Buddhism in the United States
