= Kyudo Nakagawa =

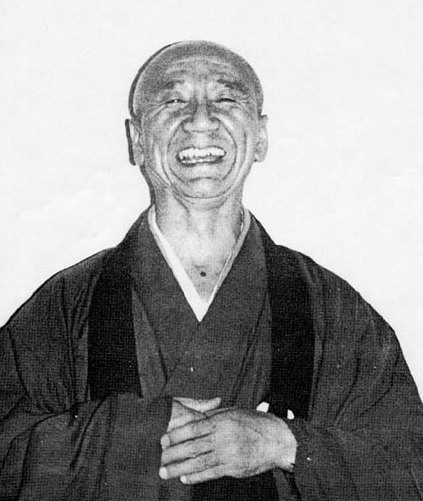
- Title: Rōshi

Personal life
- Born: Myosho Nakagawa; 12 February 1927 Ichijima-cho, Hyōgo Prefecture, Japan
- Died: 29 December 2007 (aged 80) Japan
- Education: Komazawa University
- Other name: Kyudo (Dharma name)

Religious life
- Religion: Zen
- School: Rinzai school

Senior posting
- Based in: Soho Zen Buddhist Association
- Predecessor: Soen Nakagawa

Kyudo Nakagawa (中川 球童, 12 February 1927—29 December 2007), or Nakagawa Kyūdō, was a Japanese-born Rinzai rōshi who for many years led Soho Zen Buddhist Society, Inc. in Manhattan's Lower East Side.

== Biography ==
A Dharma heir of the late Soen Nakagawa—who is of no familial relation—Kyudo first became a Zen monk at age eight. He undertook Buddhist studies at Japan's renowned Komazawa University and entered Gukei-ji. Then, at age thirty, Kyudo entered Ryūtaku-ji temple and trained under Soen Nakagawa. In 1968 he moved to Jerusalem to lead a center Soen had opened in Israel called Kibutsu-ji, where he stayed on for thirteen years. Kyudo then returned to Ryūtaku-ji briefly and moved to New York City, where he led the Soho Zen Buddhist Society, Inc. He also made occasional trips to England now and then to lead the London Zen Society.

After Soen Roshi's death in 1984, Sochu Suzuki Roshi became abbot of Ryūtaku-ji. When Sochu Roshi died in 1990, Kyudo became abbot of Ryūtaku-ji. He died on 29 December 2007, at the age of eighty. The Soho Zen Buddhist Society, Inc. in Manhattan closed its practice center, the Soho Zendo at 464 West Broadway, following Kyudo's death. Among others, he trained Lawrence Shainberg, author of Ambivalent Zen, which discusses Kyudo's teachings and provides an intimate portrait of this Zen master.

== See also ==
- Buddhism in Japan
- List of Rinzai Buddhists
- Timeline of Zen Buddhism in the United States
