= Dai Bosatsu Zendo Kongo-ji =

Rinzai Buddhist monastery in Livingston Manor, New York

Coordinates: 42.028014°N 74.644018°W

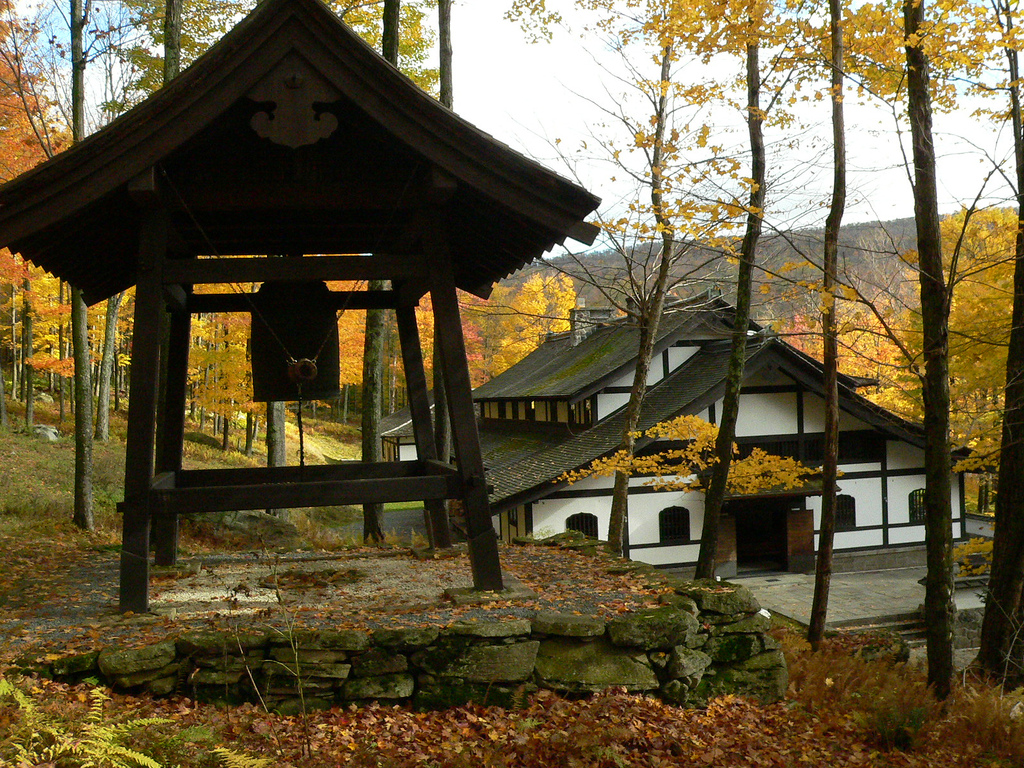

Religion
- Affiliation: Rinzai

Location
- Location: 223 Beecher Lake Road, Livingston Manor, New York 12758-6000
- Country: United States
- Interactive map of Dai Bosatsu Zendo Kongo-ji

Architecture
- Founder: Soen Nakagawa Roshi & Eido Tai Shimano Roshi
- Completed: July 4, 1976

Website
- http://www.daibosatsu.org

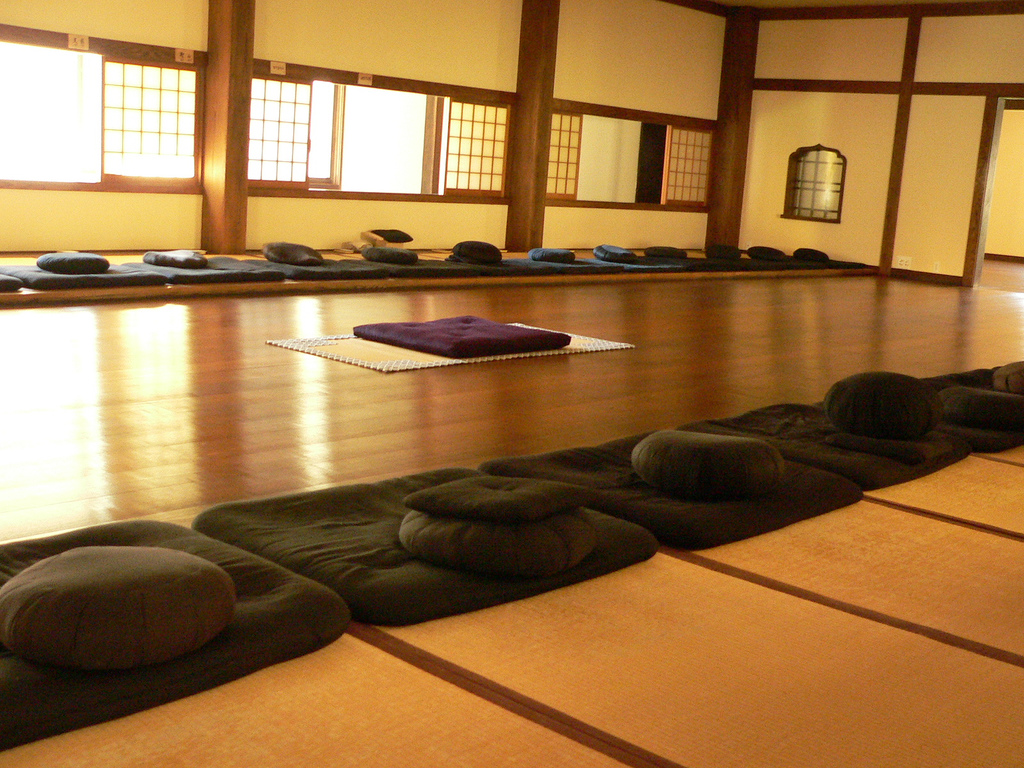
Dai Bosatsu Zendo Kongo-ji zendo

Dai Bosatsu Zendo Kongo-ji, or International Dai Bosatsu Zendo Kongo-ji, is a Rinzai Zen monastery and retreat center located in the Catskill Mountains of upstate New York. Dai Bosatsu Zendo Kongo-ji is part of the Zen Studies Society, founded in 1956 to support the work of D.T. Suzuki. It is affiliated with New York Zendo on the Upper East Side of Manhattan. Zen Studies Society was led by Shinge-Shitsu Roko Sherry Chayat Roshi until her retirement in 2023. The Zen Studies Society community celebrated the installation of Abbot Chigan-kutsu Kyo-On Dukuro Jaeckel Roshi on November 24, 2023.

== Activities ==
The site offers daily services which include zazen, chanting and samu (work). Dai Bosatsu Zendo Kongo-ji also offers traditional kessei — a three-month period of intensive spiritual training in a Zen monastery — in addition to weeklong sesshin and weekend retreats throughout the year. Those students who wish to ordain with Chigan Roshi are expected to live at the monastery after ordination for 1,000 days, after which they have the option of staying or going back out into the secular world.

== Location ==
Located about a 3-hour drive north of New York City on 1,400 acres (5.7 km^{2}) near Beecher Lake in a deciduous forest region, Dai Bosatsu Zendo Kongo-ji was established on July 4, 1976. The monastery site is located atop a 2-mile (3.2 km) drive that passes by "Sangha Meadow", a cemetery for housing the remains of deceased sangha members (including a portion of the ashes of Soen Nakagawa Roshi). The facility's upstate mailing address is in the nearby township of Livingston Manor off New York State Route 17 (NY 17). It is affiliated with New York Zendo on the Upper East Side of Manhattan.

== Controversy ==
In July 2010, Eido Shimano, co-founder of Dai Bosatsu Zendo Kongo-ji and an abbot for over three decades, resigned from the Zen Studies Society Board of Directors after a relationship between Shimano and one of his female students became a subject of controversy, amid accusations that this was only the latest in a series of affairs spanning several decades. A committee of Zen teachers formed in November 2011 found that the sexual acts were often initiated during formal private sanzen interactions between Zen teacher and student. The board was aware of the situation for decades, but was unsure how to respond."

In December, 2012, Myoshinji, the headquarters of Shimano's claimed lineage sect, issued a public statement responding to the controversies surrounding Shimano and the Zen Studies Society; they state they have

... no connection with Eidō Shimano, his activities or organizations, including Dai Bosatsu Zendo and all affiliated Zen Studies Society institutions, nor is Eidō Shimano or any of his successors certified as priests of the Myōshin-ji branch of Zen or recognized as qualified teachers."

== See also ==
- Sesshin
- Tenzo
- Chester Carlson (Daitokuin Zenshin Carlson Koji)
- Zen in the United States
- Timeline of Zen Buddhism in the United States
