= Lawrence Shainberg =

American author

- Born: Memphis, Tennessee, United States
- Education: Columbia University
- Occupations: Author, writer
- Writing career
- Language: English
- Genre: Fiction

Lawrence Shainberg is an American author born in Memphis, Tennessee. His books include Ambivalent Zen, a memoir of spiritual ambition and his experience with Kyudo Nakagawa, One on One, Brain Surgeon: An Intimate View of the World, Memories of Amnesia, and Crust. His latest memoir Four Men Shaking details his "transformative relationships" with Norman Mailer, Samuel Beckett, and his Zen master Kyudo Nakagawa Roshi.

Shainberg has had numerous essays published in The New York Times, Harper's Magazine, and The Village Voice. Exorcising Beckett, a memoir of his conversations with Samuel Beckett first published in The Paris Review in 1987, won the Pushcart Prize.

In 1968, he signed the Writers and Editors War Tax Protest pledge, vowing to refuse tax payments in protest against the Vietnam War.

He lives in New York City. He is a graduate of Columbia University.
