= Cambridge Buddhist Association =

Organisation in Massachusetts, US

Religion
- Affiliation: non-sectarian
- Status: Closed as of September 2011 (as place of practice)

Location
- Location: Cambridge, Massachusetts
- Country: United States

Architecture
- Founder: D.T. Suzuki, Hisamatsu Shinichi, John & Elsie Mitchell
- Completed: 1957

The Cambridge Buddhist Association was informally founded in 1957 when D.T. Suzuki moved to Cambridge, Massachusetts and befriended John and Elsie Mitchell, who ran a vast library of books on Buddhism and held zazen for various practitioners. The institution was incorporated in 1959 and remains active. In 1979 Maurine Stuart, a Rinzai rōshi, became President of the organization, and several influential Buddhist teachers in the United States have been members.

The Cambridge Buddhist Association ceased to offer a place of practice in September 2011, when the property that housed the Zendō was sold.

== Spiritual directors ==
- Dokuro R. Jaeckel (2004 - 2011)
- Maurine Stuart (deceased)

== See also ==
- Buddhism in the United States
- Timeline of Zen Buddhism in the United States
