= Zen Studies Society =

American Zen Buddhist organization

Coordinates: 40°45′58″N 73°57′41″W

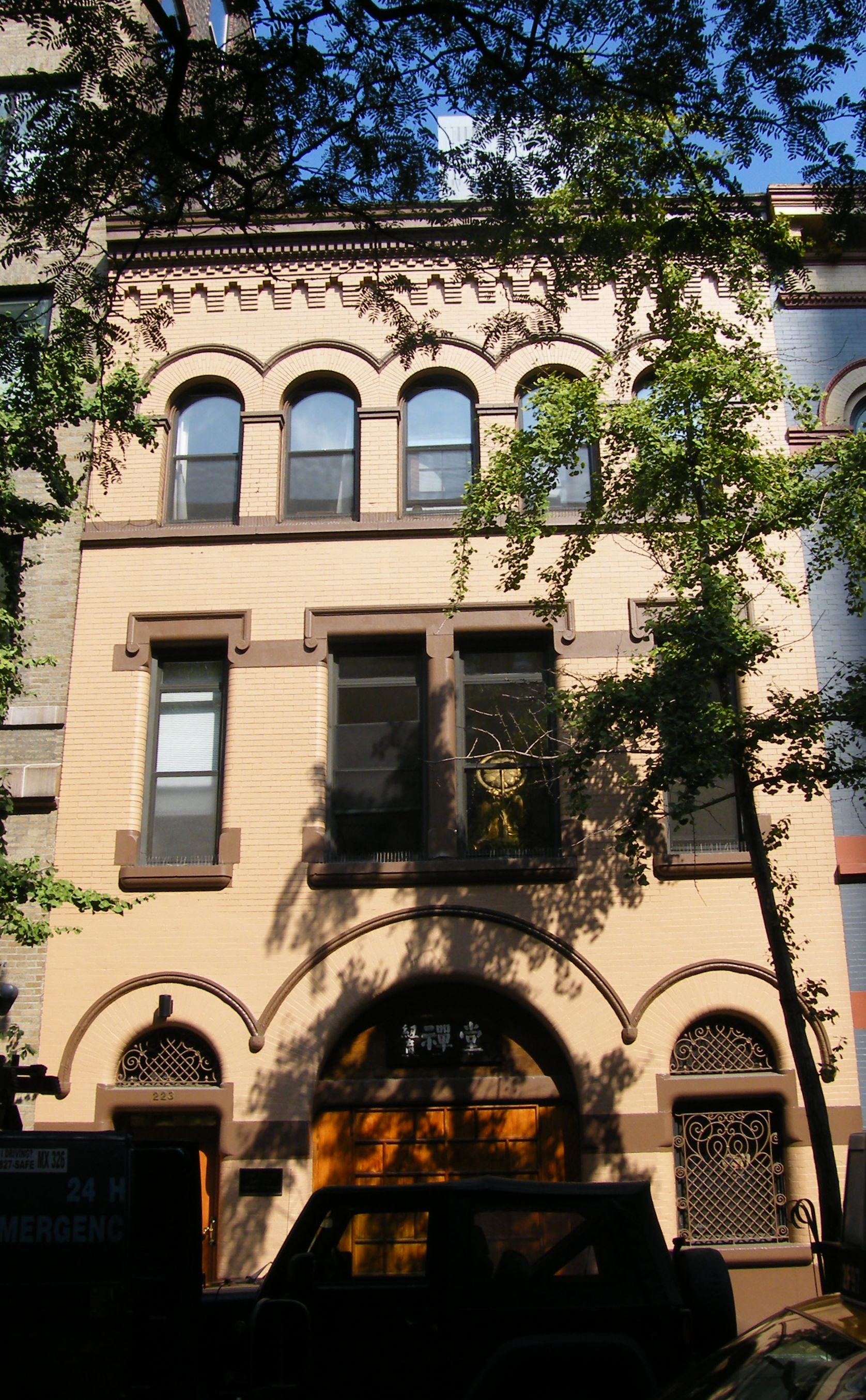

Religion
- Affiliation: Rinzai

Location
- Location: 223 East 67th Street, New York, NY 10065 and 223 Beecher Lake Road, Livingston Manor, NY 12758
- Country: United States
- Interactive map of Zen Studies Society

Architecture
- Founder: Cornelius Crane

Website
- zenstudies.org

The Zen Studies Society was established in 1956 by Cornelius Crane to help assist the scholar Daisetz Teitaro Suzuki in his work and to help promulgate Zen Buddhism in Western countries. It operates both New York Zendo Shobo-Ji in New York City and Dai Bosatsu Zendo Kongo-Ji in the Catskills area of New York State. Influenced by the teachings of Soen Nakagawa Roshi and Nyogen Senzaki, ZSS is one of the oldest organizations dedicated to the practice of Rinzai Zen in the United States.

The institution came under the leadership of Eido Tai Shimano in 1965. Allegations of sexual and financial improprieties surfaced regarding Shimano, causing controversy in the community. In July 2010 Shimano and his wife resigned from the board of directors following the revelation of his relationship with a female student, amid accusations that this was only the latest in series of such affairs. Shimano also resigned as abbot, and announced he would retire from teaching in any formal capacity. Shinge-shitsu Roko Sherry Chayat Roshi, one of Shimano's Dharma heirs, was installed as abbot in January 2011. She retired in 2023 and was succeeded by Chigan-kutsu Kyo-On Dokuro Jaeckel Roshi.

== See also ==
- Buddhism in the United States
- Timeline of Zen Buddhism in the United States
