= Eido Tai Shimano =

Japanese Rinzai Zen Buddhist priest

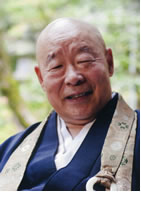

Personal life
- Born: 1 October 1932 Tokyo, Japan
- Died: 18 February 2018 (aged 85) Japan

Religious life
- Religion: Buddhism
- School: Rinzai

Senior posting
- Based in: Zen Studies Society; New York Zendo Shobo-Ji; Dai Bosatsu Zendo Kongo-Ji

Eido Tai Shimano (嶋野 栄道, Shimano Eidō; 1 October 1932 – 18 February 2018) was a Rinzai Zen Buddhist priest. He was the founding abbot of the New York Zendo Shobo-Ji in Manhattan and Dai Bosatsu Zendo Kongo-Ji monastery in the Catskill mountains of New York; he was forced to resign from that position of 40 years after revelations of a series of sexual relationships with and alleged sexual harassment of female students.

== Biography ==
=== Early years ===
Shimano was born in Tokyo, Japan, in 1932, and was given the name Eitaro. His first encounter with a Buddhist scripture came at the age of nine, when his school teacher instructed his class to memorize the Heart Sutra. During the war the Shimano family moved to Chichibu, the mountain city where his mother was born. In his youth Shimano was ordained as a novice monk by Kengan Goto, the priest of Empuku-ji, the Rinzai temple in Chichibu. Kengan Goto gave him the Dharma name Eido, composed from first characters of two Japanese Zen founders, Eisai and Dogen. Later he was trained by Shirozou Keizan Roshi, abbot of Heirin-ji, near Tokyo. This was a Rinzai training monastery with strict discipline.

In 1954, Shimano left to study at Ryutaku-ji and practice with Soen Nakagawa Roshi, a relatively young Zen teacher. The following year Nyogen Senzaki visited the temple from America and left a lasting impression on Shimano.

=== United States ===
In 1957, Soen Roshi asked Shimano to go to America for one year to attend the elderly Nyogen Senzaki. He agreed, but Nyogen died in 1958 before Shimano had a chance to go.

Soen asked Shimano to go to Hawaii instead to help to guide the Diamond Sangha, founded by Robert Baker Aitken and his wife, Anne Hopkins Aitken. At first reluctant, Soen persuaded Shimano that going to Hawaii would be good for both his recuperation from an illness and his academic studies (suggesting he study at the University of Hawaii).

In August 1960 Shimano left for Hawaii by ship. His friend Bernard Phillips, an American Zen scholar, was returning home on the same ship, after doing research in Japan sponsored by the Zen Studies Society. Without any prior arrangements, they ended up in the same cabin.

Shimano later returned to Japan and met Haku'un Yasutani, accompanying him and Soen back to the United States. In 1964, a rift developed with Aitken: according author and journalist Mark Oppenheimer he left Hawaii because his possible involvement with the mental breakdowns of two female students. He moved to New York City. According to Shimano, after arriving on New Year's Eve, he walked Manhattan in his Buddhist robe. "Every single day I picked up two or three people who were curious," he reported. "And that was the beginning of the sangha". In 1965, he became a member of the Zen Studies Society which gathered at the New York Zendo Shobo-Ji in Manhattan. It had been founded in the 1950s, but had not recently been very active. A few years later he became abbot of the Zen Studies Society. His followers included well-heeled individuals such as Dorris Carlson, who gave funds to create a monastery in the Catskills, Dai Bosatsu Zendo, which opened in 1976.

Shimano received Dharma transmission from Soen Nakagawa in 1972 in a public ceremony at the New York Zendo Shobo-ji witnessed by his Sangha. In 2004, Eido Shimano Roshi received the Buddhism Transmission Award from the Japan-based Bukkyo Dendo Kyokai Foundation for his impact on the dissemination of Buddhism in the West. This same organization produced a documentary on Eido Shimano Roshi and Dai Bosatsu Zendo Kongo-Ji.

== Sexual misconduct ==
Over the years, there were rumors that the married Shimano was having sex with some of his female students. Robert Aitken, Shimano's former patron, interviewed some of these women over a period of 40 years and kept records of the liaisons. He attempted to raise concerns including by writing the sexual misconduct and abuse to Zen Studies Society board in 1995. In 2008, the University of Hawaii at Manoa unsealed his papers, and in 2010 the ZSS board started to work on an ethics guideline which included an acknowledgement of past wrongdoing by Shimano. Board members believed that there were no recent incidents and that the misconduct had ceased 15 years ago. However, in June 2010, at a community dinner at the monastery in the Catskills, a female student stood up and stated that for two years she had been having a consensual affair with Shimano.

In July 2010, Eido and his wife resigned from the ZSS Board of Directors. Shimano sent a letter of apology to the ZSS community in September, 2010, stating "“Over time, I took your kindness for granted and arrogance grew in my heart. As a result, my sensitivity to feel the pain of others decreased. Now, as I reflect on the past, I realize how many people’s feelings and trust in me were hurt by my words and deeds.”. In addition, he stated that he would retire as abbot of the Zen Studies Society in December. He did so on December 8, 2010. Shinge Roko Sherry Chayat Roshi, who received dharma transmission in 1998, was installed as the new Abbot on January 1, 2011.

In February, 2011, the Zen Studies Society announced that Eido Shimano no longer would teach Zen under the auspices of their organization. On July 2, 2011, an open meeting for all sangha members of the ZSS was held, where Shimano encouraged everyone to accept his successor, Shinge Sherry Chayat, as their teacher, and stated unequivocally that in order to avoid further controversy and division, he would no longer formally teach Zen in any capacity.

Some of the richer students left the Zen Studies Society, causing financial difficulties for the society. Shimano remained in the apartment owned and maintained by the ZSS. He sued the organization for a pension, a pension denied by the Society's leaders who stated that he was not entitled to one given his years of inappropriate behavior.

In December, 2012, Myoshinji, the headquarters of Shimano's claimed lineage sect, issued a public statement responding to the controversies surrounding Shimano and ZSS; they state they have

...no connection with Eidō Shimano, his activities or organizations, including Dai Bosatsu Zendo and all affiliated Zen Studies Society institutions, nor is Eidō Shimano or any of his successors certified as priests of the Myōshin-ji branch of Zen or recognized as qualified teachers."

Eido Shimano died on February 18, 2018, in Gifu, Japan, at the age of 85.

== Dharma heirs ==
- Junpo Denis Kelly
- Andy Afable
- Sherry Chayat
- John Mortensen (now Egmund T. Sommer)
- Genjo Marinello

Eido Shimano and his successors, are not acknowledged by Myoshinji.

== Bibliography ==
- Shimano, Eido; Vacher, Charles (1997). Shōbōgenzō: being-time. Encre marine. ISBN 2-909422-24-0.
- Shimano, Eido; Vacher, Charles (1999). Shōbōgenzō: only buddha knows buddha, life-death. Encre marine. ISBN 2-909422-37-2.
- Shimano, Eido (1996). "Japanese Views of Religion as Opposed to Those of the West". Journal of Japanese Trade & Industry. 15 (6). Japan Economic Foundation. ISSN 0285-9556. OCLC 90863113.
- Shimano, Eido (2005). The Book of Rinzai: The Recorded Sayings of Zen Master Rinzai (Linji). Zen Studies Society Press. ISBN 0-9769894-0-9. OCLC 244629468.
- Shimano, Eido; Kōgetsu Tani (1992). Zen Word, Zen Calligraphy. Shambhala Publications. ISBN 0-87773-643-X. OCLC 23180280.
- Shimano, Eido (1991). Points of Departure: Zen Buddhism with a Rinzai View. Zen Studies Society Press. OCLC 26097869.
- Shimano, Eido; Levine, Janis (1979). Golden Wind: Zen Talks. Harper & Row. ISBN 0-87040-449-0. OCLC 5787871.
- Shimano, Eido ed. (1978). Like a Dream, Like a Fantasy: The Zen Teachings and Translations of Nyogen Senzaki.. Japan Publications. ISBN 0-87040-434-2

== See also ==
- Zen in the USA
- Buddhism in the United States
- List of Rinzai Buddhists
- Timeline of Zen Buddhism in the United States

== Sources ==
- Aitken, Robert (1997). Original Dwelling Place. Counterpoint. ISBN 1-887178-41-4.
- Ford, James Ishmael (2006). Zen Master WFho?: A Guide to the People and Stories of Zen. Wisdom Publications. ISBN 0-86171-509-8.
- Prebish, Charles S. (1999). Luminous Passage: The Practice and Study of Buddhism in America. University of California Press. ISBN 0-520-21697-0.
- Senzaki, Nyogen; Nakagawa, Soen; Shimano, Eido (1976). Nordstrom, Louis (ed.). Namu Dai Bosa: a transmission of Zen Buddhism to America. Bhaisajaguru. New York: Theatre Arts Books. ASIN B001R6G1X6. LCCN 76011286.
- Smith, Huston; Oldmeadow, Harry (2004). Journeys east: 20th century Western encounters with Eastern religious traditions. Bloomington, Ind: World Wisdom. ISBN 0-941532-57-7.
- Tworkov, Helen (1989). Zen in America. North Point Press. ISBN 0-86547-354-4.
