= Soen Nakagawa =

Japanese Zen Buddhist master

Sōen Nakagawa
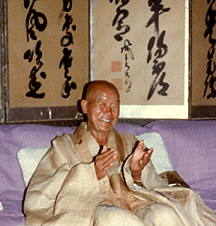
- Title: Rōshi

Personal life
- Born: Motoi Nakagawa; March 19, 1907 Keelung, Taiwan
- Died: March 11, 1984 (aged 76) Mishima, Shizuoka, Japan

Religious life
- Religion: Zen Buddhism
- Temple: Ryutaku-ji
- School: Rinzai

Sōen Nakagawa (中川 宋淵, Nakagawa Sōen; born Motoi Nakagawa; March 19, 1907 – March 11, 1984) was a Japanese rōshi and Zen Buddhist master in the Rinzai tradition. An enigmatic figure, Nakagawa had a major impact on Zen as it was practiced in the 20th century, both in Japan and abroad.

== Early life ==
Soen Nakagawa was born as Motoi Nakagawa on March 19, 1907, in Keelung, Taiwan as the eldest of three boys: Matoi, Tamotsu and Sonow. His father, Suketaro Nakagawa, was an army medical officer and his mother's name was Kazuko. His family moved shortly after to Iwakuni, and then finally to Hiroshima. In 1917, at age 12, Nakagawa's father died, leaving his mother Kazuko a young widow. Soen's younger brother, Tamotsu, died soon after in his early childhood. His mother was forced to work to make ends meet and educate her young children herself. It was an unforgiving childhood for Soen. But Soen was much more interested in the arts, where at a young age he displayed a gift for poetry.

== Education ==
In 1923, Soen (still Matoi) entered high school and became a boarder at the First Academy in Tokyo. Soen's childhood friend, Yamada Koun, enrolled on the same day as him. The two became roommates there and remained lifelong friends. Rather than carry on the samurai tradition of his father, Soen pondered a more spiritual occupation. Koun recalled one occasion when Soen talked about how he was sitting zazen atop a platform on the balancing bars in the playground resulting in a "natural self-realisation". Koun found this rather odd. Soen would write later, as a monk, that his high school years were spent in search of a meaning in life. At the school library, Soen read a passage on impermanence and deluded approaches towards happiness by Schopenhauer, which provided him with a sense of clarity. Soen also found great clarity in the passages of Orategama by Hakuin. He gave a copy to Yamada Koun, beginning his own interest in Zen afterwards.

In 1927, Soen and Yamada entered Tokyo Imperial University together, where Soen stayed in a dorm at the Pure Land temple Gangyo-ji. He majored in Japanese Literature, and it was here that he continued writing his poetry. While at the university Soen studied classics of both the East and West. He studied Buddhist Sutras along with the Bible. He enjoyed campus life, where he frequented the theater to hear renditions of classical masters and had a band of friends immersed within the artistic community of Japan. Soen even started a small group at the university for people to sit zazen together, a tradition that lives on at the university to this day. Soen's final thesis was on the famous haiku poet, Matsuo Bashō.

== Zen training ==
In 1931 Nakagawa and Yamada graduated from Tokyo Imperial University, and it would be several years before the two would meet again. A short while after graduation Soen attended a Dharma talk by Rinzai Zen master Keigaku Katsube at Shorin-ji and knew he wanted to become a monk. Soen wanted to be ordained on his birthday at Kogaku-ji, once the monastery of his favorite Zen master Bassui. His mother felt he was throwing away his education, but knew he was a grown man who had to make his own decisions. So on March 19, 1931, Soen was ordained as a Zen monk by Keigaku Katsube at Kogaku-ji and given his Dharma name Soen. Just like Bassui, Soen began travelling to Dai Bosatsu Mountain in Kai province (near Mount Fuji) doing solitary retreats as a hermit and then returning to the monastery to resume his duties as a monk. On the mountain Soen sat zazen and wrote haikus, bathing in nearby streams and living off of the land. One day while on the mountain he nearly killed himself by eating poisonous mushrooms, and some peasants from nearby took him in and nursed him back to health. During this time Soen also became a friend and informal pupil of Dakotsu Iida, the now famous haiku poet. He later sent his work to Iada and had it published in Iida's haiku journal, Unmo. In 1932 Nakagawa first conceived the idea of an International Dai Bosatsu Zendo while meditating on Dai Bosatsu Mountain, traveling to Sakhalin Island in Siberia in an empty search for gold to fund the project. It was also on Dau Bosatsu Mountain that Soen came up with his original mantra, "Namu dai bosa". In 1933 Nakagawa completed his haiku anthology Shigan (Coffin of Poems). That following year, 1934, selections from Shigan were published in the haiku journal Fujin Koron.

== Ryutaku-ji ==
In 1935 Nakagawa accompanied Katsube Roshi to lead a weekend retreat for Tokyo Imperial University students, and realised he forgot the kyosaku (Zen stick). In search of a replacement stick Soen went to a nearby Zen center, Hakusan Dojo, where he heard Myoshin-ji Zen master Gempo Yamamoto speaking. Soen became transfixed by the talk and intrigued by the man. Soen would return to the dojo several times after this encounter. One day, Gempo stated:

If you practice zazen, it must be true practice.

This remark struck a deep and spontaneous chord within Soen, and so he requested dokusan with Gempo following the talk where he expressed the desire to train under him. So Soen became a student of Gempo Yamamoto at Ryutaku-ji. In 1937 Nakagawa makes a trip with Gempo Yamamoto to Xinjing in Japanese-occupied Northeast China, to start a branch of Myoshin-ji Zen with the aim of moralising the slave labor force used in Nissan-owned mining enterprises. Soen had recently begun corresponding with Nyogen Senzaki (now in Los Angeles) in 1935, whose unconventional style of Zen teaching Soen greatly appreciated. In 1938 Yamada Koun was transferred to Xinjing on business where he met Soen again. Here, Soen mentioned to Yamada his earlier dream of one day founding a non-traditional monastery on Dai Bosatsu Mountain in the spirit of Bassui. Yamada and Soen were walking one night together while Yamada was going on about some thing or another, and Soen stopped to say something that sparked Yamada's interest:

Yamada, all you do is argue. Why don't you try sitting?

Years later, Yamada Koun became a Zen monk and roshi, as well. In 1939, Nakagawa returned to Dai Bosatsu Mountain for another solitary retreat. In 1941, Ryutaku-ji is officially recognised as a Rinzai training monastery.

In 1949, Nakagawa made his first trip to the United States where he met Nyogen Senzaki in San Francisco. He found Senzaki's approach to Zen refreshing, and was happy to find a new freedom in expressing himself to followers that would be unheard of in Japan. Free to combine his love for Japanese theater (Noh) into analogies that paralleled sayings of the great Zen masters of the past. Nyogen expressed his wish to Soen that he would like him to stay with him to become his heir, but Soen has responsibilities back at Ryutaku-ji he was unwilling to compromise. The two saw each other again in latter visits to the USA. During this year, Soen also published his Meihen (Life Anthology).

== Hesitation ==
In 1950, Gempo Yamamoto roshi decided it was time for him to retire as abbot of Ryutaku-ji, and he wanted to appoint Soen as head abbot. Soen was hesitant and anxious about the proposition of becoming abbot. He fled the monastery briefly after assuming the position, leaving Gempo with no other choice but to resume the position temporarily. In 1951, Nakagawa returned and resumed his position as abbot at Ryutaku-ji. Soen was a non-traditional abbot, deciding to not distinguish himself from his students. He wore the robe of a monk, he bathed and ate in their quarters. Over the next few years Soen set out to visit other masters stating that, since he had only finished 500 koans of Hakuin's 1700 curriculum, he needed more training. He went to Hosshin-ji and studied under Harada Daiun Sogaku, lineage holder of both the Sōtō and Rinzai school.

In 1954, Soen met a young monk named Tai Shimano (Eido Tai Shimano) at a funeral for Zen priest Daikyu Mineo. In the summer of that year, Tai Shimano ordained as a monk at Ryutaku-ji under Soen's tutelage. In 1955, Soen made his second trip to the United States and Nyogen Senzaki came to Ryutaku-ji to visit with Soen for 6 weeks. In 1957, Keigaku Katsube roshi died. In 1958, Nyogen Senzaki died. Soen was named as the executor of Senzaki's estate and returned to the U.S. to settle Senzakis' affairs. In 1959 and 1960, Soen traveled to the US twice, leading a sesshin in Honolulu, HI during the latter.

In 1961, Gempo Yamamoto roshi died. In 1962, Soen's mother died. Soen and his mother were extraordinarily close. She would visit Ryutaku-ji almost daily to go on excursions into the mountains to talk. They would sit together to have tea, or listen to classical music together. Her death, along with Gempo's death the year before, sent Soen into a depression. He frequented Dai Bosatsu Mountain many times following this for solitary retreat. In 1963, Nakagawa traveled to the United States, India, Israel, Egypt, England, Austria and Denmark with Charles Gooding, a former student of Nyogen Senzaki, teaching Zen with various sanghas.

== Accident, 1967 ==
In 1967, Nakagawa sustained a serious injury surveying the grounds of Ryutaku-ji from the view of a treetop. He slipped on a branch and was left unconscious for three days where he had fallen before being found. He was discovered in a bed of bamboo reeds unexpectedly by one of his monks. He was hospitalised for a long time while being treated for his head injury. Yamada Koun stated he was never quite the same after this accident.

== 1967-1984 ==
In 1968, Nakagawa made his 7th trip to the US to open New York Zendo Shobo-Ji on September 15. In 1969, Nakagawa travelled again to Israel, England, Egypt, New York, California and Hawaii to lead sesshins with sanghas.

In 1971, Nakagawa made his 9th visit to the US, helping The Zen Studies Society (founded by Cornelius Crane) purchase land in the Catskill Mountains for International Dai Bosatsu Zendo. In 1972, Nakagawa made his 10th visit to the United States where he gave Dharma transmission to Eido Tai Shimano. Upon returning to Japan in 1973, Nakagawa retired as abbot of Ryutaku-ji. This same year he published "Ten Haiku of My Choice". In 1974 and 1975, Nakagawa made two more visits to the US, staying first at the still unopened International Dai Bosatsu Zendo, and then going into solitary retreat at New York Zendo Shobo-ji.

In 1976, International Dai Bosatsu Zendo was officially opened. In 1981, Nakagawa published Koun-sho (Ancient Cloud Selection), and in 1982, Nakagawa made his last visit to the US. Upon returning to Ryotaku-ji, Nakagawa became a recluse. In 1984, on March 11, while approaching his 77th birthday, Nakagawa died while taking a bath at Ryutaku-ji.

== Legacy ==
Soen was viewed as an unorthodox, eccentric and controversial teacher within conventional Rinzai circles of his day.

Dharma heirs

- Eido Tai Shimano (not acknowledged by Myoshin-ji)
- Sochu Suzuki, abbot of Ryūtaku-ji 1984–1990
- Kyudo Nakagawa, abbot of Ryūtaku-ji 1990–2007

Notable formal and informal students

- Philip Kapleau
- Robert Baker Aitken
- Paul Reps
- Maurine Stuart
- John Daido Loori
- Denko Mortensen
- Charlotte Joko Beck
- Ryotan Tokuda Igarashi

== Selected works ==
- Shigan (“Coffin of Poems"), 1936
- Meihan (“Life Anthology"), 1949
- Koun-sho (“Ancient Cloud Selection"), 1981
- Hokoju (“Long-lasting Dharma Light"). Posthumous, 1985

== See also ==
- Buddhism in Japan
- Buddhism in the United States
- List of Rinzai Buddhists
- Timeline of Zen Buddhism in the United States

== Sources ==
Printed sources

- Tanahashi, Kazuaki (Ed.). Chayat, Roko Sherry (Ed.). Endless Vow: The Zen Path of Soen Nakagawa. Boston: Shambhala Publications, Inc., 1996. ISBN 1-57062-162-4.
- Nyogen Senzaki, Soen Nakagawa, Eido Shimano, Louis Nordstrom (Ed.) Namu Dai Bosa: a transmission of Zen Buddhism to America. Zen Studies Society, (1976)
- Besserman, Perle. Steger, Manfred. Crazy Clouds: Zen radicals, Rebels & Reformers. Boston: Shambhala Publications, Inc., 1991: ISBN 0-87773-543-3.
- Nakagawa, Soen; Shimano, Eido (1986). The Soen roku: the sayings and doings of Master Soen. The Zen Studies Society Press.

Web-sources
