= Ryūtaku-ji =

Buddhist temple in Shizuoka Prefecture, Japan

- 龍沢寺
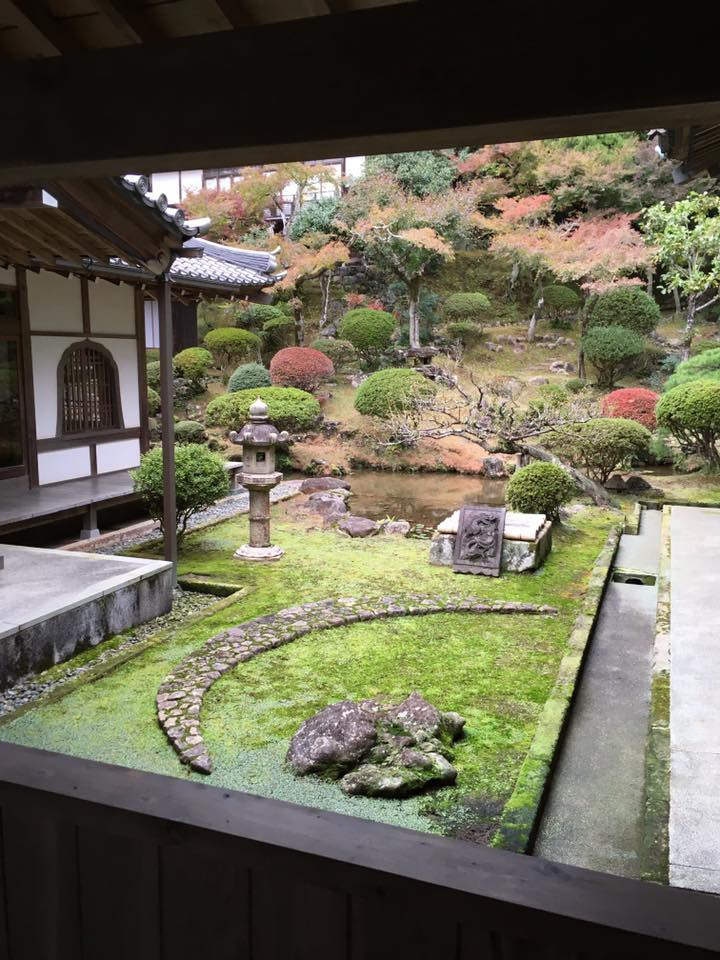
- Garden at Ryūtaku-ji

- Location within Shizuoka Prefecture Location within Japan

Religion
- Affiliation: Buddhism
- Rite: Rinzai school

Location
- Location: 326 Sawaji, Mishima-shi, Shizuoka-ken
- Country: Japan
- Coordinates: 35°08′47″N 138°55′40″E

Architecture
- Founder: Hakuin Ekaku and Tōrei Enji
- Completed: 1760

Ryūtaku-ji (龍澤寺) is a Buddhist temple belonging to the Myōshin-ji branch of the Rinzai school of Japanese Zen, Buddhism located in Mishima, Shizuoka Prefecture, Japan.

== History ==
Temple records have been lost. The temple may have been founded by Kūkai in the Heian period at what is now Atago in Tokyo. It was converted to the Rinzai school in the Keicho era (1596 - 1615) and relocated to Mishima by Hakuin Ekaku in 1761. Although reconstructed in the early Meiji period, it had all but failed into ruins by the Taisho period, until revived by the efforts of Gempō Yamamoto.

== Abbots ==
- Soen Nakagawa, abbot of Ryūtaku-ji until 1984
- Sochu Suzuki, abbot of Ryūtaku-ji 1984-1990
- Kyudo Nakagawa, abbot of Ryūtaku-ji 1990-2007
- Eizan Goto, abbot of Ryūtaku-ji since 2008

== Western transmission ==
During the mid-twentieth century Ryūtaku-ji was led by a number of influential abbots, who encouraged and supported the study of Zen by Westerners. Most notable among these was Soen Nakagawa who was highly regarded as a calligrapher and haiku poet, often referred to as the "20th Century Bassho." Nakagawa's career included regular travel to the United States where he assisted in the founding of the New York Zendo Shobo-ji, and its training monastery in upstate New York. Nakagawa died in 1984 and his ashes were divided with part being interred at Ryūtaku-ji and part in New York.

Nakagawa was known for his enigmatic behavior derived from his dedication to ascetic and solitary Zen practice, and his rejection of the excessive formalism of the Zen hierarchy in Japan.

Kyudo Nakagawa was the abbot of Ryūtaku-ji (as well as Soho Zendo on West Broadway in New York City) up until his death in December 2007. Since January 2008, the new abbot of Ryūtaku-ji is Eizan Goto, who is also the Zen Master of Centre Assise, a meditation center near Paris (France).
