= Clemente Soto Velez Cultural and Educational Center =

Cultural center in Manhattan, New York

Coordinates: 40.719103°N 73.986260°W

The Clemente Soto Vélez Cultural and Educational Center, often called The Clemente, is a Puerto Rican/Latino cultural center named after Puerto Rican writer and activist, Clemente Soto Vélez. The Clemente, which was established as a cultural center in 1993, is located on 107 Suffolk Street in the former PS 160 in Manhattan's historic Lower East Side neighborhood (also known as Loisaida).

In addition to hosting programming related to Peforma and IDEAS City, the Center is also home to Teatro La Tea, LEFT (Latino Experimental Fantastic Theater), and the leading children’s company SEA, believed to be the only bilingual puppet theatre in the United States.

The organization is based in an 1897 city-owned building formerly known as P.S. 160, and designed by the architect Charles B. J. Snyder in the collegiate neo-gothic style. It is a representative example of the large number of school buildings that were erected in New York City in the late nineteenth century. In the 1970s, a fire caused the school to be vacated and it remained so until 1981, when Solidaridad Humana, a community based educational organization, began to use the building as a school for Spanish-speaking immigrants. Since 1993 the administration of The Clemente has been managing a growing program of long term studios for artists, available at a subsidized license fee.

The Clemente has developed an on-going performing arts and exhibition programming, and houses 4 theaters, 3 exhibition galleries, 46 subsidized artists studios, and 12 subsidized offices for arts and education non-for-profit organizations.

In December 2019, urban anthropologist, scholar, curator and cultural organizer/producer, Libertad O. Guerra, previously Director and Chief Curator of the Loisaida Cultural Center, was selected as Executive Director of the Clemente Soto Vélez Cultural and Educational Center.

== Clemente Soto Vélez Cultural and Educational Center ==
The Clemente Soto Vélez Cultural and Educational Center a landmark in Lower East Side. The Dutch Neo-Gothic building was designed as a public school by Charles B. J. Snyder. He is widely recognized for his transformation of school building design and quality during his tenure as Superintendent of School Buildings of the New York City Board of Education between 1891 and 1923.

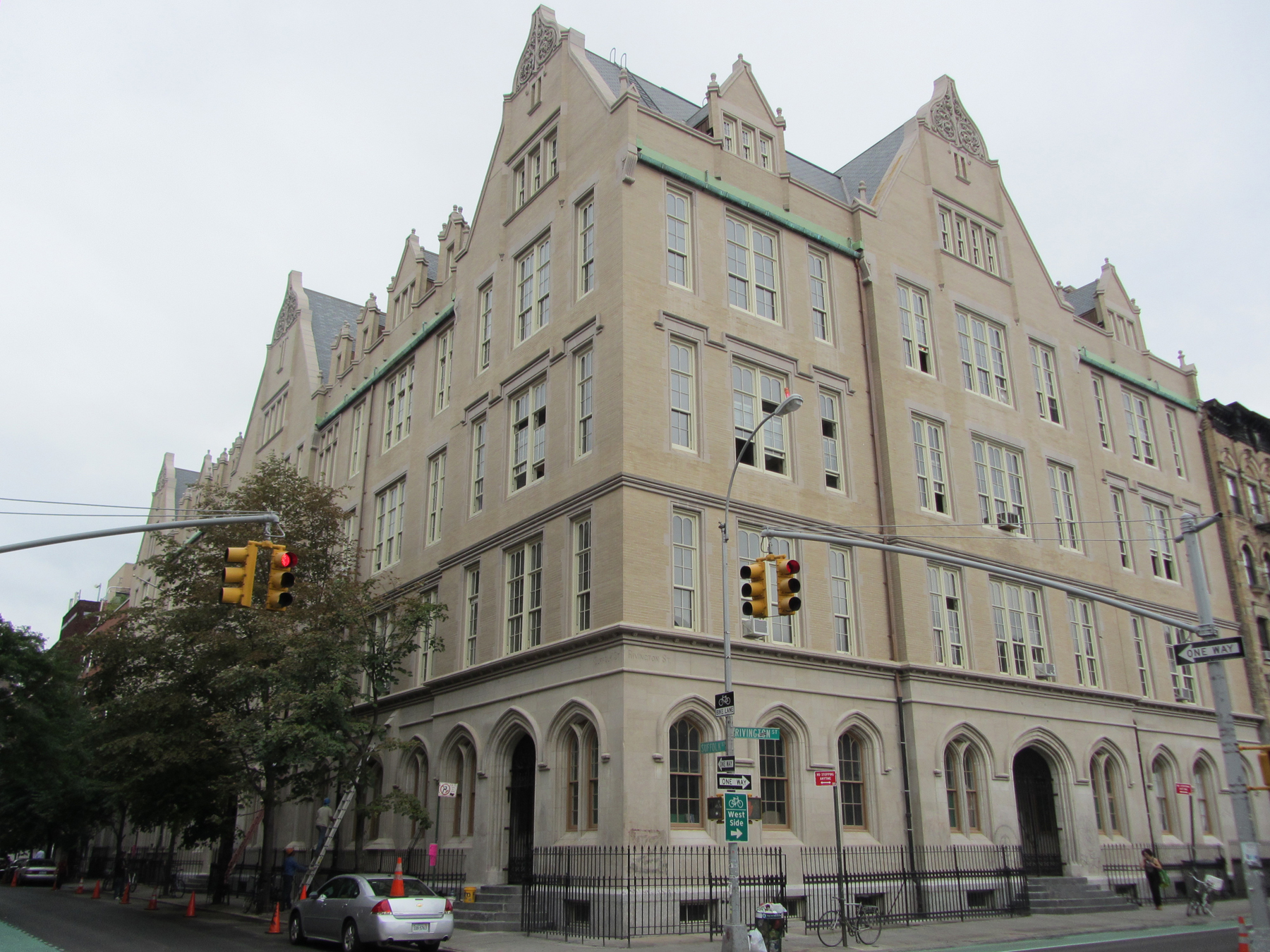
The Clemente Soto Vélez Cultural & Educational Center is the foremost architectural landmark in that part of the Lower East Side.

Snyder perceived school buildings as civic monuments that would better society and sought to provide spaces for learning that would offer a respite from noisy streets and poverty.

He was concerned with health and safety issues in public schools and focused on fire protection, ventilation, lighting, and classroom size. Snyder used terra cotta blocks in floor construction to improve fireproofing, and large and numerous windows to allow more light and air into the classrooms.

The subject building, located on a corner lot, is L-shaped in configuration and five stories in height. A dramatic steeply pitched roof line punctuated by dormers defines the street facades.

The building has a rich variety of ornamental details in terra cotta, limestone and brick. At the time the project commenced, many of the original wood windows remained while others had been replaced with less ornate wood or aluminum frames. An iron fence surrounds the facility at the street facades and there are five entrance vestibules with wrought iron gates, bluestone steps and mosaic tile floors.

After over a century of service without substantial rehabilitation, the building was in poor condition when Superstructures began an investigation of the exterior in 2006. By that point there had been a sidewalk shed in place for eight years due to the deteriorated condition of the façade.

The complete exterior restoration completed in 2012 under the direction of Superstructures Engineers + Architects included roof replacement and repair, replacement of bulkheads and copper gutters, replacement and/or repair of brick masonry, restoration or replacement of terra cotta, replacement and/or restoration of windows, cleaning of limestone and terrazzo. The NYC Department of Cultural Affairs and NYC Department of Citywide Administrative Services funded the project, which was managed by the NYC Department of Design and Construction. In 2013 the exterior restoration project was recognized by the New York Landmarks Conservancy with its prestigious Lucy G. Moses Preservation Award.

== From PS 160 to Clemente Soto Vélez Cultural Center and Educational Center ==
The building served as PS 160 until the mid-seventies. In 1984 it became the home of Solidaridad Humana, a community-based bilingual education program.

In 1993, Edgardo Vega Yunqué, Nelson Landrieu and Mateo Gómez, all of whom are actively involved in the Latino arts community of New York City, founded the Clemente Soto Vélez as a cultural and educational center. At the time, Teatro La Tea, established by Landrieu and Gómez, was already based at 107 Suffolk Street. Less than a year later, the trio acquired the lease to the building from Solidaridad Humana.

The Clemente Soto Vélez is a Puerto Rican/Latino cultural institution that has a broad-minded cultural vision and a collaborative philosophy.

The Clemente currently provides studio space for over two dozen artists, as well as a home for the following institutions:

- Hispanic Organization for Latin Actors (HOLA), committed to exploring and expanding available avenues for projecting Hispanic artists into the mainstream.
- Afro Brazil Arts / Capoeira Angola Quintal, whose mission is to inspire achievement through capoeira, a Brazilian martial art that incorporates music and dancing.
- Fantastic Experimental Latino Theater (FELT), offering interactive theater and educational programs.
- Mark DeGarmo & Dancers/Dynamic Forms Inc, providing a comprehensive arts experience to economically disadvantaged students .
- The Society of the Educational Arts, Inc. (SEA), a bilingual arts-in-education organization & Latino theatre company for young audiences.
- Teatro LaTea, one of New York’s premier Off-Off-Broadway Latino theaters.

== Exhibitions and Initiatives ==
In 2022, an exhibition curated by Yasmeen Abdallah and Anna Shukeylo titled "To Have And To Hold" was presented. The show was inspired by memories of the Manhattan's Lower East Side neighborhood. Participating artists included Maria De Los Angeles and Julia Justo among others.

The Clemente announced in October 2025 that it would launch Nueva York Chronicles, an interactive digital archive rooted in a map of New York City's five boroughs to preserve the records of Latin American immigrant communities in the city.
