= Manuel A Morán =

Puerto Rican actor and founder of Society of the Educational Arts

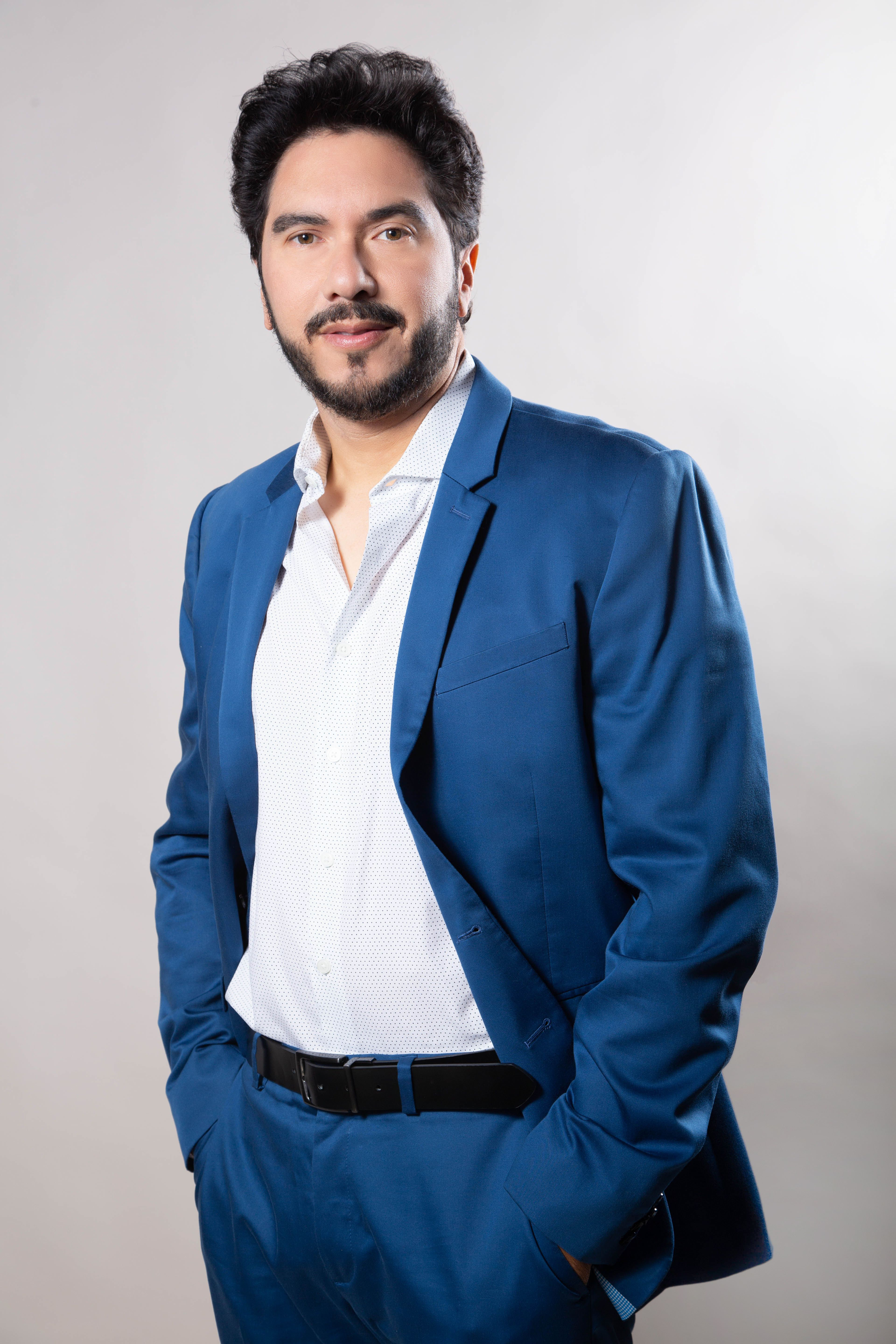
Manuel A. Morán

Manuel A. Morán (born 29 November 1969) is a Puerto Rican actor, singer, writer, composer, puppeteer, theater and film director and producer. He is the Founder and Artistic Director of the Latino Children's Theater, Teatro SEA, (Society of the Educational Arts, Inc.).

== Early life and education ==
Manuel Morán was born in 1969, in San Juan. He was raised in the town of Vega Baja in the north of Puerto Rico. At age 14 in 1985, he began creating everything he needed for a theater company. When he was 15, he formed his own theater company, called Producciones Fantasía. He studied Drama and Humanities at the Drama Department of the University of Puerto Rico (UPR). At age 17, in 1987, his production called El Niño Semilla was presented at Centro de Bellas Artes in Santurce, as part of the Festival de Teatro Infantil hosted by the Instituto de Cultura Puertorriqueña.

In 1991, he moved to New York to continue graduate studies at New York University (NYU). In 1993, he completed a Master's Degree in Educational and Musical Theater and continued his studies there towards a Ph.D. degree in Educational Theater. His doctoral dissertation was named "The Development of Teatro Escolar, The Theater Program of the Public Education System in Puerto Rico: From 1960 to 1990" (New York University, 2005). He also studied at universities in Philadelphia, London, and Santander, Spain.

== Career ==
His first company, Producciones Fantasia, produced its first show in 1985. It was rebranded as Teatro SEA: Society of the Educational Arts in 1993.

In 1993, he brought theater to New York City schools, established programs for art departments, and fought for the integration of the arts into school curriculums. The Board of Education of New York City entrusted him with the role of bringing arts education to the East Harlem school district.

In 1999 he inaugurated Teatro SEA @ Los Kabayitos Puppet & Children's Theater at The Clemente Soto Vélez Cultural Center in Manhattan's Lower East Side. This 50-seat theater remained as the company's mainstage until 2009. The organization hosts the only theater in the United States dedicated solely to Latino Children's Theater.

Since opening, the theater has amassed a repertoire of more than 20 shows involving arts-in-education and puppetry.

Celebrating Teatro SEA's 25th Anniversary in 2010, he opened a 150-seats, state-of-the-art performance space at The Clemente Center on Manhattan's Lower East Side. The organization currently has offices in San Juan, Puerto Rico, New York, and Florida.

Currently he is the producer and the star of the bilingual web-series and musical band, El Avión-The Airplane.

== Puppetry ==
He started performing puppet shows in his native Puerto Rico in 3rd grade after he saw a performance of Leopoldo Santiago Lavandero's La Plenópera del Empache.

His doctoral dissertation is about Leopoldo Santiago Lavandero, who he considers the father of Educational Theater and Puppetry in Puerto Rico, and about the historical development of theater education and puppet theater on the island.

He was selected as one of "40 under 40 Young Master Puppeteers World-wide" by Puppetry International Magazine, Spring & Summer Issue # 25, April, 2009.

He is a member of the Puppeteers of America and UNIMA-USA organizations. He was the Vice President of UNIMA International. In 2012, he entered the Executive Committee of UNIMA. From 2016 to 2020, he was the President of UNIMA's Three America's Commission. He was the president of UNIMA-USA, Inc. from 2016-2017.

From 2017 to 2020, he was the Director of the online Latin American Puppetry Magazine "La Hoja del Titiritero"

For 6 years he worked on researching, compiling material and filming interviews about puppetry in the Hispanic Caribbean (Cuba, Dominican Republic and Puerto Rico). His three-episode documentary, "Titeres: Puppetry in the Caribbean'' (34) premiered at the Havana Film Festival in Cuba in 2016. Since then, the films have been presented in the Caribbean, Latin America, and the United States.

In 2018 he founded and produced the 1st International Puppet Fringe Festival of NYC. This major festival presented over 40 national and international events and performances.

In 2021, he was featured in a front-page New York Times article which discussed the International Puppet Fringe Festival and his efforts to preserve the art of puppetry.

== Publications ==
In April 2016 his first book Migrant Theater for Children: A Caribbean in New York was published.

In 2017 his second book: 'Mantequilla/Butter; Adventures and Tribulations of a Puerto Rican Boy (SEA Publications, 2017) was published.

His original bilingual puppet scripts and adaptations (over 20 titles) were published as an illustrated book series, Libros-Teatro (Theater-Books). The 1st 8 books were released in January, 2021.

== Works ==
Plays & Musicals Produced by Manuel A. Morán:

- "Las Leyendas del Cofre Encantado; Indigenous Tales of the Americas," Co-written with Richard Marino
- "El Encuentro de Juan Bobo y Pedro Animal (The Encounter),"
- "La Caperucita Roja,"

Revision May, 2017 "La Verdadera Historia de Caperucita/The True Story of Little Red"

- "La Cucarachita Martina/Martina, The Little Roach," Co-written with Iván A. Bautista & Rafael Carrasquillo
- "Cenicienta/Cinderella,"
- "Cenicienta Tanguera/A Tango Dancing Cinderella"
- "Mi Chivita Mágica/My Magical Chivita, The Colorful Colombian Bus,"
- "Ricitos y los 3 Ositos/Ricitos & The Three Bears,"
- "Viva Pinocho! A Mexican Pinocchio"
- "La muela del rey Farfán,"
- "My Superhero, Roberto Clemente," March, 2014
- "Sueño: A Latino Take on Shakespeare's A Midsummer Night's Dream,"
- "The Colors of Frida,"
- "The Galápagos Animal Convention," November, 2019
- "César Chávez and the Migrants (The César Chávez Story)"
- "The Belly-Ache Opera/La Plenópera del Empache"
- "The Pura Belpré Project"

From teatrosea.org:

- "A tres voces"
- "Juan Bobo's Tales/Los cuentos de Juan Bobo"
- "Los Grises/The Gray Ones"
- "Pedro Animal Falls in Love/Pedro Animal se enamora"
- "Rafael Hernández...Romance"
- "Skeletons/A Day of the Dead Bedtime Story"
- "The 3 Pigettes & The Big Bad Lady Wolf/ Las 3 cerditas ya la loba feroz"
- "The Dropouts Crew/ Los Desertores"
- "The Gloria, A Latin Cabaret/ La Gloria, un Cabaret Latino"

Films Directed by Manuel A. Morán:

- Director of a 3 Episodes-Documentary: "Títeres en el Caribe Hispano: Cuba, República Dominicana y Puerto Rico," 2016

Music Records Produced by Manuel A. Morán:

- Musical Album: "A Volar, Let's Fly" Music and Lyrics by Manuel Morán

== Festivals ==
Morán has established and produced various community and arts and theater festivals including:

- BORIMIX, Puerto Rico Fest (NYC) Established 2005
- Arte pa' mi gente/Arts for all Festival (NYC)
- Teatro Fest (Co-production - NYC)
- Three Kings Day Celebration/Festival (NYC)
- MicroTheaterNY (NYC)
- The International Puppet Fringe Festival (NYC)

== Awards and recognition ==
UNIMA-USA Citation of Excellence for "La Muela del Rey Farfán/The Toothache of King Farfan" Wilmington, NC, July, 2010.

The Cristian Rivera Foundation Humanitarian Award, NYC, 2012

Best Documentary Film - Association of Latin Critics, New York, April, 2017.

Best Documentary Film - International Puerto Rican Heritage Film Festival, New York, November, 2017.

Viva Loisaida Award, Loisaida Festival, NYC, 2018

Dedication of 14th International Puppetry Biennial of Puerto Rico (Bienal Internacional de Títeres de Puerto Rico), 2020

== Personal life ==
Manuel A. Morán is the father of Manuel Gabriel. They live in New York City and in San Juan, Puerto Rico.
