= Jack Tworkov =

American abstract expressionist painter

- Tworkov circa 1950
- Born: Yakov Tworkovsky; 15 August 1900; Biała Podlaska, Poland
- Died: 4 September 1982 (aged 82); Provincetown, Massachusetts, United States
- Education: National Academy of Design, Art Students League of New York
- Known for: Painting
- Movement: Abstract expressionism
- Relatives: Janice Biala (sister); Helen Tworkov (daughter)

Jack Tworkov (August 15, 1900 – September 4, 1982) was an American abstract expressionist painter.

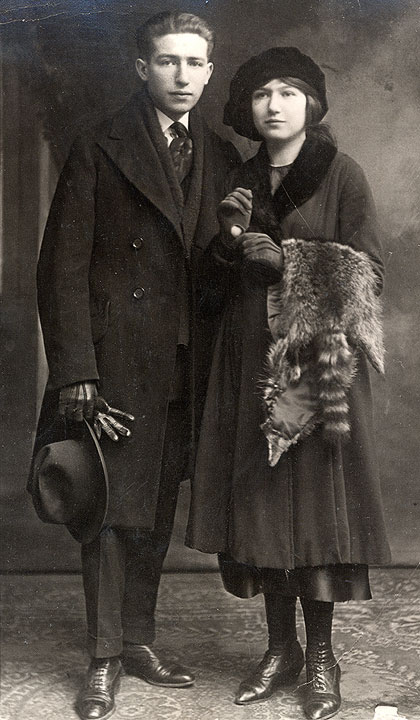
1921-Tworkov-Biala

== Early life and education ==
Tworkov was born Yakov Tworkovsky on August 15, 1900 in Biała Podlaska, a Polish city then-part of the Russian Empire, to a Yiddish-speaking Ashkenazi family. His father, Hyman, immigrated to the United States in the early 1910s with his children from his first marriage. There, he established himself as a tailor. Tworkov, his mother Esther (née Singer), and his younger sister Schenehaia joined him there in 1913. After they settled in New York, the family used the surname Bernstein, which was the surname of a relative who'd sponsored their immigration, and he and his sister began using the names Jack and Janice. The family lived in a tenement on Eldridge Street and operated a store on Ludlow Street in Manhattan.

Tworkov was initially uninterested in painting and instead attended Columbia University to become a writer. His sister encouraged him to attend classes at the Art Students League of New York. The League proved influential for Tworkov's art career, sparking his interest in the field art. Two of his major influences early on were painters Cézanne and Matisse. Their influence along with his sisters prompted him to study art at the National Academy of Design and Art Students League of New York.

== Career ==
In 1924, he joined friends Yosl Cutler and Zuni Maud to be set and costume designers for Maurice Schwartz's production of Abraham Goldfaden's Di Kishefmacherin. They created puppets for the show and decided to launch a puppet theatre. The trio expanded their early work during a summer spent in the Catskills, at a summer home of left wing painters and writers, who offered opinions. In 1925 the trio opened the Modjacot (a portmanteau of their names) Spiel Theatre, the first Yiddish puppet theatre in America. Tworkov dropped out, and the amalgam name became Modicot.

In 1929 America entered into the great depression; following the economic collapse President Franklin D. Roosevelt initiated the Work Projects Administration. Tworkov, being an aspiring artist, sought employment as a member of the Federal Art Project division of the Work Projects Administration, which is where he met one of the first artists responsible for bringing Abstract Expressionism to the attention of the American public, Willem de Kooning. This is the time in which Tworkov's art begins to take on the early signs of Abstract Expressionism style. Tworkov and de Koonig met many other abstract painters, and together with a group of abstract expressionists including Arshile Gorky, Mark Rothko and Jackson Pollock, founded the New York School. Many of the people involved in creating the New York School including Tworkov were also involved with the creating of the 8th Street Club, which was responsible for hosting the 9th Street Art Exhibition, which was largely regarded as the event in which the New York School style was truly exposed to the American people.

During his lifetime, Tworkov taught at several institutions, including the American University, Black Mountain College, Queens College, Pratt Institute, University of Minnesota, Columbia University, and Yale University where he was the chairman of the Art Department from 1963 to 1969. As chairman, Tworkov invited known artists to teach, including Al Held, Knox Martin, George Wardlaw, and Bernard Chaet. Among the students of that era were Chuck Close, Jennifer Bartlett, Richard Serra, Nancy Graves, Rackstraw Downes, and Brice Marden. In 1970, he was awarded a Guggenheim Fellowship for Fine Arts.

Tworkov is regarded as an important and influential artist, along with Rothko, de Kooning, Philip Guston, Franz Kline, and Pollock, whose gestural paintings of the early 1950s formed the basis for the abstract expressionist movement in America. Major work from this period is characterized by the use of gestural brush strokes in flame-like color. His work transitioned during the mid-1960s. Straight lines and geometric patterns characterize his later art work. Wedding Flags of 1965, included in the Governor Nelson A. Rockefeller Empire State Plaza Art Collection in Albany, NY, is a transitional painting that combines both abstract expressionism and geometric abstraction.

Despite being credited as one of the founders of the New York School, Tworkov's later works of art diverged from this style of painting. After the 1950s one can see from Tworkov's art that he took a more geometric approach to his work; this is shown in his work, Indian Red Series #2 (1979). Tworkov's experiments with geometric shapes were largely inspired by basic geometry and number systems, as well as the well-known Fibonacci number sequence.

What was formerly the UBS Art Gallery in New York exhibited five decades of Tworkov's work in the 2009 show Against Extremes, "a tantalizing historical survey" charting everything from his de Kooning roots to his omnipresent "dream of freedom".

== Personal life ==
Tworkov died in 1982 in Provincetown, Massachusetts, two years after being diagnosed with bone cancer. He is buried in Provincetown Cemetery alongside his third wife, Rachel Tworkov (née Wolodofsky; 1916 – 1991). The two married in 1935 and remained married until his passing. He is survived by his two daughters, Hermine Ford Moskowitz, who is also an artist, and Helen Tworkov, a Zen Buddhist author and magazine editor.

== Catalogs ==
- Edward Bryant; Jack Tworkov: Whitney Museum of American Art Publisher: Whitney Museum of American Art, NY ©1964. OCLC: 7607995
- Jack Tworkov; Andrew Forge; Solomon R. Guggenheim Museum, Jack Tworkov, Fifteen Years of Painting : Solomon R. Guggenheim Museum, New York Publisher: Solomon R. Guggenheim Foundation, NY 1982. ISBN 0-89207-033-1, ISBN 978-0-89207-033-6
- Richard Armstrong, Jack Tworkov : paintings 1928-1982 Publisher: Pennsylvania Academy of the Fine Arts, PA © 1987. ISBN 0-943836-08-5
- Elizabeth Frank; Andre Emmerich Gallery, New York, NY Jack Tworkov: Paintings from 1930 to 1981 © 1991.
- Alston Conley; Boston College Museum of Art, Chestnut Hill, MA; Jack Tworkov 1935-1982: An Abstract Expressionist Inventing Form © 1994
- Jack Tworkov; Mitchell-Innes & Nash and Ameringer Howard Yohe Gallery, Jack Tworkov : red, white and blue Publisher: Mitchell-Innes & Nash : Ameringer/Howard/Yohe, 2002. ISBN 0-9713844-4-4, ISBN 978-0-9713844-4-6
- Debra Bricker Balken; Valerie Carberry Gallery, Chicago, IL Jack Tworkov: Early Paintings and Drawings © 2006. ISBN 0-9777686-0-0
- “DE SARTHE, Hong Kong” & Estate of Jack Tworkov; Jack Tworkov 1900-1982: Pioneer of Abstract Expressionism - A Survey © 2026
