= Helen Tworkov =

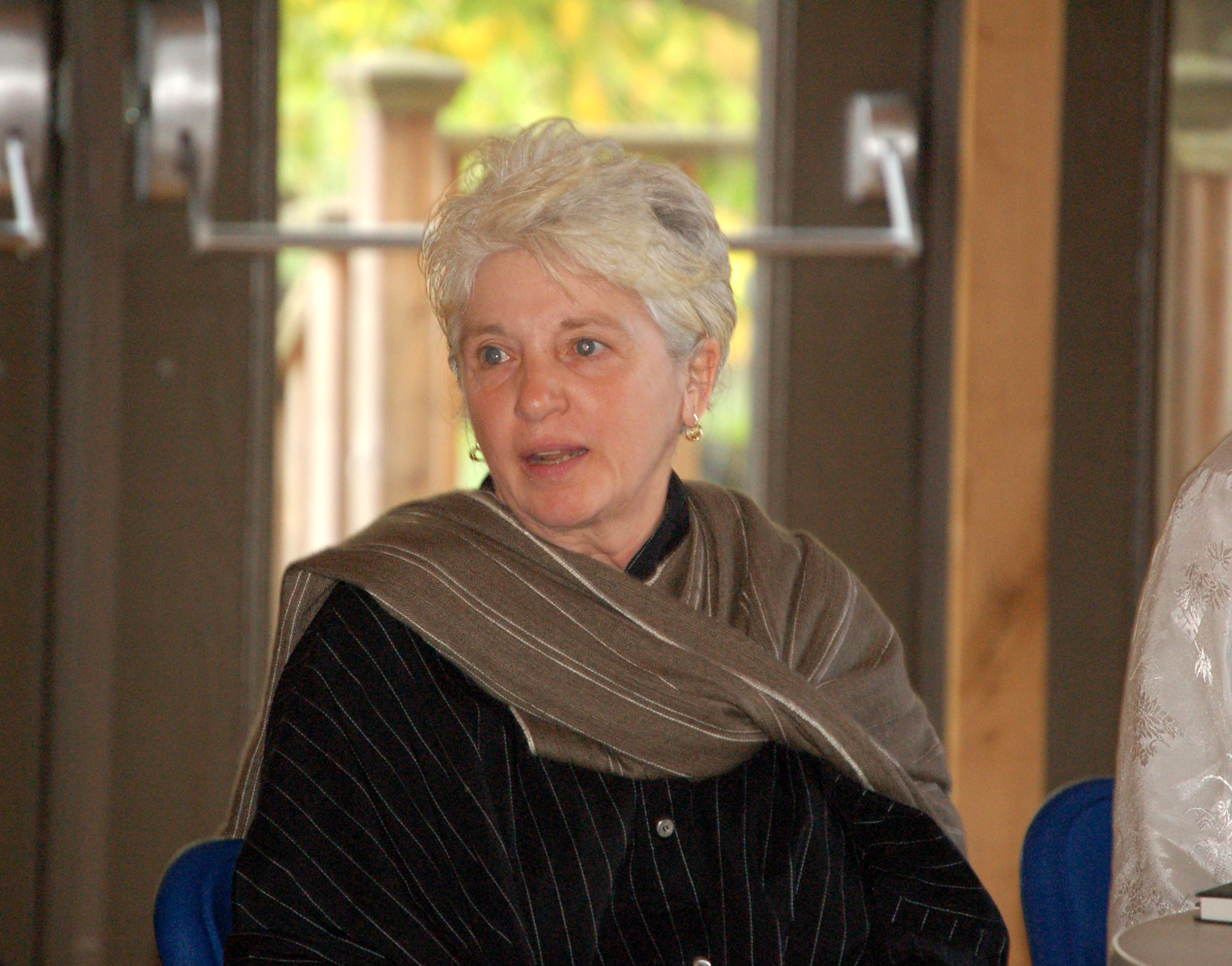
- Helen Tworkov, founding editor of Tricycle: The Buddhist Review
- Title: Author; founding editor of Tricycle: The Buddhist Review

Personal life
- Born: Helen Tworkov; 1943 (age 82–83) New York City, New York, U.S.
- Parent: Jack Tworkov (father)
- Education: Hunter College (anthropology)
- Occupation: Writer; magazine editor
- Website: www.helentworkov.com

Religious life
- Religion: Buddhism
- School: Zen; Tibetan Buddhism
- Lineage: Kagyu; Nyingma

Senior posting
- Teacher: Yongey Mingyur Rinpoche
- Based in: New York and Nova Scotia

Helen Tworkov is founding editor of Tricycle: The Buddhist Review, the first and only independent Buddhist magazine, and author of Zen in America: Profiles of Five Teachers (North Point Press, 1989; Kodansha, 1994). She first encountered Buddhism in Asia in the 1960s and has studied in both the Zen and Tibetan traditions. Since 2006 she has been a student of the Kagyu and Nyingma Tibetan master Yongey Mingyur Rinpoche, and has most recently assisted him in the writing of In Love with the World: A Monk's Journey Through the Bardos of Living and Dying, ISBN 9780525512547.

== Biography ==
Helen Tworkov was born in 1943, in New York City, into a family of artists where creative expression was highly valued but formal religion was not a central part of family life. Growing up in the cultural environment of mid-20th century New York, she developed an early interest in exploring questions of truth, purpose, and the nature of the self, seeking meaning beyond her secular upbringing. Her father was the Polish-born American painter Jack Tworkov.

Tworkov studied Anthropology at Hunter College of the City University of New York, where her academic focus supported her developing interest in the cultural and historical dimensions of Buddhism. In 1991, she co-founded Tricycle, which became a major platform for contemporary Buddhist teaching and discussion in the United States. Under her leadership, the magazine featured contributions from leading Buddhist scholars and practitioners and helped broaden public engagement with Buddhist thought.

Tworkov is the author of Zen in America: Profiles of Five Teachers (North Point Press, 1989; Kodansha, 1994), a landmark study of the development of Zen Buddhism in the United States and its early teachers. Since 2006, she has been a student of Tibetan Buddhist master Yongey Mingyur Rinpoche of the Kagyu and Nyingma lineages and has collaborated with him on several writing projects, including the book In Love with the World: A Monk’s Journey Through the Bardos of Living and Dying.

Tworkov is widely recognized for her role in shaping contemporary American Buddhist thought. Drawing from multiple traditions, she emphasizes nonsectarian engagement with Buddhist teachings and frequently reflects on the evolving relationship between Buddhism and Western culture. She continues to write and teach, maintaining an influential presence in the field.

== Bibliography ==
- Tworkov, Helen (2024). Lotus Girl: My Life at the Crossroads of Buddhism and America. St. Martin's. ISBN 9781250321558.
- Tworkov, Helen (1989). Zen in America: Profiles of Five Teachers. North Point Press. ISBN 0-86547-354-4. (Expanded edition published by Kodansha in 1994.)

With Yongey Mingyur Rinpoche:

- In Love with the World: A Monk's Journey Through the Bardos of Living and Dying. Penguin Random House, 2019. ISBN 9780525512547
- Turning Confusion into Clarity: A Guide to the Foundation Practices of Tibetan Buddhism. Snow Lion, 2014. ISBN 9781611801217
