= Great Small Works =

- Formation: 1995
- Type: Theatre group
- Purpose: Avant-garde, folk, and popular theater
- Location: New York City
- Members: John Bell, Trudi Cohen, Stephen Kaplin, Jenny Romaine, Roberto Rossi, and Mark Sussman

Great Small Works is a performance collective founded in New York City in 1995. Its six founding members—John Bell, Trudi Cohen, Stephen Kaplin, Jenny Romaine, Roberto Rossi, and Mark Sussman—draw on avant-garde, folk, and popular theater traditions to address contemporary social issues in a various scales, from tiny toy theater spectacles to giant puppet pageants.

== Events ==
Since their inception, Great Small Works has hosted frequent Spaghetti Dinner events, where the company members cook and serve spaghetti with vegetarian sauce to their audience, followed by a cabaret-style variety show involving puppetry, music and other forms of live entertainment. Great Small Works has also hosted several festivals of toy theater that bring artists and performers from all over the world to perform and display their interpretations of the 19th-century art form. Great Small Works members create and perform their own toy theater productions, and as a collective have made ten installments of Terror As Usual, an episodic toy theater serial that combines surrealism with current events.

== Other productions ==
=== Small-scale works ===
"Toy Theater Faust" and "Olivier's Hamlet", directed by John Bell and designed by Stephen Kaplin; "A Walk in the City", adapted from a story by Italo Calvino, directed and designed by Roberto Rossi; "Soil Desire People Dance", directed and designed by Mark Sussman and Roberto Rossi; "Three Books in the Garden", about the renaissance and religious tolerance in Cordoba, Spain, created by Trudi Cohen, John Bell, and Isaac Bell; "The White Pajamas", directed by Jenny Romaine. "B.B. in L.A"; about Bertholt Brecht's time spent living in the United States; two shows for kids, "Our Kitchen", created by Trudi Cohen; "Kasper in Metropolis", created by Roberto Rossi and George Konnoff; two cantastorias, "The History of Oil", and "The True Story of CHARAS", and "Lyzer the Miser", created by John Bell, Trudi Cohen, and Isaac Bell.

=== Large-scale works ===
1996, "A History of Apizza in New Haven", an outdoor circus pageant, for the First International Festival of Arts and Ideas in New Haven. 1998, "The Bread and Roses Pageant" with students and teachers at the Bread & Roses Integrated Arts High School in Harlem. 2001, "the Procession to End All Evil" for the D.U.M.B.O Art Under the Bridge Festival in downtown Brooklyn. New street processions annually in D.U.M.B.O since then, most recently, "The Spectacle of the Rising Tide" in 2006. Also in 2006 "The Rising Tide Parade" for the Lower Manhattan Cultural Council as the opening event of the summer River to River Festival.

=== Full-length works ===
"A Mammal's Notebook: The Erik Satie Cabaret" 2001; The Memoirs of Glückel of Hameln; " The Man Who Was Thursday: A Nightmare", 1997-’98 "The Rapture Project" 2007

== Awards ==
Great Small Works received a 2005 Puppeteers of America Jim Henson Award for Innovation in the Field of Puppetry, a 1997 Village Voice OBIE Award grant, and a 1997 UNIMA Citation for excellence in puppetry. They are listed in NYC Arts, The Complete Guide.

== Other projects ==
Great Small Works members are in involved in many other performance projects, including Circus Amok and Chinese Theater Works in New York City, the HONK! Festival in Boston, and Vermont's Bread and Puppet Theater.
