= Neo-Vedanta =

Interpretation of Hinduism

Neo-Vedanta, also called neo-Hinduism, Hindu modernism, Global Hinduism and Hindu Universalism, are terms to characterise interpretations of Hinduism that developed in the 19th century. The term "Neo-Vedanta" was coined by German Indologist Paul Hacker, in a pejorative way, to distinguish modern developments from "traditional" Advaita Vedanta.

Scholars have repeatedly argued that these modern interpretations incorporate Western ideas into traditional Indian religions, especially Advaita Vedanta, which is asserted as central or fundamental to Hindu culture. Other scholars have described a Greater Advaita Vedānta, (Note: Allen has coined the term while drawing on the work of Balasubramanian,. See Balasubramanian, R., 2000, "Introduction" in History of Science, Philosophy and Culture in Indian civilization: Volume II Part 2 Advaita Vedanta. Delhi: Centre for Studies in Civilizations.) which developed since the medieval period. (Note: Many of these traditions, which were influential among Neo-Vedantins, did not derive from Vedantic lineages, i.e., the "Advaita Vedanta" of Shankara. As the scholar J. Madaio points out "...it is possible to speak of sanskritic and vernacular advaitic texts (which are either explicitly non-dualistic or permit a non-dualistic reading) and 'Advaita Vedanta' texts which originate within sampradayas that claim an Advaita Vedantic lineage. This, then, avoids the obfuscating tendency to subsume advaitic but non-vedantic works under a 'Vedanta' or 'Advaita Vedanta' umbrella.") Drawing on this broad pool of sources, after Muslim rule in India was replaced by that of the East India Company, Hindu religious and political leaders and thinkers responded to Western colonialism and orientalism, contributing to the Indian independence movement and the modern national and religious identity of Hindus in the Republic of India. This societal aspect is covered under the term of Hindu reform movements.

Among the main proponents of such modern interpretations of Hinduism were Vivekananda, Aurobindo and Radhakrishnan, who to some extent also contributed to the emergence of Neo-Hindu movements in the West.

Neo-Vedanta has been influential in the perception of Hinduism, both in the west and in the higher educated classes in India. It has received appraisal for its "solution of synthesis", but has also been criticised for its Universalism. The terms "Neo-Hindu" or "Neo-Vedanta" themselves have also been criticised for its polemical usage, the prefix "Neo-" then intended to imply that these modern interpretations of Hinduism are "inauthentic" or in other ways problematic.

== Definition and etymology ==
According to Halbfass, the terms "Neo-Vedanta" and "Neo-Hinduism" refer to "the adoption of Western concepts and standards and the readiness to reinterpret traditional ideas in light of these new, imported and imposed modes of thought". Prominent in Neo-Vedanta is Vivekananda, whose theology, according to Madaio, is often characterised in earlier scholarship as "a rupture from 'traditional' or 'classical' Hindusim, particularly the 'orthodox' Advaita Vedanta of the eighth century Shankara".

The term "Neo-Vedanta" appears to have arisen in Bengal in the 19th century, where it was used by both Indians and Europeans. Brian Hatcher wrote that "the term neo-Vedanta was first coined by Christian commentators, some of whom were firsthand observers of developments in Brahmo theology... engaged in open, sometimes acrimonious debates with the Brahmos, whom they partly admired for their courage in abandoning traditions of polytheism and image worship but whom they also scorned for having proffered to other Hindus a viable alternative to conversion." Halbfass wrote that "it seems likely" that the term "Neo-Hinduism" was invented by a Bengali, Brajendra Nath Seal (1864–1938), who used the term to characterise the literary work of Bankim Chandra Chatterjee (1838–1894).

The term "neo-Vedanta" was used by Christian missionaries as well as Hindu traditionalists to criticise the emerging ideas of the Brahmo Samaj, a critical usage whose "polemical undertone [...] is obvious".

Ayon Maharaj, also known as Swami Medhananda regards the continued scholarly use of the term "Neo-Vedanta" as only a "seemingly benign practice". Maharaj asserts that the term Neo-Vedanta "is misleading and unhelpful for three main reasons":

First, a vague umbrella term such as "Neo-Vedanta" fails to capture the nuances of the specific Vedantic views of different modern figures.... Second, the term "Neo-Vedanta" misleadingly implies novelty.... Third, and most problematically, the term "Neo-Vedanta" is indelibly colored by German indologist Paul Hacker's polemical use of the term.

The term "neo-Hinduism" was used by a Jesuit scholar resident in India, Robert Antoine (1914–1981), from whom it was borrowed by Paul Hacker, who used it to demarcate these modernist ideas from "surviving traditional Hinduism," and treating the Neo-Advaitins as "dialogue partners with a broken identity who cannot truly and authentically speak for themselves and for the Indian tradition". Hacker made a distinction between "Neo-Vedanta" and "neo-Hinduism", seeing nationalism as a prime concern of "neo-Hinduism".

== History ==
Although neo-Vedanta developed in the 19th century in response to Western colonialism, it has deeper origins in the Muslim period of India. Michael S. Allen and Anand Venkatkrishnan note that Shankara is well-studied, but "scholars have yet to provide even a rudimentary, let alone comprehensive account of the history of Advaita Vedanta in the centuries leading up to the colonial period."

=== "Greater Advaita Vedanta" ===
==== Unification of Hinduism ====
Well before the advent of British influence, with beginnings that some scholars have argued significantly predate Islamic influence, hierarchical classifications of the various orthodox schools were developed. According to Nicholson, already between the twelfth and the sixteenth century,

... certain thinkers began to treat as a single whole the diverse philosophical teachings of the Upanishads, epics, Puranas, and the schools known retrospectively as the "six systems" (saddarsana) of mainstream Hindu philosophy.

The tendency of "a blurring of philosophical distinctions" has also been noted by Mikel Burley. Lorenzen locates the origins of a distinct Hindu identity in the interaction between Muslims and Hindus, and a process of "mutual self-definition with a contrasting Muslim other", which started well before 1800. Both the Indian and the European thinkers who developed the term "Hinduism" in the 19th century were influenced by these philosophers.

Within these so-called doxographies Advaita Vedanta was given the highest position, since it was regarded to be the most inclusive system. Vijnanabhiksu, a 16th-century philosopher and writer, is still an influential proponent of these doxographies. He's been a prime influence on 19th century Hindu modernists like Vivekananda, who also tried to integrate various strands of Hindu thought, taking Advaita Vedanta as its most representative specimen.

==== Influence of yogic tradition ====
While Indologists like Paul Hacker and Wilhelm Halbfass took Shankara's system as the measure for an "orthodox" Advaita Vedanta, the living Advaita Vedanta tradition in medieval times was influenced by, and incorporated elements from, the yogic tradition and texts like the Yoga Vasistha and the Bhagavata Purana. The Yoga Vasistha became an authoritative source text in the Advaita vedanta tradition in the 14th century, while Vidyāraņya's Jivanmuktiviveka (14th century) was influenced by the (Laghu-)Yoga-Vasistha, which in turn was influenced by Kashmir Shaivism. Vivekananda's 19th century emphasis on nirvikalpa samadhi was preceded by medieval yogic influences on Advaita Vedanta. In the 16th and 17th centuries, some Nath and hatha yoga texts also came within the scope of the developing Advaita Vedanta tradition.

=== Company rule in India and Hindu reform movements ===
==== Company rule in India ====
The influence of the Islamic Mughal Empire on the Indian subcontinent was gradually replaced with that of the East India Company, leading to a new era in Indian history. Prior to the establishment of Company rule, Mughal rule in Northern India had a drastic effect on Hinduism (and Buddhism) through various acts of persecution. While Indian society was greatly impacted by Mughal rule, the Mughal economy however continued to remain one of the largest in the world, thanks in large part to its proto-industrialisation. Muslim rule over Southern India was also relatively short-lived before the 17th century. The policies of the East India Company coincided with the decline of proto-industrialisation in former Mughal territories. The economic decline caused in part by restrictive Company policies in their Indian territories and the Industrial Revolution in Europe led to the eventual dismantlement of the dominant decentralised education systems in India in the tail end of the 18th century. The new education system drafted by the East India Company emphasised Western culture at the expense of Indian cultures. The East India Company was also involved in supporting the activities of Protestant missionaries in India, particularly after 1813. These missionaries frequently expressed anti-Hindu sentiments, in line with their Christian ways of thinking.

==== Hindu reform movements ====
In response to Company rule in India and the dominance of Western culture, Hindu reform movements developed, propagating societal and religious reforms, exemplifying what Percival Spear has called

... the 'solution of synthesis'—the effort to adapt to the newcomers, in the process of which innovation and assimilation gradually occur, alongside an ongoing agenda to preserve the unique values of the many traditions of Hinduism (and other religious traditions as well). (Note: Percival Spear (1958), India, Pakistan and the West, pp 177–91. In : "Spear develops a typology of behavioral responses that appeared among the people of India with the establishment of Company rule in India. This typology is to some degree still relevant for formulating how Indic religion and philosophy may begin to play an innovative role in the intellectual discourses of our time. Spear identifies five types of distinctive responses: 1. a "military" or openly hostile response—taking up arms against the intruders; 2. a "reactionary" response—the attempt to reconstitute the older political order, for example, the North Indian Rebellion (formerly called the "mutiny") in 1857–58; 3. a "westernizing" response—assimilating to the new values; 4. an "orthodox" response—maintenance of the older religion with appropriate reform; and; 5. the "solution of synthesis"—the effort to adapt to the newcomers, in the process of which innovation and assimilation gradually occur, alongside an ongoing agenda to preserve the unique values of the many traditions of Hinduism (and other religious traditions as well).")

Neo-Vedanta, also called "neo-Hinduism" is a central theme in these reform-movements. The earliest of these reform-movements was Ram Mohan Roy's Brahmo Samaj, who strived toward a purified and monotheistic Hinduism.

== Major proponents ==
Neo-Vedanta's main proponents are the leaders of the Brahmo Samaj, especially Ram Mohan Roy is the main proponents of neo-Hinduism.

=== Ram Mohan Roy and the Brahmo Samaj ===
The Brahmo Samaj was the first of the 19th century reform movements. Its founder, Ram Mohan Roy (1772–1833), strived toward a universalistic interpretation of Hinduism. He rejected Hindu mythology, but also the Christian trinity. He found that Unitarianism came closest to true Christianity, and had a strong sympathy for the Unitarians. He founded a missionary committee in Calcutta, and in 1828 asked for support for missionary activities from the American Unitarians. By 1829, Roy had abandoned the Unitarian Committee, but after Roy's death, the Brahmo Samaj kept close ties to the Unitarian Church, who strived towards a rational faith, social reform, and the joining of these two in a renewed religion. The Unitarians were closely connected to the Transcendentalists, who were interested in and influenced by Indian religions early on.

Rammohan Roy's ideas were "altered ... considerably" by Debendranath Tagore, who had a Romantic approach to the development of these new doctrines, and questioned central Hindu beliefs like reincarnation and karma, and rejected the authority of the Vedas. Tagore also brought this "neo-Hinduism" closer in line with Western esotericism, a development which was furthered by Keshubchandra Sen. Sen was influenced by Transcendentalism, an American philosophical-religious movement strongly connected with Unitarianism, which emphasised personal religious experience over mere reasoning and theology. Sen strived to "an accessible, non-renunciatory, everyman type of spirituality", introducing "lay systems of spiritual practice" which can be regarded as prototypes of the kind of Yoga-exercises which Vivekananda populurised in the west.

The theology of the Brahmo Samaj was called "neo-Vedanta" by Christian commentators, who "partly admired [the Brahmos] for their courage in abandoning traditions of polytheism and image worship, but whom they also scorned for having proffered to other Hindus a viable alternative to conversion". Critics accused classical Vedanta of being "cosmic self-infatuation" and "ethical nihilism". Brahmo Samaj leaders responded to such attacks by redefining the Hindu path to liberation, making the Hindu path available to both genders and all castes, incorporating "notions of democracy and worldly improvement".

=== Vivekananda (1863–1902) ===
According to Gavin Flood, Vivekananda (1863–1902) (Narendranath Dutta) "is a figure of great importance in the development of a modern Hindu self-understanding and in formulating the West's view of Hinduism". He played a major role in the revival of Hinduism, and the spread of Advaita Vedanta to the west via the Ramakrishna Mission. (Note: His interpretation of Advaita Vedanta has been called "Neo-Vedanta".)

In 1880 Vivekananda joined Keshub Chandra Sen's Nava Vidhan, which was established by Sen after meeting Ramakrishna and reconverting from Christianity to Hinduism. Narendranath (a.k.a. Narendra) became a member of a Freemasonry lodge "at some point before 1884" and of the Sadharan Brahmo Samaj in his twenties, a breakaway faction of the Brahmo Samaj led by Keshub Chandra Sen and Debendranath Tagore. From 1881 to 1884 he was also active in Sen's Band of Hope, which tried to discourage the youth from smoking and drinking. It was in this cultic milieu that Narendra became acquainted with Western esotericism. His initial beliefs were shaped by Brahmo concepts, which included belief in a formless God and the deprecation of idolatry, and a "streamlined, rationalised, monotheistic theology strongly coloured by a selective and modernistic reading of the Upanisads and of the Vedanta". He propagated the idea that "the divine, the absolute, exists within all human beings regardless of social status", and that "seeing the divine as the essence of others will promote love and social harmony".

During this period, he came in contact with Ramakrishna, who eventually became his guru. Maharaj has argued that Ramakrishna gradually brought Narendra to a Vedanta-based worldview that "provides the ontological basis for 'śivajñāne jīver sevā', the spiritual practice of serving human beings as actual manifestations of God." Maharaj describes how, "on one occasion in 1884, Sri Ramakrishna was explaining... that one of the main religious practices of Vaiṣṇavas is 'showing compassion to all beings' (sarva jīve dayā)", and that Ramakrishna then asserted "It must not be compassion, but service to all. Serve them, knowing that they are all manifestations of God [śivajñāne jīver sevā]". According to Maharaj, Ramakrishna teachings that day "affected the young Naren so deeply that he took his friends aside afterward and explained its profound ethical significance to them", stating

What Ṭhākur [Sri Ramakrishna] said today in his ecstatic mood is clear: One can bring Vedānta from the forest to the home and practice it in daily life. Let people continue with whatever they are doing; there’s no harm in this. People must first fully believe and be convinced that God has manifested Himself before them as the world and its creatures.... If people consider everyone to be God, how can they consider themselves to be superior to others and harbor attachment, hatred, arrogance—or even compassion [dayā]—toward them? Their minds will become pure as they serve all beings as God [śivajñāne jīver sevā], and soon they will experience themselves as parts of the blissful God. They will realize that their true nature is pure, illumined, and free. (Saradananda 2003: 852, Sāradānanda [1919] 2009: II.ii.131)

Vivekananda popularised the notion of involution, a term which he probably took from western Theosophists, notably Helena Blavatsky, in addition to Darwin's notion of evolution, and possibly referring to the Samkhya term sātkarya. (Note: Theosophic ideas on involution has "much in common" with "theories of the descent of God in Gnosticism, Kabbalah, and other esoteric schools.") According to Meera Nanda, "Vivekananda uses the word involution exactly how it appears in Theosophy: the descent, or the involvement, of divine cosnciousness into matter." With spirit, Vivekananda refers to prana or purusha, derived ("with some original twists") from Samkhya and classical yoga as presented by Patanjali in the Yoga Sutras.

Vivekananda's acquaintance with Western esotericism made him very successful in Western esoteric circles, beginning with his speech in 1893 at the Parliament of Religions. Vivekananda adapted traditional Hindu ideas and religiosity to suit the needs and understandings of his Western audiences, who were especially attracted by and familiar with Western esoteric traditions and movements like Transcendentalism and New thought. An important element in his adaptation of Hindu religiosity was the introduction of his four yoga's model, which includes Raja yoga, his interpretation of Patanjali's Yoga Sutras, which offered a practical means to realise the divine force within which is central to modern Western esotericism. In 1896 his book Raja Yoga was published, which became an instant success and was highly influential in the Western understanding of yoga.

In line with Advaita Vedanta texts like Dŗg-Dŗśya-Viveka (14th century) and Vedantasara (of Sadananda) (15th century), Vivekananda saw samadhi as a means to attain liberation.

=== Gandhi ===
Mohandas K. Gandhi (1869–1948) has become a worldwide hero of tolerance, nonviolence, and striving toward freedom. In his own time, he objected to the growing forces of Indian nationalism, communalism and the subaltern response. (Note: "Subaltern" is the social group who is socially, politically, and geographically outside of the hegemonic power structure of a country. In the Indian colonial and post-colonial context this entails the hegemony of upper-class visions on Indian history, such as the Vedic origins of Hinduism, and the alternative visions such as Dravidian nationalism and the Dalit Buddhist movement.) Gandhi saw religion as a uniting force, confessing the equality of all religions. He synthesised the Astika, Nastika and Semitic religions, promoting an inclusive culture for peaceful living. Gandhi pled for a new hermeneutics of Indian scriptures and philosophy, observing that "there are ample religious literature both in Astika and Nastika religions supporting for a pluralistic approach to religious and cultural diversity".

The orthodox Advaita Vedanta, and the heterodox Jain concept Anekantavada provided him concepts for an "integral approach to religious pluralism". He regarded Advaita as a universal religion ("dharma") which could unite both the orthodox and nationalistic religious interpretations, as the subaltern alternatives. Hereby Gandhi offers an interpretation of Hindutva which is basically different from the Sangh Parivar-interpretation. The concept of anekantavada offered Gandhi an axiom that "truth is many-sided and relative". It is "a methodology to counter exclusivism or absolutism propounded by many religious interpretations". It has the capability of synthesising different percpetions of reality. In Gandhi's view,

...the spirit of 'Synthesis' essentially dominated Indian civilization. This spirit is absorption, assimilation, co-existence and synthesis.

Anekantavada also gives room to an organic understanding of "spatio-temporal process", that is, the daily world and its continued change. (Note: Compare Gier (2012), who pleads for a process-philosophy instead of a substance-philosophy.) The doctrine of anekantavada is a plea for samvada, "dialogue", and an objection against proselytising activities.

=== Sarvepalli Radhakrisnan ===
Sarvepalli Radhakrishnan was a major force in the further popularisation of Neo-Vedanta. As a schoolboy, Sarvepalli Radhakrishnan was inspired by Vivekananda's lectures, in which he found "an ennobling vision of truth and harmony as well as a message of Indian pride". He was educated by Christian missionaries, and wrote a master thesis on Vedanta and ethics. In later life, he became vice-president and president of India. According to Rinehart, he presented his view of Hinduism as the view of Hinduism. Central in his presentation was the claim that religion is fundamentally a kind of experience, anubhava, (Note: Michael Hawley, Internet Encyclopedia of Philosophy, Sarvepalli Radhakrishnan) reducing religion "to the core experience of reality in its fundamental unity". (Note: The notion of "religious experience" can be traced back to William James, who used the term "religious experience" in his book, The Varieties of Religious Experience. Wayne Proudfoot traces the roots of the notion of "religious experience" further back to the German theologian Friedrich Schleiermacher (1768–1834), who argued that religion is based on a feeling of the infinite. The notion of "religious experience" was used by Schleiermacher to defend religion against the growing scientific and secular citique. The term was popularised by the Transcendentalists, and exported to Asia via missionaries. It was adopted by many scholars of religion, of which William James was the most influential.) For Radhakrishnan, Vedanta was the essence and bedrock of religion.

== Philosophy ==
=== Politics ===
==== Nationalism ====
Vivekananda "occupies a very important place" in the development of Indian nationalism (Note: The theory of nationalism by Swami Vivekananda, The New Indian Express, 16 November 2013 (first published in Vedanta Kesari, Ramakrishna Math, Chennai).) as well as Hindu nationalism, and has been called "the prophet of nationalism", pleading for a "Hindu regeneration". According to S.N. Sen, his motto "Arise, Awake and do not stop until the goal is reached" had a strong appeal for millions of Indians. According to Bijoy Misra, a private blogger,

In colonial India, "salvation" had been interpreted as being independent from colonial rule. Many Indians credit Swami Vivekananda to have sown the early seeds of nationalism culminating in India's independence.

==== Social activism ====
According to Bijoy Misra, a private blogger,

Spiritual culmination needed awakening of human will and he helped create a band of volunteers to work among the poor, the distressed and the "left outs" in the economic power struggle. This path of pursuing spirituality through service is a part of original concepts of SriKrishna.

=== Religion ===
==== Unity of Hinduism ====
Neo-Vedanta aims to present Hinduism as a "homogenised ideal of Hinduism" with Advaita Vedanta as its central doctrine. It presents

... an imagined "integral unity" that was probably little more than an "imagined" view of the religious life that pertained only to a cultural elite and that empirically speaking had very little reality "on the ground," as it were, throughout the centuries of cultural development in the South Asian region.

Neo-Vedanta was influenced by Oriental scholarship, which portrayed Hinduism as a "single world religion", and denigrated the heterogeneity of Hindu beliefs and practices as 'distortions' of the basic teachings of Vedanta. (Note: The same tendency to prefer an essential core teaching has been prevalent in Western scholarship of Theravada Buddhism, and has also been constructed by D.T. Suzuki in his presentation of Zen-Buddhism to the west.) (Note: David Gordon White notes: "Many Western indologists and historians of religion specializing in Hinduism never leave the unalterable worlds of the scriptures they interpret to investigate the changing real-world contexts out of which those texts emerged". He argues for "an increased emphasis on non-scriptural sources and a focus on regional traditions".)

==== Universalism ====
Following Ramakrishna, neo-Vedanta regards all religions to be equal paths to liberation, but also gives a special place to Hinduism, as the ultimate universal religion. The various religious faiths of the world are regarded to help people to attain God-realisation, the experience of God or the Ultimate. According to some authors, this is expressed in the Rig Veda, "Truth is one; only It is called by different names," The Ramakrishna/Vivekananda movement has these concepts to popular awareness in India and the West. An example is Aldous Huxley's 1945 book, The Perennial Philosophy, in which are gathered quotes from the religions of the world that express, for him, the universality of religion by showing the same fundamental Truths are found in each of the world's religions.

==== Vedanta and (qualified) nondualism ====
While aligning with Advaita Vedanta, neo-Vedanta modifies core tenets of that tradition. According to Benavides, neo-Vedanta is actually closer to Ramanuja's qualified non-dualism than it is to Shankara Advaita Vedanta. Anil Sooklal also notes that Vivekananda's neo-Advaita "reconciles Dvaita or dualism and Advaita or non-dualism". (Note: Sooklalmquoytes Chatterjee: "Sankara's Vedanta is known as Advaita or non-dualism, pure and simple. Hence it is sometimes referred to as Kevala-Advaita or unqualified monism. It may also be called abstract monism in so far as Brahman, the Ultimate Reality, is, according to it, devoid of all qualities and distinctions, nirguna and nirvisesa ... The Neo-Vedanta is also Advaitic inasmuch as it holds that Brahman, the Ultimate Reality, is one without a second, ekamevadvitiyam. But as distinguished from the traditional Advaita of Sankara, it is a synthetic Vedanta which reconciles Dvaita or dualism and Advaita or non-dualism and also other theories of reality. In this sense it may also be called concrete monism in so far as it holds that Brahman is both qualified, saguna, and qualityless, nirguna (Chatterjee, 1963 : 260).") Nicholas F. Gier notes that neo-Vedanta does not regard the world to be illusionary, in contrast to Shankara's Advaita. (Note: Gier: "Ramakrsna, Svami Vivekananda, and Aurobindo (I also include M.K. Gandhi) have been labeled "neo-Vedantists," a philosophy that rejects the Advaitins' claim that the world is illusory. Aurobindo, in his The Life Divine, declares that he has moved from Sankara's "universal illusionism" to his own "universal realism" (2005: 432), defined as metaphysical realism in the European philosophical sense of the term.") (Note: Ramana Maharshi (2000, p. 303-304), April 15, 1937: "Now they say that the world is unreal. Of what degree of unreality is it? Is it like that of a son of a barren mother or a flwer in the sky, mere words without any reference to facts? Whereas the world is a fact and not a mere word. The answer is that it is a superimposition on the one Reality, like the appearance of a snake on a coiled rope seen in dim light. But here too the wrong identity ceases as soon as the friend points out that it is a rope. Whereas in the matter of the world it persists even after it is known to be unreal. How is that? Again the appearance of water in a mirage persists even after the knowledge of the mirage is recognised. So it is with the world. Though knowing it to be unreal, it continues to manifest.")

Radhakrishnan acknowledged the reality and diversity of the world of experience, which he saw as grounded in and supported by the absolute or Brahman. (Note: Neo-Vedanta seems to be closer to Bhedabheda-Vedanta than to Shankara's Advaita Vedanta, with the acknowledgement of the reality of the world. Nicholas F. Gier: "Ramakrsna, Svami Vivekananda, and Aurobindo (I also include M.K. Gandhi) have been labeled "neo-Vedantists," a philosophy that rejects the Advaitins' claim that the world is illusory. Aurobindo, in his The Life Divine, declares that he has moved from Sankara's "universal illusionism" to his own "universal realism" (2005: 432), defined as metaphysical realism in the European philosophical sense of the term.") Radhakrishnan also reinterpreted Shankara's notion of maya. According to Radhakrishnan, maya is not a strict absolute idealism, but "a subjective misperception of the world as ultimately real".

Gandhi endorsed the Jain concept of Anekantavada, the notion that truth and reality are perceived differently from diverse points of view, and that no single point of view is the complete truth. This concept embraces the perspectives of both Vedānta which, according to Jainism, "recognises substances but not process", and Buddhism, which "recognises process but not substance". Jainism, on the other hand, pays equal attention to both substance (dravya) and process (paryaya).

According to Michael Taft, Ramakrishna reconciled the dualism of formless and form. Ramakrishna regarded the Supreme Being to be both Personal and Impersonal, active and inactive. (Note: Ramakrishna: "When I think of the Supreme Being as inactive - neither creating nor preserving nor destroying - I call Him Brahman or Purusha, the Impersonal God. When I think of Him as active - creating, preserving and destroying - I call Him Sakti or Maya or Prakriti, the Personal God. But the distinction between them does not mean a difference. The Personal and Impersonal are the same thing, like milk and its whiteness, the diamond and its lustre, the snake and its wriggling motion. It is impossible to conceive of the one without the other. The Divine Mother and Brahman are one.") According to Sarma, who stands in the tradition of Nisargadatta Maharaj, Advaitavāda means "spiritual non-dualism or absolutism", in which opposites are manifestations of the Absolute, which itself is immanent and transcendent. (Note: Sarma: "All opposites like being and non-being, life and death, good and evil, light and darkness, gods and men, soul and nature are viewed as manifestations of the Absolute which is immanent in the universe and yet transcends it.")

==== Sruti versus "experience" ====
A central concern in Neo-Vedanta is the role of sruti, sacred texts, versus (personal) experience. Classical Advaita Vedanta is centered on the correct understanding of sruti, the sacred texts. Correct understanding of the sruti is a pramana, a means of knowledge to attain liberation. It takes years of preparation and study to accomplish this task, and includes the mastery of Sanskrit, the memorisation of texts, and the meditation over the interpretation of those texts. Understanding is called anubhava, knowledge or understanding derived from (personal) experience. (Note: V.S.Apte, The Practical Sanskrit-English Dictionary) Anubhava removes Avidya, ignorance, regarding Brahman and Atman, and leads to moksha, liberation. In neo-Vedanta, the status of sruti becomes secondary, and "personal experience" itself becomes the primary means to liberation.

== Smarta tradition ==
According to Ninian Smart, Neo-Vedanta is "largely a smarta account." In modern times Smarta-views have been highly influential in both the Indian (Note: iskcon.org, Heart of Hinduism: The Smarta Tradition) and Western understanding of Hinduism. According to iskcon.org,

Many Hindus may not strictly identify themselves as Smartas but, by adhering to Advaita Vedanta as a foundation for non-sectarianism, are indirect followers.

Vaitheespara notes adherence of Smartha Brahmans to "the pan-Indian Sanskrit-Brahmanical tradition":

The emerging pan-Indian nationalism was clearly founded upon a number of cultural movements that, for the most part, reimagined an 'Aryo-centric', neo-Brahmanical vision of India, which provided the 'ideology' for this hegemonic project. In the Tamil region, such a vision and ideology was closely associated with the Tamil Brahmans and, especially, the Smartha Brahmans who were considered the strongest adherents of the pan-Indian Sanskrit-Brahmanical tradition.

The majority of members of Smarta community follow the Advaita Vedanta philosophy of Shankara. Smarta and Advaita have become almost synonymous, though not all Advaitins are Smartas. Shankara was a Smarta, just like Radhakrishnan. Smartas believe in the essential oneness of five (panchadeva) or six (Shanmata) deities as personifications of the Supreme. According to Smartism, supreme reality, Brahman, transcends all of the various forms of personal deity. God is both Saguna and Nirguna:

As Saguna, God exhibits qualities such as an infinite nature and a number of characteristics such as compassion, love, and justice. As Nirguna, God is understood as pure consciousness that is not connected with matter as experienced by humanity. Because of the holistic nature of God, these are simply two forms or names that are expressions of Nirguna Brahman, or the Ultimate Reality.

Lola Williamson further notes that "what is called Vedic in the smarta tradition, and in much of Hinduism, is essentially Tantric in its range of deities and liturgical forms."

== Influence ==
Neo-Vedanta was popularised in the 20th century in both India and the west by Vivekananda, Sarvepalli Radhakrishnan, and Western orientalists who regarded Vedanta to be the "central theology of Hinduism".

=== Vedanticisation ===
Neo-Vedanta has become a broad current in Indian culture, extending far beyond the Dashanami Sampradaya, the Advaita Vedanta Sampradaya founded by Adi Shankara. The influence of Neo-Vedanta on Indian culture has been called "Vedanticisation" by Richard King.

An example of this "Vedanticisation" is Ramana Maharshi, who is regarded as one of the greatest Hindu-saints of modern times, (Note: A comparable change of reception can be seen in the status of Meister Eckhart, who has come to be celebrated the most noted Western mystic.), of whom Sharma notes that "among all the major figures of modern Hinduism [he] is the one person who is widely regarded as a jivanmukti". Although Sharma admits that Ramana was not acquainted with Advaita Vedanta before his personal experience of liberation, and Ramana never received initiation into the Dashanami Sampradaya or any other sampradaya, Sharma nevertheless sees Ramana's answers to questions by devotees as being within an Advaita Vedanta framework. (Note: Ramana himself observed religious practices connected to Tamil Shaivism, such as Pradakshina, walking around the mountain, a practice which was often performed by Ramana. Ramana considered Arunachala to be his Guru. Asked about the special sanctity of Arunachala, Ramana said that Arunachala is Shiva himself.In his later years, Ramana said it was the spiritual power of Arunachala which had brought about his Self-realisation. He composed the Five Hymns to Arunachala as devotional song. In later life, Ramana himself came to be regarded as Dakshinamurthy, an aspect of Shiva as a guru.)

=== Diversity and pluralism ===
In response to the developments in India during the colonial era and Western critiques of Hinduism, various visions on Indian diversity and unity have been developed within the nationalistic and reform movements.

The Brahmo Samaj strived towards monotheism, while no longer regarding the Vedas as sole religious authority. The Brahmo Samaj had a strong influence on the Neo-Vedanta of Vivekananda, Aurobindo, Radhakrishnan and Gandhi, who strived toward a modernised, humanistic Hinduism with an open eye for societal problems and needs. Other groups, like the Arya Samaj, strived toward a revival of Vedic authority. (Note: The Arya Samaj "teaches that the Vedic religion is the only true religion revealed by God for all." The Arya Samaj was founded by Dayanand Saraswati (1824-1883), who "was the solitary champion of Vedic authority and infallibility".) In this context, various responses toward India's diversity developed.

==== Hindu inclusivism – Hindutva and "Dharmic religions" ====
In modern times, the orthodox measure of the primacy of the Vedas has been joined with the 'grand narrative' of the Vedic origins of Hinduism. The exclusion of Jainism and Buddhism excludes a substantial part of India's cultural and religious history from the assertion of a strong and positive Hindu identity. Hindutva-ideology solves this problem by taking recourse to the notion of Hindutva, "Hinduness", which includes Jainism and Buddhism. A recent strategy, exemplified by Rajiv Malhotra, is the use of the term dharma as a common denominator, which also includes Jainism and Buddhism.

According to Larson, Malhotra's notion of "the so-called "Dharma” traditions" and their "integral unity" is another example of "neo-Hindu discourse". Malhotra, in his Being Different, uses the term "Dharmic tradition" or "dharmic systems", "referring to all the Hindu, Buddhist, Jaina and Sikh traditions". He proposes that those traditions, despite their differences, share common features, the most important being "Dharma". (Note: According to Paul Hacker, as described by Halbfass, the term "dharma" "assumed a fundamentally new meaning and function in modern Indian thought, beginning with Bankim Chandra Chatterjee in the nineteenth century. This process, in which dharma was presented as an equivalent of, but also a response to the Western notion of "religion", reflects a fundamental change in the Hindu sense of identity and in the attitude toward other religious and cultural traditions. The foreign tools of "religion" and "nation" became tolls of self-definition, and a new and precarious sense of the "unity of Hinduism" and of national as well as religious identity took root".) They are also characterised by the notion of "Integral Unity", which means that "ultimately only the whole exists; the parts that make up the whole have but a relative existence. The whole is independent and indivisible", as opposed to "Synthetic Unity", which "starts with parts that exist separately from one another". (Note: According to Malhotra, "the four Dharma systems also share these general presuppositions": "They all lead to the transcendent principle expressed variously as brahman, nirvana and kevala"; "They facilitate the attainment of an extraordinary and direct experience (such as the highest yogic samadhi), leading to the realization of the transcendent principle at the personal level (sometimes even at the embodied level as jivanamukta or avalokateçvara); "They facilitate a harmonious relation between the phenomenal and material mode of life (samsara) with the goal of spiritual liberation (paramartha) variously"; "They all share praxis, including symbols, foods, customs, social values, sacred geography, family values, festivals and so on.") Malhotra has received strong criticism of his ideas, for 'glossing over' the differences between and even within the various traditions of India.

In response, Malhotra explains that some of his critics confused "integral unity" with "homogeneity", thinking that Malhotra said all those traditions are essentially the same, when he actually wrote that Dharmic traditions share a sense of an "integral unity" despite differences. (Note: According to Larson, Malhotra would have the reader believe that there is an "integral unity" underlying the various Dharma traditions, but, in fact, the very term "dharma" signals fascinating differences." And according to Yelle, The idea of "dharmic traditions" represents a choice to gloss over, whether for ideological or strategic reasons, the vast differences that exist among and even within the various traditions of India ... These differences are invoked occasionally in order to buttress Malhotra’s argument for the pluralism of Indian culture, only to be erased as he presents as universal to dharmic traditions what is, in fact, easily recognizable as a thoroughly modern and homogenized ideal of Hinduism drawn from certain aspects of Vedanta philosophy and Yoga. In a response, Malhotra explains that some of his critics confused "integral unity" with "homogeneity", and that all those traditions are essentially the same, but that they share the assertion of an "integral unity": Yelle is right when he says that, "Every tradition is in fact an amalgam, and retains the traces of its composite origins." But he is wrong when he argues against my use of common features such as integral unity and embodied knowing, calling these "a thoroughly modern and homogenized ideal of Hinduism drawn from certain aspects of Vedånta philosophy and Yoga." His concern about homogenization would have been legitimate if Being Different had proposed an integration of all Dharma traditions into a single new tradition. This is simply not my goal. Looking for commonality as a standpoint from which to gaze at a different family does not require us to relinquish the internal distinctiveness among the members of either family.)

==== Inclusivism and communalism ====
According to Rinehart, neo-Vedanta is "a theological scheme for subsuming religious difference under the aegis of Vedantic truth". (Note: Though neo-Hindu authors prefer the idiom of tolerance to that of inclusivism, it is clear that what is advocated is less a secular view of toleration than a theological scheme for subsuming religious difference under the aegis of Vedantic truth. Thus Radhakrishnan's view of experience as the core of religious truth effectively leads to harmony only when and if other religions are willing to assume a position under the umbrella of Vedanta. We might even say that the theme of neo-Hindu tolerance provided the Hindu not simply with a means to claiming the right to stand alongside the other world religions, but with a strategy for promoting Hinduism as the ultimate form of religion itself.) According to Rinehart, the consequence of this line of reasoning is Communalism, the idea that "all people belonging to one religion have common economic, social and political interests and these interests are contrary to the interests of those belonging to another religion." Communalism has become a growing force in Indian politics, presenting several threats to India, hindring its nation-building and threatening "the secular, democratic character of the Indian state".

Rinehart notes that Hindu religiosity plays an important role in the nationalist movement, and that "the neo-Hindu discource is the unintended consequence of the initial moves made by thinkers like Rammohan Roy and Vivekananda." But Rinehart also points out that it is

...clear that there isn't a neat line of causation that leads from the philosophies of Rammohan Roy, Vivekananda and Radhakrishnan to the agenda of [...] militant Hindus. (Note: Neither is Radhakrishnan's "use" of religion in the defense of Asian culture and society against colonialism unique for his person, or India in general. The complexities of Asian nationalism are to be seen and understood in the context of colonialism, modernization and nation-building. See, for example, Anagarika Dharmapala, for the role of Theravada Buddhism in Sri Lankese struggle for independence, and D.T. Suzuki, who conjuncted Zen to Japanese nationalism and militarism, in defense against both Western hegemony and the pressure on Japanese Zen during the Meiji Restoration to conform to Shinbutsu Bunri.)

=== Influence on Western spirituality ===
Neo-Vedanta has been influenced by Western ideas, but has also had a reverse influence on Western spirituality. Due to the colonisation of Asia by the Western world, since the late 18th century an exchange of ideas has been taking place between the Western world and Asia, which also influenced Western religiosity. In 1785 appeared the first Western translation of a Sanskrit-text. It marked the growing interest in the Indian culture and languages. The first translation of Upanishads appeared in two parts in 1801 and 1802, which influenced Arthur Schopenhauer, who called them "the consolation of my life". (Note: And called his poodle "Atman".) Early translations also appeared in other European languages.

A major force in the mutual influence of eastern and Western ideas and religiosity was the Theosophical Society. It searched for ancient wisdom in the east, spreading eastern religious ideas in the west. One of its salient features was the belief in "Masters of Wisdom" (Note: See also Ascended Master Teachings), "beings, human or once human, who have transcended the normal frontiers of knowledge, and who make their wisdom available to others". The Theosophical Society also spread western ideas in the east, aiding a modernisation of eastern traditions, and contributing to a growing nationalism in the Asian colonies. (Note: The Theosophical Society had a major influence on Buddhist modernism and Hindu reform movements, and the spread of those modernised versions in the west. The Theosophical Society and the Arya Samaj were united from 1878 to 1882, as the Theosophical Society of the Arya Samaj. Along with H. S. Olcott and Anagarika Dharmapala, Blavatsky was instrumental in the Western transmission and revival of Theravada Buddhism.) Another major influence was Vivekananda, who popularised his modernised interpretation of Advaita Vedanta in the 19th and early 20th century in both India and the west, emphasising anubhava ("personal experience") over scriptural authority.

== Appraisal and criticism ==
=== Appraisal ===
According to Larson, the "solution of synthesis" - as opposed to "westernizing" response which "led to confusion and disorientation for generations of Indian intellectuals" - prevailed in the work of Ram Mohan Roy, Sayyid Ahmed Khan, Rabindranath Tagore, Swami Vivekananda, M. K. Gandhi, Muhammad Iqbal, V. D. Savarkar, Jawaharlal Nehru, "and many others". Spear voices appraisal of this "solution of synthesis", (Note: [S]uch willingness to achieve a synthesis that is neither fearful of the new nor dismissive of the old is 'the ideological secret of modern India'.) (Note: Spear 1958, page 187, in Larson (2012) p. 320.) while G. R. Sharma emphasises the humanism of neo-Vedanta. (Note: Sri Aurobindo, Vivekananda, Rabindranath, Gandhi and Dayananda have presented Neo-Vedannta Philosophy according to contemporary conditions in India and in the context of the development of thought in the West and East. All these philosophers, with minor differences among them, have maintained what can be called integral humanism. This integral humanism is the philosophy of our age. It alone can supply the philosophical framework for the understanding of the problems of our society.)

=== Criticism ===
Vivekenanda's presentation of Advaita Vedanta has been criticised for its misinterpretation of this tradition:

Without calling into question the right of any philosopher to interpret Advaita according to his own understanding of it, [...] the process of Westernization has obscured the core of this school of thought. The basic correlation of renunciation and Bliss has been lost sight of in the attempts to underscore the cognitive structure and the realistic structure which according to Sankaracarya should both belong to, and indeed constitute the realm of māyā.

According to Anantanand Rambachan, Vivekananda emphasised anubhava ("personal experience") over scriptural authority, but in his interpretation of Shankara, deviated from Shankara, who saw knowledge and understanding of the scriptures as the primary means to moksha. According to Comans, the emphasis on samadhi also is not to be found in the Upanishads nor with Shankara. For Shankara, meditation and Nirvikalpa Samadhi are means to gain knowledge of the already existing unity of Brahman and Atman.

In the 21st century, Neo-Vedanta has been criticised by Hindu traditionalists for the influence of "Radical Universalism", arguing that it leads to a "self-defeating philosophical relativism," and has weakened the status and strength of Hinduism. (Note: Frank Morales (February 15, 2013). "Neo-Vedanta: The Problem with Hindu Universalism"(original link) at website "Bharata Bharati" (http://bharatabharati.wordpress.com/) (accessed 8 February 2014).)

== Criticism of neo-Hinduism label ==
=== Criticism of Paul Hacker ===
In the 20th century the German Indologist Paul Hacker used the terms "Neo-Vedanta" and "Neo-Hinduism" polemically, to criticise modern Hindu thinkers. Halbfass regards the terms "Neo-Vedanta" and "Neo-Hinduism" as "useful and legitimate as convenient labels", but has criticised Hacker for use that was "simplistic". Furthermore, he asks,

What is the significance and legitimacy of the "Neo" in expressions like "Neo-Hinduism and "Neo-Vedanta"? Could we speak of "Neo-Christianity" as well? In fact, I have used this term [...] and not all my Christian readers and reviewers were happy about the term.

Halbfass wrote that the adoption of the terms

"Neo-Hinduism" and "Neo-Vedanta" [...] by Western scholars reflects Christian and European claims and perspectives which continue to be an irritant to Indians today. For Hacker, the "Neo" in "Neo-Hinduism" implies a lack of authenticity, an apologetic accommodation to Western ideas, and a hybridization of the tradition. (Note: Halbfass adds that "I have tried [...] to argue that Hacker's radical critique reflects above all a typically Christian and European obsession with the concept of the individual person.")

Bagchee and Adluri argue that German Indology, including Hacker, was merely "a barely disguised form of religious evangelism".

According to Malhotra, an Indian-American Hindu writer, it was Paul Hacker who popularised the term 'neo-Hinduism' in the 1950s, "to refer to the modernisation of Hinduism brought about by many Indian thinkers, the most prominent being Swami Vivekananda." In Malhotra's view, "Hacker charged that 'neo-Hindus', most notably Vivekananda, have disingenuously adopted Western ideas and expressed them using Sanskrit." Malhotra also notes that Hacker was a biased Christian apologist:

What is less known about Hacker is that he was also an unabashed Christian apologist who freely used his academic standing to further the cause of his Christian agenda. He led a parallel life, passionately advocating Christianity while presenting the academic face of being neutral and objective.

According to David Smith, Hacker's belief was that the ethical values of 'neo-Hinduism" came from Western philosophy and Christianity, just in Hindu terms. Hacker also believed that Hinduism began in the 1870s. He saw Bankin Chattopadhyaya, Aurobindo, Gandhi, and Radhakishnan as its most famous proponents.

=== Neglect of inherent development of religions ===
Brian K. Smith notes that "The Neo-Hindu indigenous authorities are often dismissed as 'inauthentic,' their claims to legitimacy compromised by their encounters with modernity", which influenced their worldview and religious positions, but points out that

All religions, at various points in recent history and under varying circumstances, have adopted to the modern world and the accompanying intellectual trends of modernity. 'Hinduism' (or 'Neo-Hinduism') is not unique in this regard either; the Neo-Hindu movement shares many commonalities with developments in other religious traditions around the world over the past several hundred years. The study of religion is the study of traditions in constant change. (Note: Smith expressed concern that "scholars of religion do not exercise their authority to write about religion(s) in a vacuum [...] One of the principal ramifications of the trend in Indology to deny the existence of a unified religion called 'Hinduism' is to delegitimize those in India who, in varying ways, have represented themselves as 'Hindus' and their religion as 'Hinduism.' [...] This kind of indifference to indigenous conceptualizations of self-identity [...] is especially problematic in an age where Western scholars often claim to be concerned to allow the 'natives to speak' and 'assume agency' over representational discourse [...] Denying the legitimacy of any and all 'Hindu' representations of Hinduism can easily crossover into a Neo-Orientalism, whereby indigenous discourse is once again silenced or ignored as the product of a false consciousness delivered to it by outside forces or as simply irrelevant to the authoritative deliberations of Western Indologists.)

According to Madaio, the notion that Vivekananda and other Hindu modernists deviate from orthodox, classical Advaita Vedanta, neglects the fact that considerable developments took place in Indian religious thinking, including Advaita Vedanta.

=== The "myth of Neo-Hinduism" ===
Rajiv Malhotra, in his 2014 book Indra's Net, has stated that there is a "myth of Neo-Hinduism". According to him, there are "eight myths" of Neo-Hinduism such as "colonial Indology's biases were turned into Hinduism" (Myth 2) and "Hinduism was manufactured and did not grow organically" (Myth 3). Malhotra denies that "Vivekananda manufactured Hinduism", or that `neo-Vedanta' suppressed "the traditions of the Indian masses." According to Malhotra, there is "an integrated, unified spiritual substratum in ancient India," and argues that

the branding of contemporary Hinduism as a faux 'neo-Hinduism' is a gross mischaracterization of both traditional and contemporary Hinduism [...] [C]ontemporary Hinduism is a continuation of a dynamic tradition. It is not in any way less authentic or less 'Hindu' than what may be dubbed traditional Hinduism. There are negative connotations to the term 'neo' which imply something artificial, untrue, or unfaithful to the original. Other world religions have undergone similar adaptations in modern times, though there are no such references to 'neo-Christianity' [...] I resist the wide currency being gained for the term 'neo-Hinduism', because this fictional divide between 'neo' and 'original' Hinduism subverts Hinduism.

According to Malhotra, the 'myth of neo-Hinduism' "is used to fragment Hindu society by pitting its spiritual giants against one another and distorting their subtle and deeply intricate viewpoints." Also according to him, "the definition of neo-Hinduism has been contrived and [...] gained authenticity, in part because it suits certain academic and political agendas, and in part because it has been reiterated extensively without adequate critical response."

== See also ==
- Vijnanabhiksu
- Bengali Renaissance
- Hindu reform movements
- Hinduism in the West
- Buddhist modernism
- Islamic modernism
- Zen Narratives

== Sources ==
=== Printed sources ===
- Allen, Michael S. (2 October 2017). "Greater Advaita Vedānta: The Case of Niścaldās". International Journal of Hindu Studies. 21 (3): 275–297. doi:10.1007/s11407-017-9214-0. S2CID 171944554.
- Allen, Michael S.; Venkatkrishnan, Anand (25 September 2017). "Introduction to Special Issue: New Directions in the Study of Advaita Vedānta". International Journal of Hindu Studies. 21 (3): 271–274. doi:10.1007/s11407-017-9218-9.
- Badrinath, Chaturvedi (1 January 2006). Swami Vivekananda, the Living Vedanta. Penguin Books India. ISBN 978-0-14-306209-7. Archived from the original on 3 December 2016.
- Bagchee, Joydeep; Adluri, Vishwa (2013), Miyang Cho, Joanne; Kurlander, Eric; McGetchin, Douglas T. (eds.), The passion of Paul Hacker: Indology, orientalism, and evangelism, New York: Routledge, archived from the original on 17 November 2021
- Banhatti, G.S. (1995), Life and Philosophy of Swami Vivekananda, Atlantic Publishers & Distributors
- Beckerlegge, Gwilym (2006). "Neo-Hinduism". In Clarke, Peter B. (ed.). Encyclopedia of New Religious Movements. London; New York: Routledge. pp. 435–436. ISBN 9-78-0-415-26707-6.
- Benavides, G. (Spring 1993). "Review of "The Emptying God: A Buddhist-Jewish-Christian Conversation. Edited by Cobb John B. Jr., and Ives Christopher. Maryknoll, NY: Orbis, 1990"". Horizons. 20 (1): 194–196. doi:10.1017/S0360966900027341.
- Bhuyan, P. R. (2003), Swami Vivekananda: Messiah of Resurgent India, New Delhi: Atlantic Publishers & Distributors, ISBN 978-81-269-0234-7
- Burch, George Bosworth (1964), "Seven-Valued Logic in Jain Philosophy", International Philosophical Quarterly, 4 (1), Bronx, NY: 68–93, doi:10.5840/ipq19644140, ISSN 0019-0365, archived from the original on 10 December 2011
- Burley, Mikel (2007), Classical Samkhya and Yoga: An Indian Metaphysics of Experience, Taylor & Francis
- Chattopadhyaya, Rajagopal (1999), Swami Vivekananda in India: A Corrective Biography, Motilal Banarsidass Publ., ISBN 978-81-208-1586-5
- Cornille, Catherine (1992), The Guru in Indian Catholicism: Ambiguity Or Opportunity of Inculturation, Wm. B. Eerdmans Publishing
- Comans, Michael (1993), The Question of the Importance of Samadhi in Modern and Classical Advaita Vedanta. In: Philosophy East and West Vol. 43, No. 1 (January 1993), pp. 19-38., archived from the original on 3 June 2017
- Comans, Michael (2000), The Method of Early Advaita Vedānta: A Study of Gauḍapāda, Śaṅkara, Sureśvara, and Padmapāda, Delhi: Motilal Banarsidass
- Dalal, Neil (2009), "Contemplative Practice and Textual Agency in Advaita Vedanta", Method and Theory in the Study of Religion, 21: 15–27, doi:10.1163/157006809X416788
- Dense, Christian D. Von (1999), Philosophers and Religious Leaders, Greenwood Publishing Group
- Dharampal (1971), Collected writings of Dharampal, Other India Press
- Dubois, Joël André-Michel (2014), The Hidden Lives of Brahman: Sankara's Vedanta through His Upanisad Commentaries, in Light of Contemporary Practice, SUNY
- Dundas, Paul (2004), Tara Sethia (ed.), Ahimsā, Anekānta, and Jaininsm, Delhi: Motilal Banarsidass Publ, ISBN 978-81-208-2036-4
- Espín, Orlando O.; Nickoloff, James B. (2007). An Introductory Dictionary of Theology and Religious Studies. Liturgical Press.
- Fields, Rick (1992), How the Swans Came to the Lake. A Narrative History of Buddhism in America, Boston & London: Shambhala
- Flood, Gavin D. (1996), An Introduction to Hinduism, Cambridge University Press
- Fort, Andrew (1998), Jivanmukti in Transformation: Embodied Liberation in Advaita and Neo-Vedanta, State University of New York Press, ISBN 978-0791439043
- Frawley, David (1996), Tantric Yoga and the Wisdom Goddesses: Spiritual Secrets of Ayurveda, Motilal Banarsidass Publ.
- Gier, Nicholas F. (2012), "Overreaching to be different: A critique of Rajiv Malhotra's Being Different", International Journal of Hindu Studies, 16 (3): 259–285, doi:10.1007/s11407-012-9127-x, ISSN 1022-4556, S2CID 144711827
- Gilchrist, Cherry (1996), Theosophy. The Wisdom of the Ages, HarperSanFrancisco
- Godman, David (1985), Be As You Are, Penguin, ISBN 978-0-14-019062-5
- Gombrich, Richard F. (1996), Theravāda Buddhism. A Social History from Ancient Benares to Modern Colombo, London and New York: Routledge
- Halbfass, Wilhelm (1995), Philology and Confrontation: Paul Hacker on Traditional and Modern Vedānta, SUNY Press
- Halbfass, Wilhelm (2007a), "Research and reflection: Responses to my respondents. III. Issues of comparative philosophy (pp. 297-314)", in Franco, Eli; Preisendanz, Karin (eds.), Beyond Orientalism: the work of Wilhelm Halbfass and its impact on Indian and cross-cultural studies (1st Indian ed.), Delhi: Motilal Banarsidass Publishers, ISBN 978-8120831100, archived from the original on 27 September 2015
- Halbfass, Wilhelm (2007b), "Research and reflection: Responses to my respondents. V. Developments and attitudes in Neo-Hinduism; Indian religion, past and present (Responses to Chapters 4 and 5)", in Franco, Eli; Preisendanz, Karin (eds.), Beyond Orientalism: the work of Wilhelm Halbfass and its impact on Indian and cross-cultural studies (1st Indian ed.), Delhi: Motilal Banarsidass Publishers, ISBN 978-8120831100
- Harris, Mark W. (2009), The A to Z of Unitarian Universalism, Scarecrow Press
- Heehs, Peter (2020), "Sri Aurobindo's Theory of Spiritual Evolution", in Mackenzie Brown, C. (ed.), Asian Religious Responses to Darwinism: Evolutionary Theories in Middle Eastern, South Asian, and East Asian Cultural Contexts, Springer Nature
- Hori, Victor Sogen (1999), Translating the Zen Phrase Book. In: Nanzan Bulletin 23 (1999) (PDF), archived (PDF) from the original on 16 January 2020
- Johnson, K. Paul (1994), The masters revealed: Madam Blavatsky and the myth of the Great White Lodge, SUNY Press, ISBN 978-0-7914-2063-8
- King, Richard (1999), Orientalism and Religion: Post-Colonial Theory, India and "The Mystic East", Routledge
- King, Richard (2002), Orientalism and Religion: Post-Colonial Theory, India and "The Mystic East", Routledge
- Kipf, David (1979), The Brahmo Samaj and the shaping of the modern Indian mind, Atlantic Publishers & Distri
- Koller, John (2004), Tara Sethia (ed.), Ahimsā, Anekānta, and Jaininsm, Delhi: Motilal Banarsidass Publ, ISBN 978-81-208-2036-4
- Larson, gerald James (2012), "The Issue of Not Being Different Enough: Some Reflections on Rajiv Malhotra's Being Different" (PDF), International Journal of Hindu Studies, 16 (3): 311–322, doi:10.1007/s11407-012-9129-8, S2CID 144728948, archived (PDF) from the original on 30 April 2014
- Lavoie, Jeffrey D. (2012), The Theosophical Society: The History of a Spiritualist Movement, Universal-Publishers
- Lorenzen, David N. (2006), Who Invented Hinduism: Essays on Religion in History, Yoda Press, ISBN 9788190227261, archived from the original on 2 October 2022
- Madaio, James (2017), "Rethinking Neo-Vedānta: Swami Vivekananda and the Selective Historiography of Advaita Vedānta", Religions, 8 (6): 101, doi:10.3390/rel8060101
- Maddison, Angus (2006), The World Economy - Volume 1: A Millennial Perspective and Volume 2: Historical Statistics, OECD Publishing by Organisation for Economic Co-operation and Development, p. 656, ISBN 9789264022621, archived from the original on 15 October 2014
- Malhotra, Rajiv (2013), "Author's Response: The Question of Dharmic Coherence", International Journal of Hindu Studies, 16 (3): 369–408, doi:10.1007/s11407-012-9132-0
- Malhotra, Rajiv (2014), Indra's Net: Defending Hinduism's Philosophical Unity, HarperCollins Publishers India, ISBN 978-9351362449, OCLC 871215576, archived from the original on 19 March 2014
- McMahan, David L. (2008), The Making of Buddhist Modernism, Oxford University Press, ISBN 9780195183276
- McRae, John (2003), Seeing Through Zen. Encounter, Transformation, and Genealogy in Chinese Chan Buddhism, The University Press Group Ltd, ISBN 9780520237988
- Michaels, Axel (2004), Hinduism. Past and present, Princeton, New Jersey: Princeton University Press
- Michaelson, Jay (2009), Everything Is God: The Radical Path of Nondual Judaism, Shambhala
- Michelis, Elizabeth De (2004), A History of Modern Yoga: Patanjali and Western Esotericism, Continuum, ISBN 978-0-8264-8772-8
- Minor, Robert Neil (1987), Radhakrishnan: A Religious Biography, SUNY Press, ISBN 978-0-88706-554-5
- Mukerji, Mādhava Bithika (1983), Neo-Vedanta and Modernity, Ashutosh Prakashan Sansthan, archived from the original on 13 January 2019
- Myers, Michael (2013), Brahman: A Comparative Theology, Routledge
- Nanda, Meera (2010), "Madame Blavatsky's Children: Modern Hindu Encounters with Darwinism", in Lewis, James R.; Hammer, Olav (eds.), Handbook of Religion and the Authority of Science, BRILL
- Nicholson, Andrew J. (2010), Unifying Hinduism: Philosophy and Identity in Indian Intellectual History, Columbia University Press
- Panicker, P.L. John (2006), Gandhi on Pluralism and Communalism, ISPCK, ISBN 9788172149055, archived from the original on 17 November 2021
- Paranjape, Makarand R. (2009), Another Canon: Indian Texts and Traditions in English, Anthem Press
- Poonja, Sri H. W. L. (2000), The Truth Is, Weiser Books
- Ramana Maharshi (2000). Talks with Ramana Maharshi (PDF). InnerDirections Publishing.
- Rambachan, Anant Anand (1984), The attainment of moksha according to Shankara and Vivekananda with special reference to the significance of scripture (sruti) and experience (anubhabva) (PDF), University of Leeds, archived (PDF) from the original on 20 October 2020
- Rambachan, Anantanand (1991), Accomplishing the Accomplished: The Vedas as a Source of Valid Knowledge in Shankara, University of Hawaii Press
- Rambachan, Anatanand (1994), The Limits of Scripture: Vivekananda's Reinterpretation of the Vedas, University of Hawaii Press
- Renard, Philip (2010), Non-Dualisme. De directe bevrijdingsweg, Cothen: Uitgeverij Juwelenschip
- Rinehart, Robin (2004), Contemporary Hinduism: ritual, culture, and practice, ABC-CLIO
- Sarma, Chandradhar (1996), The Advaita Tradition in Indian Philosophy, Delhi: Motilal Banarsidass
- Sen, S.N (1997), History of the Freedom Movement in India (1857-1947), New Age International
- Sen, Amiya (2006), Indispensable Vivekananda: anthology for our times, Orient Blackswan, ISBN 978-81-7824-130-2
- Sharf, Robert H. (1993), "The Zen of Japanese Nationalism", History of Religions, 33 (1): 1–43, doi:10.1086/463354, S2CID 161535877, archived from the original on 29 December 2020
- Sharf, Robert H. (1995a), Whose Zen? Zen Nationalism Revisited (PDF)
- Sharf, Robert H. (2000), The Rhetoric of Experience and the Study of Religion. In: Journal of Consciousness Studies (PDF), vol. 7, pp. 267–87, archived from the original (PDF) on 13 May 2013
- Sharma, Arvind (2005), "Jivanmukti in Neo-Hinduism: The Case of Ramana Maharshi", Asian Philosophy, 15 (3): 207–220, doi:10.1080/09552360500285276, S2CID 143620507
- Sharma, G.R. (2003), Trends In Contemporary Indian Philosophy Of Education A Critical Evaluation, Atlantic Publishers & Dist
- Sharma, Jyotirmaya (2011), Hindutva: Exploring the Idea of Hindu Nationalism (Third ed.), Penguin Books India, ISBN 9780143418184
- Sharma, Jyotirmaya (2013), A Restatement of Religion: Swami Vivekananda and the Making of Hindu Nationalism, Yale University Press, ISBN 978-0-300-19740-2
- Sinari, Ramakant (2000), Advaita and Contemporary Indian Philosophy. In: Chattopadhyana (gen.ed.), "History of Science, Philosophy and Culture in Indian Civilization. Volume II Part 2: Advaita Vedanta", Delhi: Centre for Studies in Civilizations
- Smart, Ninian (2009), Ninian Smart on World Religions: Traditions and the challenges of modernity. I. Individual traditions. Buddhism. 'Mysticism and scripture in Theravāda Buddhism', Ashgate Publishing, Ltd.
- Smith, Brian K. (December 1998). "Questioning authority: Constructions and deconstructions of Hinduism". International Journal of Hindu Studies. 2 (3): 313–339. doi:10.1007/s11407-998-0001-9. S2CID 144929213.
- Sooklal, Anil (1993), "The Neo-Vedanta Philosophy of Swami Vivekananda" (PDF), Nidan, 5
- Taft, Michael (2014), Nondualism: A Brief History of a Timeless Concept, Cephalopod Rex
- Vaitheespara, Ravi (2010), "Forging a Tamil caste: Maraimalai Adigal (1876-1950) and the discourcse of caste and ritual in colonial Tamilnadu", in Bergunder; et al. (eds.), Ritual, Caste, and Religion in Colonial South India, Otto Harrassowitz Verlag, ISBN 9783447063777, archived from the original on 21 September 2021
- Venkataramiah, Munagala (1936), Talks with Sri Ramana Maharshi, Tiruvannamalai: Sri Ramanasramam
- Versluis, Arthur (1993), American Transcendentalism and Asian Religions, Oxford University Press
- White, David Gordon (2006), "Digging wells while houses burn? Writing histories of Hinduism in a time of identity politics", History and Theory, 45 (4): 104–131, doi:10.1111/j.1468-2303.2006.00387.x
- Williamson, Lola (2010), Transcendent in America: Hindu-inspired Meditation Movements as New Religion, NYU Press
- Yelle, Robert A. (2012), "Comparative Religion as Cultural Combat: Occidentalism and Relativism in Rajiv Malhotra's Being Different", International Journal of Hindu Studies, 16 (3): 335–348, doi:10.1007/s11407-012-9133-z, S2CID 144950049
