= Satori =

Japanese Buddhist term for awakening

Satori (Japanese: 悟り) is a Japanese Buddhist term for "awakening", "comprehension; understanding". The word derives from the Japanese verb satoru. In the Zen Buddhist tradition, satori refers to a deep experience of kenshō, "seeing into one's true nature". Ken means "seeing," shō means "nature" or "essence". Satori and kenshō are commonly translated as "enlightenment", a word that is also used to translate bodhi, prajñā, and Buddhahood.

== Definition ==
Satori means the experience of awakening ("enlightenment") or apprehension of the true nature of reality. It is often considered an experience which cannot be expressed in words. While the term satori is derived from the Japanese verb "to know" (satoru), it is distinct from the philosophical concept of knowledge as it represents a transcendence of the distinction between one that knows and knowledge.

D. T. Suzuki, a Japanese author of books and essays on Buddhism, Zen and Shin that were influential in the West, described "... looking into one's nature or the opening of satori"; and said "This acquiring of a new point of view in our dealings with life and the world is popularly called by Japanese Zen students 'satori' (wu in Chinese). It is really another name for Enlightenment (Anuttarā-samyak-saṃbodhi)". (Note: D. T. Suzuki has been criticised for his highly idealised and inaccurate picture of Japanese Zen. Anuttara-samyak-saṃbodhi is the highest state of realisation and awakening. Satori, or kenshō, is the first glimpse into "nature", to be followed by further training.)

== Satori and kenshō ==
Japanese characters for satori

Satori is often used interchangeably with kenshō. Kenshō refers to the perception of the Buddha-nature or emptiness. While the terms have the same meaning, customarily satori is used to refer to full, deep experience of enlightenment (such as of the Buddha), while kenshō is used to refer to a first experience of enlightenment that can still be expanded.

Distinct from this first insight, daigo-tettei is used to refer to a "deep" or lasting realization of the nature of existence.

== Importance ==
According to D. T. Suzuki,

Satori is the raison d'être of Zen, without which Zen is not Zen. Therefore every contrivance, disciplinary and doctrinal, is directed towards satori.

This view is typical of Rinzai, which emphasizes satori. The Sōtō school rejects this emphasis, and instead emphasizes "silent illumination" through the practice of zazen.

== Realizing satori ==
In Japanese Buddhism, satori is a "first step" or embarkation toward Buddhahood:

Ch'an expressions refer to enlightenment as "seeing your self-nature". But even this is not enough. After seeing your self-nature, you need to deepen your experience even further and bring it into maturation. You should have enlightenment experiences again and again and support them with continuous practice. Even though Ch'an says that at the time of enlightenment, your outlook is the same as of the Buddha, you are not yet a full Buddha.

The student's mind must be prepared by rigorous study, with the use of koans, and the practice of meditation to concentrate the mind, under the guidance of a teacher. Koans are short anecdotes of verbal exchanges between teachers and students, typically of the Song dynasty, dealing with Buddhist teachings. The Rinzai school utilizes classic collections of koans such as The Gateless Barrier. The Gateless Barrier was assembled by the early 13th-century Chinese Zen master Wumen Huikai.

Wumen struggled for six years with koan "Zhaozhou's dog", assigned to him by Yuelin Shiguan (月林師觀; Japanese: Gatsurin Shikan) (1143–1217), before attaining kenshō. After his understanding had been confirmed by Yuelin, Wumen wrote the following enlightenment poem:

A thunderclap under the clear blue sky
All beings on earth open their eyes;
Everything under heaven bows together;
Mount Sumeru leaps up and dances.

== See also ==
- Catharsis
- Epiphany
- Gnosis
- Grok
- Peak experience
- Samadhi
- Satori generation
- Shiken haramitsu daikoumyo
- Sotāpanna or Stream Entry
- Ten Bulls

== Sources ==
- Kapleau, Philip (1989). The Three Pillars of Zen: Teaching, Practice, and Enlightenment. New York: Anchor Books. ISBN 978-0-385-26093-0.
- McRae, John R. (2003). Seeing Through Zen: Encounter, Transformation, and Genealogy in Chinese Chan Buddhism. The University Press Group Ltd. ISBN 978-0-520-23798-8.
- Suzuki, D. T. (1994a) [1934]. An Introduction to Zen Buddhism. Grove Press. ISBN 978-0-8021-3055-6.
- Suzuki, D. T. (1994b). Essays in Zen Buddhism. Grove Press. ISBN 978-0-8021-5118-6.
- Sheng Yen (2006). Dharma Drum: The Life and Heart of Chan Practice. Boston & London: Shambhala. ISBN 978-1-59030-396-2.
