= TZN (disambiguation) =

TZN most commonly refers to Tiziano Ferro, an Italian singer and songwriter.

TZN and tzn may also refer to:

- South Andros Airport, Bahamas (IATA code TZN)
- Traditional Zen Narrative, one of the three main narratives concerning Zen Buddhism.
- Wetarese language, an Austronesian language spoken in Indonesia (ISO 639-3 code tzn)
