= Myokonin =

The Myokonin (妙好人, myōkōnin) are pious followers of the Jōdo Shinshū and Jōdo-shū sects of Japanese Buddhism.

Myōkōnin, which means "a wondrous, excellent person", refers to a devout follower of Pure Land Buddhism who lives a life of total dedication to Amida, the Buddha of the Western Pure Land, and whose acts and sayings, though they may often run counter to common sense, reveal the depth of faith and true humanity.

Myōkōnin were largely unheard of in the West until D. T. Suzuki introduced them in his lectures and writings on Jōdo Shinshū. Most myōkōnin left few, if any, written records, but one of them, Saichi, is noted for his numerous poems expressing his devotion to Amida Buddha.

Myōkōnin have been documented from the Tokugawa period to modern times.
