= Shiken haramitsu daikoumyo =

Shiken haramitsu daikoumyo is a nine-syllable Japanese Buddhist mantra. Its kanji is 四拳 波羅蜜 大光明:

- shi-kin 詞韻: (shi "words")-(kin "tone")
- ha-ra-mitsu 波羅蜜: (ha-ra-mitsu" from Sanskrit "pāramitā" or "perfect)
- dai-kou-myo 大光明: (dai "great")-(kou "light")-(myo "bright")

Shikin is best thought of as a tone or reverberation that is in harmony with nature, and thus all things. It is similar, though perhaps not exactly the same as "Om (Aum)" that is uttered in some meditative practices. Hatsumi-sensei once explained that when thinking of this portion, we must remember that mankind is a part of nature and problems occur when we try to live outside of nature or put ourselves above it. In other words, when we go against the natural flow and rhythm of things, calamity strikes. Therefore, "shikin" can be thought of as being in harmony with nature and the universe.

Haramitsu means pāramitā, or the Buddha's satori: reaching Buddhahood despite worldly distractions. 波 are waves; kanojyo wa nami ga aru ("she has waves in her mind") implies that a person is unstable from worry and confusion. 羅 is gauze, which metaphorically clouds the mind. 蜜 is the nectar of enlightenment. 大光明 (daikoumyo) is a great, bright light; 光明 literally means "a bright future" (hope). According to ninjutsu as taught by Masaaki Hatsumi, there are lessons to be learned from everything—good or bad.
