= An Introduction to Zen Buddhism =

1934 book by D. T. Suzuki

- Cover to 1991 Grove Press edition
- Author: D.T. Suzuki
- Subject: Zen Buddhism
- Publisher: 1934 (Eastern Buddhist Society)
- Publication place: Japan
- Media type: Print
- Pages: 130
- ISBN: 0-8021-3055-0 (1991 edition)
- OCLC: 23975828
- Dewey Decimal: 294.3/927 20
- LC Class: BQ9265.4 .S95 1991

An Introduction to Zen Buddhism is a 1934 book about Zen Buddhism by Daisetz Teitaro Suzuki. First published in Kyoto by the Eastern Buddhist Society, it was soon published in other nations and languages, with an added preface by Carl Jung. The book has come to be regarded as "one of the most influential books on Zen in the West".

== Overview ==
The book grew out of Suzuki's 1914 publications for the Japanese journal New East. Although the editor, Robertson Scott, suggested that Suzuki publish them in book form, he did not decide to do so until after the 1927 publication of his book Zen Essays, which he decided would be "too heavy" as an introduction to Zen for beginners. Suzuki intended the resultant volume, 1934's An Introduction to Zen Buddhism, to be used as a companion with the contemporaneously published Manual of Zen Buddhism.

== Release details ==
An Introduction to Zen Buddhism was published in 1934 in Kyoto by the Eastern Buddhist Society. The Marshall Jones Company of Boston oversaw first publication in the United States. The 1939 German language edition was published with a preface by Carl Jung. In 1949, the book was reprinted in London and New York with Jung's preface, translated by Constance Rolfe, included.
