= D. T. Suzuki =

Japanese Zen scholar (1870–1966)

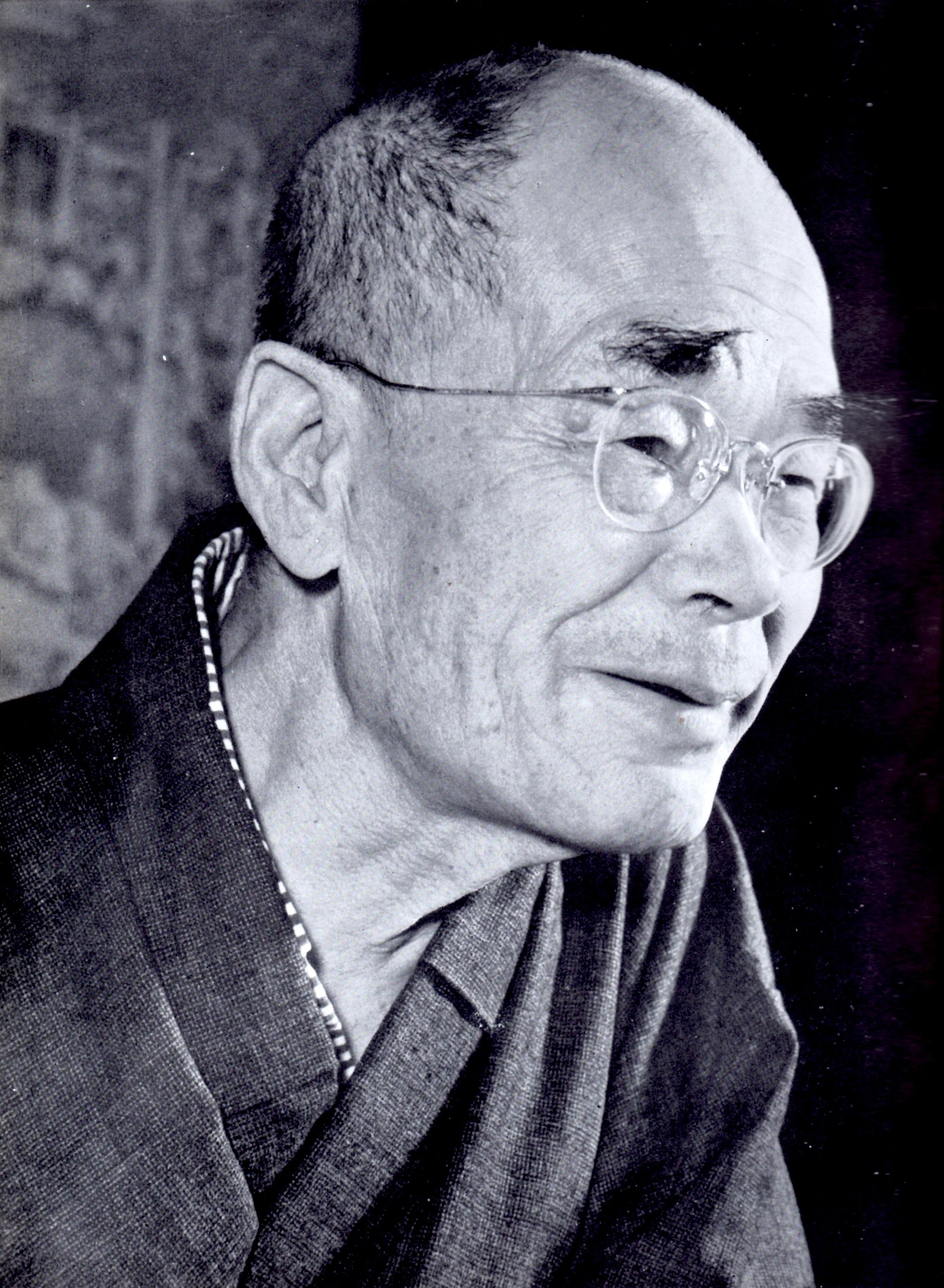
- Photo, c. 1953
- Born: Daisetsu Teitaro Suzuki; 18 October 1870; Honda-machi, Kanazawa, Japan
- Died: 12 July 1966 (aged 95); Kamakura, Japan
- Occupations: University professor, essayist, philosopher, religious scholar, translator, writer
- Writing career
- Notable awards: National Medal of Culture
- Movements: Zen Buddhism; Kyoto School

Daisetz (Note: The standard romanisation of 大拙 is Daisetsu. Suzuki used Daisetz during his lifetime.) Teitaro Suzuki (鈴木 大拙 貞太郎, Suzuki Daisetsu Teitarō; 18 October 1870 – 12 July 1966), was a Japanese essayist, philosopher, religious scholar, and translator. He was an authority on Buddhism, especially Zen and Shin, and was instrumental in spreading interest in these (and in Far Eastern philosophy in general) to the West. He was also a prolific translator of Chinese, Korean, Japanese, Vietnamese and Sanskrit literature. Suzuki spent several lengthy stretches teaching or lecturing at Western universities and devoted many years to a professorship at Ōtani University, a Japanese university of the Ōtani School of Jōdo Shinshū.

Suzuki was nominated for the Nobel Peace Prize in 1963.

== Biography ==
=== Early life ===
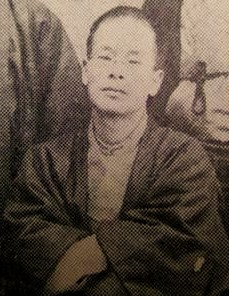
His student days

D. T. Suzuki was born Teitarō Suzuki in Honda-machi, Kanazawa, Ishikawa Prefecture, the fourth son of physician Ryojun Suzuki. The Buddhist name Daisetsu, meaning "Great Humility", the kanji of which can also mean "Greatly Clumsy", was given to him by his Zen master Soyen Shaku. Although his birthplace no longer exists, a humble monument marks its location (a tree with a rock at its base). The samurai class into which Suzuki was born declined with the fall of feudalism, which forced Suzuki's mother, a Jōdo Shinshū Buddhist, to raise him in impoverished circumstances after his father died. When he became old enough to reflect on his fate in being born into this situation, he began to look for answers in various forms of religion. His naturally sharp and philosophical intellect found difficulty in accepting some of the cosmologies to which he was exposed.

=== Education ===
Suzuki studied at Waseda University and University of Tokyo. He set about acquiring knowledge of Chinese, Sanskrit, Pali, and several European languages. During his student years at Tokyo University, Suzuki took up Zen practice at Engaku-ji in Kamakura.

Suzuki lived and studied several years with the scholar Paul Carus. Suzuki was introduced to Carus by Soyen Shaku, who met him at the World Parliament of Religions held in Chicago in 1893. Carus, who had set up residence in LaSalle, Illinois, approached Shaku to request his help in translating and preparing Eastern spiritual literature for publication in the West. Shaku instead recommended his student Suzuki for the job. Suzuki lived at Carus's home, the Hegeler Carus Mansion, and worked with him, initially in translating the classic Tao Te Ching from ancient Chinese. In Illinois, Suzuki began his early work Outlines of Mahayana Buddhism.

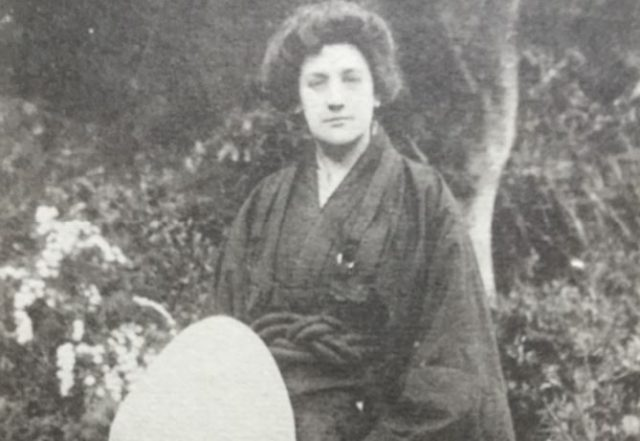
Beatrice Erskine Lane (1878–1939)

Carus himself had written a book offering an insight into, and overview of, Buddhism, titled The Gospel of Buddha. Soyen Shaku wrote the introduction, and Suzuki translated the book into Japanese. At this time, around the turn of the century, quite a number of Westerners and Asians (Carus, Shaku, and Suzuki included) were involved in the worldwide Buddhist revival that had begun slowly in the 1880s.

=== Marriage ===
In 1911, Suzuki married Beatrice Erskine Lane Suzuki, a Radcliffe graduate and theosophist with multiple contacts with the Baháʼí Faith both in America and in Japan. Later Suzuki himself joined the Theosophical Society Adyar and was an active theosophist. Beatrice died in 1939.

=== Late life in America ===
Although Suzuki was already 79 years old in 1949, he accepted an invitation to lecture at Columbia University in that year, and his fame in the United States began to spread. From 1952 to 1957 he was a frequent lecturer at Columbia, at one point rising to the position of adjunct professor. His frequent travel at his advanced age was assisted by a young Japanese-American Columbia student, Mihoko Okamura (1935–2023), who approached him after a 1952 lecture and offered to serve as his secretary. In 1957 he was profiled in Vogue, Time, and The New Yorker, propelling him to national fame in the United States. This was followed in 1958 by a long-form article about Zen in Mademoiselle, several academic publications on Zen to which Suzuki was invited to contribute, and the publication of the novel The Dharma Bums, which immortalized the appropriation of Zen by Jack Kerouac, Gary Snyder and other members of the Beat Generation.

Suzuki retired in 1960 but continued to write about Zen until his death in Japan in 1966. He was attended on his deathbed by Mihoko Okamura.

== Career ==
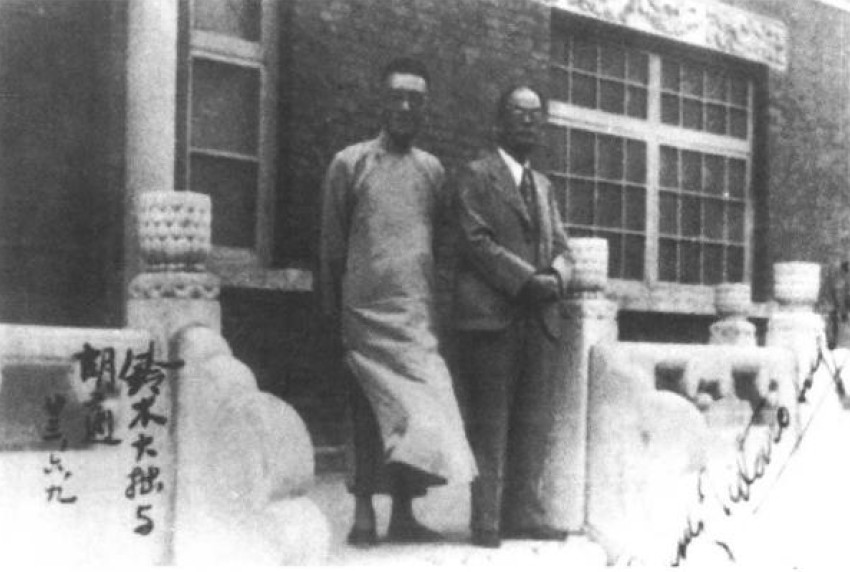
Hu Shih and DT Suzuki during his visit to China in 1934

=== Professor of Buddhist philosophies ===
Besides living in the United States, Suzuki traveled through Europe before taking up a professorship back in Japan. In 1909, Suzuki became an assistant professor at Gakushuin University and at the Tokyo University. Suzuki and his wife dedicated themselves to spreading an understanding of Mahayana Buddhism. Until 1919 they lived in a cottage on the Engaku-ji grounds, then moved to Kyoto, where Suzuki began professorship at Ōtani University in 1921. While he was in Kyoto, he visited Hoseki Shin'ichi Hisamatsu, a Zen Buddhist scholar, and they discussed Zen Buddhism together at Shunkō-in temple in the Myōshin-ji temple complex.

In 1921, the year he joined Ōtani University, he and his wife founded the Eastern Buddhist Society. The Society is focused on Mahayana Buddhism and offers lectures and seminars, and publishes a scholarly journal, The Eastern Buddhist. Suzuki maintained connections in the West and, for instance, delivered a paper at the World Congress of Faiths in 1936, at the University of London (he was an exchange professor during this year).

Besides teaching about Zen practice and the history of Zen (Chan) Buddhism, Suzuki was an expert scholar on the related philosophy called, in Japanese, Kegon, which he thought of as the intellectual explication of Zen experience.

Suzuki received numerous honors, including Japan's National Medal of Culture.

=== Studies ===
A professor of Buddhist philosophy in the middle decades of the 20th century, Suzuki wrote introductions and overall examinations of Buddhism, and particularly of the Zen school. He went on a lecture tour of American universities in 1951, and taught at Columbia University from 1952 to 1957.

Suzuki was especially interested in the formative centuries of this Buddhist tradition in China. A lot of Suzuki's writings in English concern themselves with translations and discussions of bits of the Chan texts the Biyan Lu (Blue Cliff Record) and the Wumenguan (Mumonkan/Gateless Passage), which record the teaching styles and words of the classical Chinese masters. He was also interested in how this tradition, once imported into Japan, had influenced Japanese character and history, and wrote about it in English in Zen and Japanese Culture. Suzuki's reputation was secured in England prior to the US.

In addition to his popularly oriented works, Suzuki wrote a translation of the Lankavatara Sutra and a commentary on its Sanskrit terminology. He looked in on the efforts of Saburō Hasegawa, Judith Tyberg, Alan Watts and the others who worked in the California Academy of Asian Studies (now known as the California Institute of Integral Studies), in San Francisco in the 1950s. In his later years, he began to explore the Jōdo Shinshū faith of his mother's upbringing, and gave guest lectures on Jōdo Shinshū Buddhism at the Buddhist Churches of America.

Suzuki produced an incomplete English translation of the Kyogyoshinsho, the magnum opus of Shinran, founder of the Jōdo Shinshū school. He is quoted as saying that Jōdo Shinshū Buddhism is the "most remarkable development of Mahayana Buddhism ever achieved in East Asia". Suzuki also took an interest in Christian mysticism and in some of the most significant mystics of the West, for example, Meister Eckhart, whom he compared with the Jōdo Shinshū followers called Myokonin. Suzuki was among the first to bring research on the Myokonin to audiences outside Japan as well.

Other works include Essays in Zen Buddhism (three volumes), Studies in Zen Buddhism, and Manual of Zen Buddhism. American philosopher William Barrett compiled many of Suzuki's articles and essays concerning Zen into a 1956 anthology entitled Zen Buddhism.

=== Scholarly opinions ===
It was Suzuki's contention that a Zen "awakening" was the goal of the tradition's training, but that what distinguished the tradition as it developed through the centuries in China was a way of life radically different from that of Indian Buddhists. In India, the tradition of the holy beggar prevailed, but in China, social circumstances led to the development of a temple-and-training center system in which the abbot and the monks all performed mundane tasks. These included food gardening or farming, carpentry, architecture, housekeeping, administration (or community direction), and the practice of folk medicine. Consequently, the enlightenment sought in Zen had to stand up well to the demands and potential frustrations of everyday life.

Suzuki took an interest in other traditions besides Zen. His book Zen and Japanese Buddhism delved into the history and scope of interest of all the major Japanese Buddhist sects.

== Zen training ==
While studying at Tokyo University Suzuki took up Zen practice at Engaku-ji, one of Kamakura's Five Mountains, first studying with Imakita Kosen Rōshi. After Kosen's 1892 passing, Suzuki continued with Kosen's successor at Engaku-ji, Soyen Shaku.

Under Rōshi Soyen, the first master to teach zen Buddhism in America, Suzuki's studies were essentially internal and non-verbal, including long periods of sitting meditation. The task involved what Suzuki described as four years of mental, physical, moral, and intellectual struggle. During training periods at Engaku-ji, Suzuki lived a monk's life. He described this life and his own experience at Kamakura in his book The Training of the Zen Buddhist Monk. Suzuki characterized the facets of the training as: a life of humility; a life of labor; a life of service; a life of prayer and gratitude; and a life of meditation.

Suzuki was invited by Shaku to visit the United States in the 1890s, and Suzuki acted as English-language translator for a book by Shaku (1906). Though Suzuki had by this point translated some ancient Asian texts into English (e.g. Awakening of Faith in the Mahayana), his role in translating and ghost-writing aspects of Soyen Shaku's book was more the beginning of Suzuki's career as a writer in English.

== Spread of Zen in the West ==
=== Zen-messenger ===
Suzuki spread Zen in the West. Philosopher Charles A. Moore said:

Suzuki in his later years was not just a reporter of Zen, not just an expositor, but a significant contributor to the development of Zen and to its enrichment.

=== Buddhist modernism ===
As Suzuki portrayed it, Zen Buddhism was a highly practical religion whose emphasis on direct experience made it particularly comparable to forms of mysticism that scholars such as William James had emphasized as the fountainhead of all religious sentiment. It is this idea of a common essence that made Suzuki's ideas recognizable to a Western audience.

David McMahan claimed that Western audiences identified with 'Western esotericism concealed', 'disguised' as 'eastern mysticism'. This resemblance is not coincidental, since Suzuki was also influenced by Western esotericism, and even joined the Theosophical Society.

Several scholars have identified Suzuki as a Buddhist modernist.

=== Criticism ===
Suzuki has been criticized for his essentialist approach. As early as 1951, Hu Shih criticized Suzuki for presenting an idealist picture of Zen.

McMahan states:

In his discussion of humanity and nature, Suzuki takes Zen literature out of its social, ritual, and ethical contexts and reframes it in terms of a language of metaphysics derived from German Romantic idealism, English romanticism, and American transcendentalism.

Suzuki's approach has been marked as "incomprehensible":

... D. T. Suzuki, whose most cherished methodology seems to have been to describe some aspect of Zen as beyond ordinary explanation, then offer a suitably incomprehensible story or two by way of illustration. Obviously, Suzuki's approach captured the imaginations of generations of readers. However, while this approach substantiated Suzuki's authority as one with insider access to the profound truths of the tradition, another result was to increase the confusion in reader's minds. To question such accounts was to admit one did not "get it", to distance oneself even further from the goal of achieving what Suzuki termed the "Zen enlightenment experience".

== Shin Buddhism ==
Although Suzuki became widely recognized as an authority on Zen, he was deeply interested in and consistently wrote about Jōdo Shinshū (True Pure Land Buddhism) throughout his life. For two decades, he held a professorship at Ōtani University, affiliated with Higashi Honganji, where he and his wife, Beatrice Lane Suzuki, established The Eastern Buddhist academic journal. This publication featured essays on Shin, Zen, and various Mahayana traditions. Suzuki also had contacts and discussions with Shin Buddhist thinkers at Ōtani University. Between 1949 and 1953 Suzuki published numerous works and lectures on Pure Land Buddhism and Shin.

Suzuki came to see the Shin doctrine of Tariki, (the other power of the Buddha), as a kind of letting go of self. Thus, he saw Shin as being complementary to Zen practice. Since he was an outsider to the Shin tradition, he had unique interpretations of Shin Buddhism which were not beholden to the orthodoxy. His interpretations tended to emphasize religious experience, non-duality, and applications of Shin Buddhist teachings to life in this world instead of focusing on the afterlife in the pure land.

In his book Buddha of Infinite Light (2002), (originally titled, Shin Buddhism) Suzuki declared that, "Of all the developments that Mahayana Buddhism has achieved in East Asia, the most remarkable one is the Shin teaching of Pure Land Buddhism." (p. 22) In this book, he also writes admiringly of the myokonin (Shin Buddhist saints):

The problem of intellection is its inability to deal with ambiguity and contradiction, which take place in life all the time. In spite of such contradictions, the myokonin are thankful and joyful for what they have experienced. When pride is gone, there is humility. And humility is recognition of Other-power. When humility is realized, we have a wonderful feeling of joy. Logically, humility should make one feel quite miserable. Yes, it does. But simultaneously one senses a feeling quite opposite to that of misery. In fact, there is joy and there is happiness.

== Involvement with Japanese nationalism ==
According to Sharf and Victoria, Suzuki was associated with Japanese nationalism and its propagation via the appraisal of Japanese Zen. He has been criticised for defending the Japanese war effort, though Suzuki's thoughts on these have also been placed in the context of western supremacy in the first half of the 20th century, and the reaction against this supremacy in Asian countries.

=== View on Nazism and anti-Semitism ===
Brian Victoria delivered lectures in Germany in 2012 in which he revealed evidence of Suzuki's sympathy for the Nazi regime. Victoria writes,

"D. T. Suzuki left a record of his early view of the Nazi movement that was included in a series of articles published in the Japanese Buddhist newspaper, Chūgai Nippō, on 3, 4, 6, 11 and 13 October 1936." In this Suzuki expresses his agreement with Hitler's policies as explained to him by a relative living in Germany.

"While they don't know much about politics, they have never enjoyed greater peace of mind than they have now. For this alone, they want to cheer Hitler on. This is what my relative told me. It is quite understandable, and I am in agreement with him." He also expresses agreement with Hitler's expulsion of the Jews from Germany.

"Changing the topic to Hitler's expulsion of the Jews, it appears that in this, too, there are a lot of reasons for his actions. While it is a very cruel policy, when looked at from the point of view of the current and future happiness of the entire German people, it may be that, for a time, some sort of extreme action is necessary in order to preserve the nation."

Suzuki expressed sympathy with individual Jews. "As regards individuals, this is truly a regrettable situation."

Suzuki was a friend of Karlfried Graf von Dürckheim. Dürckheim, also a noted expounder of Japanese Zen philosophy in the West, was a committed Nazi and worked for the German Foreign Office in Tokyo during the war. He helped his friend Suzuki introduce Zen Buddhism to the West.

=== New Buddhism ===
At the onset of modernization in the Meiji period, in 1868, when Japan entered the international community, Buddhism was briefly persecuted in Japan as "a corrupt, decadent, anti-social, parasitic, and superstitious creed, inimical to Japan's need for scientific and technological advancement". The Japanese government intended to eradicate the tradition, which was seen as a foreign "other", incapable of fostering the nativist sentiments that would be vital for national, ideological cohesion. In addition to this, industrialization led to the breakdown of the parishioner system that had funded Buddhist monasteries for centuries. However, a group of modern Buddhist leaders emerged to argue for the Buddhist cause. These leaders stood in agreement with the government persecution of Buddhism, accepting the notion of a corrupt Buddhist institution in need of revitalization.

As a response to the modernisation of Japan and the persecution of Buddhism, the shin bukkyo, or "New Buddhism", came into existence. It was led by university-educated intellectuals who had been exposed to a vast body of Western intellectual literature. Advocates of New Buddhism, like Suzuki's teachers Kosen and his successor Soyen Shaku, saw this movement as a defense of Buddhism against government persecution, and also saw it as a way to bring their nation into the modern world as a competitive cultural force.

Scholars such as Robert Sharf, as well as Japanese Zen monk G. Victor Sogen Hori, have argued that the breed of Japanese Zen that was propagated by New Buddhism ideologues, such as Imakita Kosen and Soyen Shaku, was not typical of Japanese Zen during their time, nor is it typical of Japanese Zen now. Its importance lies especially within western Zen:

Suffice it to say that, just as the writings of Suzuki and Hisamatsu are not representative of traditional (i.e., pre-Meiji) Zen exegetics, the style of Zen training most familiar to Western Zen practitioners can be traced to relatively recent and sociologically marginal Japanese lay movements which have neither the sanction nor the respect of the modern Rinzai or Sōtō monastic orthodoxies. Indeed, the one feature shared by virtually all of the figures responsible for the Western interest in Zen is their relatively marginal status within the Japanese Zen establishment. While Suzuki, Nishida, and their intellectual heirs may have shaped the manner in which Westerners have come to think of Zen, the influence of these Japanese intellectuals on the established Zen sects in Japan has been negligible. At this point, it is necessary to affirm that Japanese Zen monasticism is indeed still alive, despite the shrill invectives of some expatriate Zen missionaries who insist that authentic Zen can no longer be found in Japan.

The traditional form of Zen has been greatly altered by the Meiji restoration, but Japanese Zen still flourishes as a monastic tradition. The Zen tradition in Japan, in its customary form, required a great deal of time and discipline from monks that laity would have difficulty finding. Zen monks were often expected to have spent several years in intensive doctrinal study, memorizing sutras and poring over commentaries, before even entering the monastery to undergo kōan practice in sanzen with a Zen master. The fact that Suzuki himself was able to do so (as a layman) was largely the invention of New Buddhism.

=== Japanese nationalism ===
During the Meiji restoration the Nihonjinron philosophy took prevalence. It emphasizes the uniqueness of the Japanese people. This uniqueness has been attributed to many different factors. Suzuki attributed it to Zen. In his view, Zen embodies the ultimate essence of all philosophy and religion. He pictured Zen as a unique expression of Asian spirituality, which was considered to be superior to the western ways of thinking.

Sharf criticizes this uniqueness theory, as propagated by Suzuki:

The nihonjinron cultural exceptionalism polemic in Suzuki's work—the grotesque caricatures of 'East' versus 'West'—is no doubt the most egregiously inane manifestation of his nationalist leanings.

Sharf also doubts the motivations of Suzuki:

One is led to suspect that Suzuki's lifelong effort to bring Buddhist enlightenment to the Occident had become inextricably bound to a studied contempt for the West.

Kemmyō Taira Satō does not agree with this critical assessment of Suzuki:

In cases where Suzuki directly expresses his position on the contemporary political situation—whether in his articles, public talks, or letters to friends (in which he would have had no reason to misrepresent his views)—he is clear and explicit in his distrust of and opposition to State Shinto, rightwing thought, and the other forces that were pushing Japan toward militarism and war, even as he expressed interest in decidedly non-rightist ideologies like socialism. In this Suzuki's standpoint was consistent from the late nineteenth century through to the postwar years. These materials reveal in Suzuki an intellectual independence, a healthy scepticism of political ideology and government propaganda, and a sound appreciation for human rights.

== Praise of Suzuki's work ==
Suzuki's books have been widely read and commented on. One example is An Introduction to Zen Buddhism, which includes a 30-page commentary by analytical psychologist Carl Jung, who wrote of Suzuki:

Suzuki's works on Zen Buddhism are among the best contributions to the knowledge of living Buddhism. We cannot be sufficiently grateful to the author, first for the fact of his having brought Zen closer to Western understanding, and secondly for the manner in which he has achieved this task.

== Bibliography ==
These essays made Zen known in the West for the very first time:

- Essays in Zen Buddhism: First Series (1927), New York: Grove Press.
- Essays in Zen Buddhism: Second Series (1933), New York: Samuel Weiser, Inc. 1953–1971. Edited by Christmas Humphreys.
- Essays in Zen Buddhism: Third Series (1934), York Beach, Maine: Samuel Weiser, Inc. 1953. Edited by Christmas Humphreys.
- Suzuki translated the Lankavatara Sutra from the original Sanskrit. Boulder, CO: Prajña Press, 1978, ISBN 0877737029, first published Routledge Kegan Paul, 1932.

Shortly after, a second series followed:

- An Introduction to Zen Buddhism, Kyoto: Eastern Buddhist Soc. 1934. Republished with foreword by C.G. Jung, London: Rider & Company, 1948. Suzuki calls this an "outline of Zen teaching."
- The Training of the Zen Buddhist Monk, Kyoto: Eastern Buddhist Soc. 1934. New York: University Books, 1959. This work covers a "description of the Meditation Hall and its life".
- Manual of Zen Buddhism, Kyoto: Eastern Buddhist Soc. 1935. London: Rider & Company, 1950, 1956. New York: Random House, 1960 and subsequent editions. A collection of Buddhist sutras, classic texts from the masters, icons and images, including the "Ten Ox-Herding Pictures". Suzuki writes that this work is to "inform the reader of the various literary materials relating to the monastic life...what the Zen monk reads before the Buddha in his daily service, where his thoughts move in his leisure hours, and what objects of worship he has in the different quarters of his institution."

After World War II, a new interpretation:

- The Zen Doctrine of No-Mind, London: Rider & Company, 1949. York Beach, Maine: Red Wheel/Weiser 1972, ISBN 0877281823.
- Living by Zen. London: Rider & Company, 1949.
- Mysticism: Christian and Buddhist: The Eastern and Western Way, Macmillan, 1957. "A study of the qualities Meister Eckhart shares with Zen and Shin Buddhism". Includes translation of myokonin Saichi's poems.
- Zen and Japanese Culture, New York: Pantheon Books, 1959. A classic.
- Zen Buddhism and Psychoanalysis, Erich Fromm, D. T. Suzuki, and De Martino. Approximately one third of this book is a long discussion by Suzuki that gives a Buddhist analysis of the mind, its levels, and the methodology of extending awareness beyond the merely discursive level of thought. In producing this analysis, Suzuki gives a theoretical explanation for many of the swordsmanship teaching stories in Zen and Japanese Culture that otherwise would seem to involve mental telepathy, extrasensory perception, etc.

Miscellaneous:

- An anthology of his work until the mid-1950s: Zen Buddhism: Selected Writings of D. T. Suzuki, Doubleday, New York: 1956. Edited by William Barrett.
- Very early work on a Western mystic-philosopher. Swedenborg: Buddha of the North, West Chester, Pa: Swedenborg Foundation, 1996. Trans. by Andrew Bernstein of Swedenborugu, 1913.
- A Miscellany on the Shin Teaching of Buddhism; Kyōto, Shinshū Ōtaniha, 1949.
- Shin Buddhism; New York, Harper & Row, 1970.
- Gutoku Shaku Shinran, The Kyōgyōshinshō, The Collection of Passages Expounding the True Teaching, Living, Faith, and Realizing of the Pure Land, translated by Daisetz Teitarō Suzuki (ed. by The Eastern Buddhist Society); Kyōto, Shinshū Ōtaniha, 1973.
- Collected Writings on Shin Buddhism (ed. by The Eastern Buddhist Society); Kyōto, Shinshū Ōtaniha, 1973.
- Transcription of talks on Shin Buddhism. Buddha of Infinite Light. Boston: Shambhala Publications, 1998. Edited by Taitetsu Unno.
- 'Tribute; anthology of essays by great thinkers. D. T. Suzuki: A Zen Life Remembered. Wheatherhill, 1986. Reprinted by Shambhala Publications.
- See also the works of Alan Watts, Paul Reps et al.

== See also ==
- Age of Enlightenment
- Buddhism and Theosophy
- Cambridge Buddhist Association
- Japanese Zen
- Timeline of Zen Buddhism in the United States
- Theosophy
- Zen narratives
- Zen Studies Society

== Sources ==
- Abe, Masao, ed. (1995), A Zen Life: D.T. Suzuki Remembered, Weatherhill, ISBN 0834802139
- Algeo, Adele S. (July 2005), "Beatrice Lane Suzuki and Theosophy in Japan", Theosophical History, XI
- Algeo, Adele S. (January–February 2007), "Beatrice Lane Suzuki: An American Theosophist in Japan", Quest, 95 (1): 13–17, archived from the original on 5 March 2016
- Andreasen, Esben (1998). Popular Buddhism in Japan: Shin Buddhist Religion & Culture. University of Hawaii Press. ISBN 0824820282.
- Fields, Rick (1992). How the Swans Came to the Lake: A Narrative History of Buddhism in America. Shambhala Publications. ISBN 0877736316.
- Faure, Bernard (1996), Chan Insights and Oversights: An Epistemological Critique of the Chan Tradition, Princeton University Press
- Hori, Victor Sogen (2005), "Introduction" (PDF), in Dumoulin, Heinrich (ed.), Zen Buddhism: A History. Volume 2: Japan, World Wisdom Books, pp. xiii–xxi, ISBN 978-0941532907
- Hu Shih (January 1953), "Ch'an (Zen) Buddhism in China. Its History and Method", Philosophy East and West, 3 (1): 3–24, doi:10.2307/1397361, JSTOR 1397361
- McMahan, David (2008), The Making of Buddhist Modernism, Oxford: Oxford University Press
- McRae, John (2001), Religion as Revolution in Chinese Historiography: Hu Shih (1891–1962) on Shen-hui (684–758). In: Cahiers d'Extreme-Asie 12: 59–102
- McRae, John (2003), Seeing Through Zen. Encounter, Transformation, and Genealogy in Chinese Chan Buddhism, The University Press Group Ltd, ISBN 978-0520237988
- Sato, Kemmyō Taira (2008), "D. T. Suzuki and the Question of War." (PDF), The Eastern Buddhist, 39 (1): 61–120, archived from the original (PDF) on 25 October 2014
- Sharf, Robert H. (August 1993), "The Zen of Japanese Nationalism", History of Religions, 33 (1): 1–43, doi:10.1086/463354, S2CID 161535877
- Sharf, Robert H. (1995), Whose Zen? Zen Nationalism Revisited (PDF)
- Stirling, Isabel (2006). Zen Pioneer: The Life & Works of Ruth Fuller Sasaki. Shoemaker & Hoard. ISBN 978-1593761103.
- Tweed, Thomas A. (2005), "American Occultism and Japanese Buddhism. Albert J. Edmunds, D. T. Suzuki, and Translocative History" (PDF), Japanese Journal of Religious Studies, 32 (2): 249–281, archived from the original (PDF) on 22 May 2012
- Victoria, Brian Daizen (2006), Zen at war (Second ed.), Lanham e.a.: Rowman & Littlefield Publishers, Inc.
- Victoria, Brian Daizen (2010). "The "Negative Side" of D. T. Suzuki's Relationship to War" (PDF). The Eastern Buddhist. 41 (2): 97–138. Archived from the original (PDF) on 29 November 2014.
