= Wilhelm Halbfass =

German indologist

Wilhelm Halbfass (11 May 1940, in Northeim – 25 May 2000) was a German-born Indologist and philosopher.

== Life ==
Wilhelm Halbfass studied Philosophy, Indology and Classical Philology at the Universities of Vienna and Göttingen and successfully defended his doctoral thesis on Indian Philosophy at Göttingen University in 1967. He was a professor in the departments of Asian and Middle Eastern Studies and South Asia Regional Studies at the University of Pennsylvania from 1982 until his death in 2000. Along with Prof. Ludo Rocher, Prof. Ernest Bender, Prof. George Cardona, and several other Sanskritists, he made the University of Pennsylvania the center of Sanskrit learning in North America.

== Works ==
His works include Indien und Europa, Perspektiven ihrer geistigen Begegnung (1981), English translation, India and Europe: An Essay in Understanding (1988). It is a comprehensive survey of the intellectual encounters between India and Europe from antiquity to the present day. He explores these encounters in terms of what he calls xenology, the various ways in which self and otherness are defined "within a historically complex collision of cultures."
