= Zen narratives =

Narratives concerning Zen Buddhism

Modern scientific research on the history of Zen discerns three main narratives concerning Zen, its history and its teachings: Traditional Zen Narrative (TZN), (Note: Andre van de Braak, ZEN SPIRITUALITY IN A SECULAR AGE. Charles Taylor and Zen Buddhism in the West) Buddhist Modernism (BM), Historical and Cultural Criticism (HCC). An external narrative is Nondualism, which claims Zen to be a token of a universal nondualist essence of religions.

== Traditional Zen Narrative (TZN) ==
The Traditional Zen Narrative developed in phases in China during the Tang dynasty and the beginning of the Song dynasty, from the 7th to 11th century. It became dominant during the Song dynasty, when Chan was the dominant form of Buddhism in China, due to support from the Imperial Court.

Its main phases were the development of the traditional Chan lineage, culminating in the "Transmission of the Lamp"-genre, the encounter dialogue culminating in the kōan collections, and the "climax-paradigm of the Song period", when Chan became the dominant Buddhist school in China.

The Traditional Zen Narrative bases its self-understanding especially on the encounter stories of the well-known teachers of the later Tang-period, such as Mazu Daoyi and Linji Yixuan. This period is seen as the "golden age" of Chan, a "romantic coloring" discarded by McRae:

"...what is being referred to is not some collection of activities and events that actually happened in the 8th through 10th centuries, but instead the retrospective re-creation of those activities and events, the imagined identities of the magical figures of the Tang, within the minds of Song dynasty Chan devotees" [...]"This retrospective quality pervades the Chan tradition. Time and again we find we are dealing, not with what happened at any given point, but with what people thought happened previously."

== Buddhist Modernism (BM) ==
In the 20th century the Traditional Zen Narrative was transformed into a modern narrative, due to the power of the Western colonial forces and the modernisation of Japan, and the popularization in the Western world.

=== Romanticism and transcendentalism ===
As a consequence of the adaptation of Zen to the modern world, and the cross-cultural fertilization of western transcendentalism and esotery and Japanese Zen, a romantic idea of enlightenment as insight into a timeless, transcendent reality has been popularized. This is especially due to the influence of Soyen Shaku and his student D.T. Suzuki, who, though known as a Zen Buddhist, was also influenced by Theosophy. Further popularization was due to the writings of Heinrich Dumoulin. Dumoulin viewed metaphysics as the expression of a transcendent truth, which according to him was expressed by Mahayana Buddhism, but not by the pragmatic analysis of the oldest Buddhism, which emphasizes anatta. This romantic vision fits into Western romantic notions of self-realization and the true self, being regarded as a substantial essence being covered over by social conditioning:

Westerners do have a preconception of what ought to happen in mystical insight and in the attainment of enlightenment. True mystical insight, they will object, is not something that can be imposed from outside by a social system; instead it is a welling up of psychic energy from within, a breakthrough in which the true self erupts through the shell imposed by intellect, self-images, and socialization.

The Traditional Zen Narrative attracted the interest of Beat poets and writers in the 1950s:

What was particularly attractive about Zen, however, was not the rigorous zazen and koan study that Maezumi and others would be teaching a decade later, but rather the unusual discourse and eccentric behaviors of the masters of the "golden age" of Chinese Chán described in the classic literature of Zen.

== Historical and Cultural Criticism (HCC) ==
Contemporary research on Buddhism has shed new light on the history of Chan and Zen.

Since the 1960s the scientific research on Zen has created another narrative of Zen. The "grand saga" of Zen appears not to be an accurate historical documentation, but a skillfully created narrative, meant to lend authority to the Zen school. The consequences of this critical narrative seem hardly to be recognized in the Western world.

=== Enlightenment as timeless transcendence ===
The romantic notion of enlightenment as a timeless insight into a transcendental essence has been thoroughly criticized. According to critics it doesn't contribute to a real insight into Buddhism:

...most of them labour under the old cliché that the goal of Buddhist psychological analysis is to reveal the hidden mysteries in the human mind and thereby facilitate the development of a transcendental state of consciousness beyond the reach of linguistic expression.

=== Charismatic authority ===
The introduction of Zen in the West has been accompanied by problems which seem to be connected to this "grand saga". The teacher scandals which have occurred in Western Zen have been explained as being caused by an overreliance on charismatic authority, and a misinterpretation of the meaning of dharma transmission and the position of a roshi.

In Western Zen dharma transmission is highly esteemed. In the Japanese monastery system dharma transmission is a formal notification that someone is fully qualified to take a leading role in this system. In the US and Europe dharma transmission is linked to the unofficial title roshi, older teacher. In the Western world, roshis have been given the archetypal status of the wise old man, someone who has realized an infallible insight into the true self, and has a perfect personality. In daily life this appears to be an idealized view, given the repeated cases of abuse of power, and financial and sexual misbehaviour.

The dependence on charismatic authority and lack of central authority may also lead to fragmentarisation and "new sects spinning off in several directions."

=== Zen and World War II ===
Japanese Zen organisations supported Japanese nationalism and its endeavours during the Pacific War. This support has been made widely known in the Western world by Brian Victoria in his groundbreaking study Zen at War, though in Japan this was already more common knowledge. D.T. Suzuki too supported these endeavours. This Japanese nationalism, and the Japanese uniqueness was also a reaction to perceived western imperialism during the 19th century.

== Nondualism ==
According to Wolfe, Zen is a token of "nonduality":

The teachings of nonduality have begun to come of age in the West, recognized (at last) as the central essence of Zen, Dzochen, Tao, Vedanta, Sufism, and of Christians such as Meister Eckhart. In particular, the recorded teachings of sages (such as Ramana Maharshi and Sri Nisargadatta Maharaj) have paved the way for a contemporary generation of illuminating speakers and writers.

This nondual consciousness is seen as a common stratum to different religions. Several definitions or meanings are combined in this approach, which makes it possible to recognize various traditions as having the same essence.

== See also ==
- List of Buddhists
- Outline of Buddhism
- Timeline of Buddhism
- Chinese Chan

== Sources ==
=== Books and journals ===
- Abe, Masao (1989), Zen and Western Thought, translator: William R. LeFleur, University of Hawaii Press
- Abe, Masao; Heine, Seteven (1996), Zen and Comparative Studies, University of Hawaii Press
- Aitken, Robert (1994), Foreword to "A Buddhist Bible", Boston, Massachusetts: Beacon Press
- Anderson, Reb (2000), Being Upright: Zen Meditation and the Bodhisattva Precepts, Rodmell Press
- Arokiasamy, Arul M. (2005), Zen: Awakening to Your Original Face, Chennai, India: Thiruvanmiyur
- Batchelor, Martine (2004), The Path Of Compassion: The Bodhisattva Precepts, Rowman Altamira
- Bell, Sandra (2002), Scandals in emerging Western Buddhism. In: Westward Dharma: Buddhism beyond Asia. Pages 230-242 (PDF), Berkeley: University of California Press
- Blyth, R. H. (1966), Zen and Zen Classics, vol. 4, Tokyo: Hokuseido Press
- Bodiford, William M. (1992), Zen in the Art of Funerals: Ritual Salvation in Japanese Buddhism. In: 'History of Religions' 32, no. 2 (1992): 150
- Bodiford, William M. (1993a), Sōtō Zen in Medieval Japan, University of Hawaii Press, ISBN 0-8248-1482-7 – via Internet Archive
- Borup, Jørn (2008), Japanese Rinzai Zen Buddhism: Myōshinji, a Living Religion, Brill
- Brown Holt, Linda (1995), "From India to China: Transformations in Buddhist Philosophy", Qi: The Journal of Traditional Eastern Health & Fitness
- Buswell, Robert E. (1991), The "Short-cut" Approach of K'an-hua Meditation: The Evolution of a Practical Subitism in Chinese Ch'an Buddhism. In: Peter N. Gregory (editor) (1991), Sudden and Gradual. Approaches to Enlightenment in Chinese Thought, Delhi: Motilal Banarsidass Publishers Private Limited
- Buswell, Robert E (1993), Ch'an Hermeneutics: A Korean View. In: Donald S. Lopez, Jr. (ed.)(1993), Buddhist Hermeneutics, Delhi: Motilal Banarsidass
- Chappell, David W. (1993), Hermeneutical Phases in Chinese Buddhism. In: Donald S. Lopez, Jr. (ed.)(1993), Buddhist Hermeneutics, Delhi: Motilal Banarsidass
- Cleary, Thomas (2010), Translator's introduction. The Undying Lamp of Zen. The Testament of Zen Master Torei, Boston & London: Shambhala
- Collins, Randall (2000), The Sociology of Philosophies: A Global Theory of Intellectual Change, Harvard University Press
- The Diamond Sutra. In: A Buddhist Bible, translated by Wai-tao, Boston, Massachusetts: Beacon Press, 1994
- Dumonlin, Heinrich (2000), A History of Zen Buddhism, New Delhi: Munshiram Manoharlal Publishers
- Dumoulin, Heinrich (2005a), Zen Buddhism: A History. Volume 1: India and China, World Wisdom Books, ISBN 978-0-941532-89-1
- Dumoulin, Heinrich (2005b), Zen Buddhism: A History. Volume 2: Japan, World Wisdom Books, ISBN 978-0-941532-90-7
- Faure, Bernard (2000), Visions of Power. Imaging Medieval Japanese Buddhism, Princeton, New Jersey: Princeton University Press
- Ferguson, Andy (2000), Zen's Chinese Heritage, Boston, MA: Wisdom Publications, ISBN 0-86171-163-7
- Ford, James Myoun (n.d.), A Note On Dharma Transmission And The Institutions Of Zen
- Foulk, T. Griffith (n.d.), History of the Soto Zen School
- Fowler, Merv (2005), Zen Buddhism: Beliefs and Practices, Sussex Academic Press, ISBN 978-190221042-1
- Gimello, Robert M. (1994), Marga and Culture: Learning, Letters, and Liberation in Northern Sung Ch'an. In: Buswell & Gimello (editors)(1994), Paths to Liberation. Pages 475-505, Delhi: Motilal Banarsidass Publishers
- Goddard, Dwight (2007), History of Ch'an Buddhism previous to the times of Hui-neng (Wie-lang). In: A Buddhist Bible, Forgotten Books, ISBN 978-160506104-7
- Gregory, Peter N. (1991), Sudden Enlightenment Followed by Gradual Cultivation: Tsung-mi's Analysis of mind. In: Peter N. Gregory (editor)(1991), Sudden and Gradual. Approaches to Enlightenment in Chinese Thought, Delhi: Motilal Banarsidass Publishers Private Limited
- Gregory, Peter N. (1993), What Happened to the "Perfect Teaching"? Another lOok at Hua-yen Buddhist hermeneutics. In: Donald S. Lopez, Jr. (ed.)(1993), Buddhist Hermeneutics, Delhi: Motilal Banarsidass
- Harvey, Peter (1995), An introduction to Buddhism. Teachings, history and practices, Cambridge University Press
- Haskel, Peter (1984), Bankei Zen. Translations from The Record of Bankei, New York: Grove Weidenfeld
- Heine, Steven (2007a), "A Critical Survey of Works on Zen since Yampolsky", Philosophy East & West, 57 (4): 577–592, doi:10.1353/pew.2007.0047
- Heine, Steven (2008), Zen Skin, Zen Marrow
- Heine, Steven; Wright, Dale S. (2000). The Koan: Texts and Contexts in Zen Buddhism. Oxford University Press. ISBN 0-19-511748-4.
- Hisamatsu, Shin'ichi; Tokiwa, Gishin; Ives, Christopher (2002), Critical Sermons of the Zen Tradition: Hisamatsu's Talks on Linji, University of Hawaii Press
- Hori, Victor Sogen (1994), Teaching and Learning in the Zen Rinzai Monastery. In: Journal of Japanese Studies, Vol.20, No. 1, (Winter, 1994), 5-35 (PDF), archived from the original on 19 October 2019
- Hori, Victor Sogen (2000), Koan and Kensho in the Rinzai Zen Curriculum. In: Steven Heine and Dale S. Wright (eds)(2000): "The Koan. Texts and Contexts in Zen Buddhism", Oxford: Oxford University Press
- Hori, Victor Sogen (2005), Introduction. In: Dumoulin, Heinrich (2005), Zen Buddhism: A History. Volume 2: Japan. World Wisdom Books. ISBN 978-0-941532-90-7. Pagina xiii - xxi (PDF)
- Hu Shih (1953), "Ch'an (Zen) Buddhism in China. Its History and Method", Philosophy East and West, 3 (1): 3–24, doi:10.2307/1397361, JSTOR 1397361
- Huaijin, Nan (1997), Basic Buddhism: Exploring Buddhism and Zen, York Beach: Samuel Weiser
- Isshū, Miura; Sasaki, Ruth F. (1993), The Zen Koan, New York: Harcourt Brace & Company, ISBN 0-15-699981-1
- Jaksch, Mary (2007), The Road to Nowhere. Koans and the Deconstruction of the Zen Saga (PDF)
- Jorgensen, John (1991), "Heinrich Dumoulin's Zen Buddhism: A History", Japanese Journal of Religious Studies, 18 (4), doi:10.18874/jjrs.18.4.1991.377-400
- Kalupahana, David J. (1992), The Principles of Buddhist Psychology, Delhi: ri Satguru Publications
- Kalupahana, David J. (1994), A history of Buddhist philosophy, Delhi: Motilal Banarsidass Publishers Private Limited
- Kapleau, Philip (1989), The three pillars of Zen
- Kasulis, Thomas P. (2003), Ch'an Spirituality. In: Buddhist Spirituality. Later China, Korea, Japan and the Modern World; edited by Takeuchi Yoshinori, Delhi: Motilal Banarsidass
- Katz, Jerry (2007), One: Essential Writings on Nonduality, Sentient Publications
- Koné, Alioune (2000), Zen In Europe: A Survey of the Territory, archived from the original on 7 May 2012
- Lachs, Stuart (2002), Richard Baker and the Myth of the Zen Roshi
- Lachs, Stuart (2006), The Zen Master in America: Dressing the Donkey with Bells and Scarves
- Lachs, Stuart (2011), When the Saints Go Marching In: Modern Day Zen Hagiography (PDF)
- Lachs, Stuart (2012), Hua-t'ou: A Method of Zen Meditation (PDF)
- Lai, Whalen (2003), Buddhism in China: A Historical Survey. In Antonio S. Cua (ed.): Encyclopedia of Chinese Philosophy (PDF), New York: Routledge, archived from the original (PDF) on 12 November 2014
- Lai, Whalen (2016) [year unknown B], Ma-Tsu Tao-I And The Unfolding Of Southern Zen
- Lathouwers, Ton (2000), Meer dan een mens kan doen. Zentoespraken, Rotterdam: Asoka
- Liang-Chieh (1986), The Record of Tung-shan, translator: William F. Powell, Kuroda Institute
- Lievens, Bavo (1981), Ma-tsu. De gesprekken, Bussum: Het Wereldvenster
- Loori, John Daido (2006), Sitting with Koans: Essential Writings on Zen Koan Introspection, Wisdom Publications, ISBN 0-86171-369-9
- Low, Albert (2000), Zen and the Sutras, Boston: Turtle Publishing
- Low, Albert (2006), Hakuin on Kensho. The Four Ways of Knowing, Boston & London: Shambhala
- Matthiessen, Peter (1987), Nine-headed dragon river: Zen journals, 1969-1985, Shambhala
- McCauley, Charles (2005), Zen and the Art of Wholeness, iUniverse
- McMahan, David L. (2008), The Making of Buddhist Modernism, Oxford University Press, ISBN 978-0-19-518327-6
- McRae, John (1991), Shen-hui and the Teaching of Sudden Enlightenment in Early Ch'an Buddhism. In: Peter N. Gregory (editor)(1991), Sudden and Gradual. Approaches to Enlightenment in Chinese Thought, Delhi: Motilal Banarsidass Publishers Private Limited
- McRae, John (2003), Seeing Through Zen, The University Press Group, ISBN 978-052023798-8
- McRae, John (2005), Critical introduction by John McRae to the reprint of Dumoulin's A history of Zen (PDF)
- McRae, John (2008), THE PLATFORM SUTRA OF THE SIXTH PATRIARCH. Translated from the Chinese of Zongbao (Taishō Volume 48, Number 2008) by John R. McRae (PDF), archived from the original (PDF) on 22 August 2012
- Meng-Tat Chia, Jack (2011), "A Review of Enlightenment in Dispute: The Reinvention of Chan Buddhism in Seventeenth-Century China" (PDF), Journal of Buddhist Ethics, 18
- Mumon, Yamada (2004), The Ten Oxherding Pictures, translator: Victor Sōgen Hori, University of Hawai'i press
- Nadeau, Randall L. (2012), The Wiley-Blackwell Companion to Chinese Religions, John Wiley & Sons
- Oh, Kang-nam (2000), "The Taoist Influence on Hua-yen Buddhism: A Case of the Scinicization of Buddhism in China", Chung-Hwa Buddhist Journal, 13
- Pajin, Dusan (1988), On Faith in Mind - Translation and Analysis of the Hsin Hsin Ming. In: Journal of Oriental Studies, Vol. XXVI, No. 2, Hong Kong 1988, pp. 270-288
- Poceski, Mario (n.d.), Attitudes Towards Canonicity and Religious Authority in Tang Chan
- Sasaki, Ruth Fuller (2009), The Record of Linji. Translation and commentary by Ruth Fuller Sasaki. Edited by Thomas Yūhō Kirchner (PDF), Honolulu: University of Hawai'i Press
- Satō, Kemmyō Taira (2008), "D.T. Suzuki and the Question of War" (PDF), The Eastern Buddhist, 39 (1), translated in collaboration with Thomas Kirchner: 61–120
- Schlütter, Morten (2008a), How Zen became Zen. The Dispute over Enlightenment and the Formation of Chan Buddhism in Song-Dynasty China, Honolulu: University of Hawai'i Press, ISBN 978-0-8248-3508-8
- Sekida, Katuski (1996), Two Zen Classics. Mumonkan, the gateless gate. Hekiganroku, the blue cliff record, New York & Tokyo: Weatherhill
- Sharf, Robert H. (August 1993), "The Zen of Japanese Nationalism", History of Religions, 33 (1): 1–43, doi:10.1086/463354
- Sharf, Robert H. (1995b), "Buddhist Modernism and the Rhetoric of Meditative Experience" (PDF), NUMEN, 42 (3): 228–283, doi:10.1163/1568527952598549, hdl:2027.42/43810
- Sharf, Robert H. (1995c), "Sanbokyodan. Zen and the Way of the New Religions" (PDF), Japanese Journal of Religious Studies, 22 (3–4), doi:10.18874/jjrs.22.3-4.1995.417-458
- Sharf, Robert H. (1995d), Whose Zen? Zen Nationalism Revisited (PDF)
- Shimano, Eido T. (1991), Points of Departure: Zen Buddhism With a Rinzai View, Livingston Manor, NY: The Zen Studies Society Press, ISBN 0-9629246-0-1
- Snelling, John (1987), The Buddhist handbook. A Complete Guide to Buddhist Teaching and Practice, London: Century Paperbacks
- The Surangama Sutra (PDF), translated by Luk, Charles, Buddha Dharma Education Association, n.d., archived from the original (PDF) on 23 October 2013
- Suzuki, Shunryu (1997), Branching streams flow in the darkness: Zen talks on the Sandokai, University of California Press, ISBN 978-052022226-7
- Swanson, Paul L. (1993), The Spirituality of Emptiness in Early chinese Buddhism. In: Buddhist Spirituality. Indian, Southeast Asian, Tibetan, Early Chinese; edited by Takeuchi Yoshinori, New York: Crossroad
- Tetsuo, Otani (2003), To Transmit Dogen Zenji's Dharma (PDF)
- Thompson, John M. (2005), Particular and universal: the problems posed by Shaku Soen's "Zen" (PDF)
- Tomoaki, Tsuchida (2003), The Monastic spirituality of Zen Master Dogen. In: Buddhist Spirituality. Later China, Korea, Japan and the Modern World; edited by Takeuchi Yoshinori, Delhi: Motilal Banarsidass
- Torei (2010), The Undying Lamp of Zen. The Testament of Zen Master Torei, translator: Thomas Cleary, Boston & London: Shambhala
- Tweed, Thomas A. (2005), "American Occultism and Japanese Buddhism. Albert J. Edmunds, D. T. Suzuki, and Translocative History" (PDF), Japanese Journal of Religious Studies, 32 (2): 249–281, archived from the original (PDF) on 22 May 2012
- Verstappen, Stefan H. (2004), Blind Zen, Red Mansion Pub, ISBN 978-189168803-4
- Victoria, Brian Daizen (2006), Zen at war (Second ed.), Lanham e.a.: Rowman & Littlefield Publishers
- Victoria, Brian Daizen (2010), "The "Negative Side" of D. T. Suzuki's Relationship to War" (PDF), The Eastern Buddhist, 41 (2): 97–138
- Waddell, Norman (2010), Foreword to "Wild Ivy: The Spiritual Autobiography of Zen Master Hakuin", Shambhala Publications
- Wayman, Alex and Hideko (1990), The Lion's roar of Queen Srimala, Delhi: Motilal Banarsidass Publishers
- Welter, Albert (n.d.), The Textual History of the Linji lu (Record of Linji): The Earliest Recorded Fragments
- Welter, Albert (2000), Mahakasyapa's smile. Silent Transmission and the Kung-an (Koan) Tradition. In: Steven Heine and Dale S. Wright (eds)(2000): "The Koan. Texts and Contexts in Zen Buddhism", Oxford: Oxford University Press
- Welter, Albert (2016) [year unknown-B], The Formation of the Linji lu: An Examination of the Guangdeng lu/Sijia yulu and Linji Huizhao Chanshi yulu. Versions of the Linji lu in Historical Context (PDF)
- Wolfe, Robert (2009), Living Nonduality: Enlightenment Teachings of Self-Realization, Karina Library
- Wright, Dale S. (2010), Humanizing the Image of a Zen master: Taizan Maezumi Roshi. In: Zen Masters, edited bySteven Heine and Dale S. Wright, Oxford: Oxford University Press
- Yampolski, Philip (1967), The Platform Sutra of the Sixth Patriarch. Translated with notes by Philip B. Yampolsky, Columbia University Press, ISBN 0-231-08361-0
- Yampolski, Philip (2003a), Chan. A Historical Sketch. In: Buddhist Spirituality. Later China, Korea, Japan and the Modern World; edited by Takeuchi Yoshinori, Delhi: Motilal Banarsidass
- Yampolski, Philip (2003b), Zen. A Historical Sketch. In: Buddhist Spirituality. Later China, Korea, Japan and the Modern World; edited by Takeuchi Yoshinori, Delhi: Motilal Banarsidass
- Yanagida, Seizan (2009), Historical Introduction to The Record of Linji. In: The record of Linji, translated by Ruth Fuller Sasakia e.a. Pages 59-115 (PDF), University of Hawaii Press
- Yen, Chan Master Sheng (1996), Dharma Drum: The Life and Heart of Ch'an Practice, Boston & London: Shambhala
- Young, Stuart (2009), Linji Lu and Chinese Orthodoxy. Review of "Albert Welter. The Linji lu and the Creation of Chan Orthodoxy: The Development of Chan's Records of Sayings Literature"
