= List of Buddhist temples in the United States =

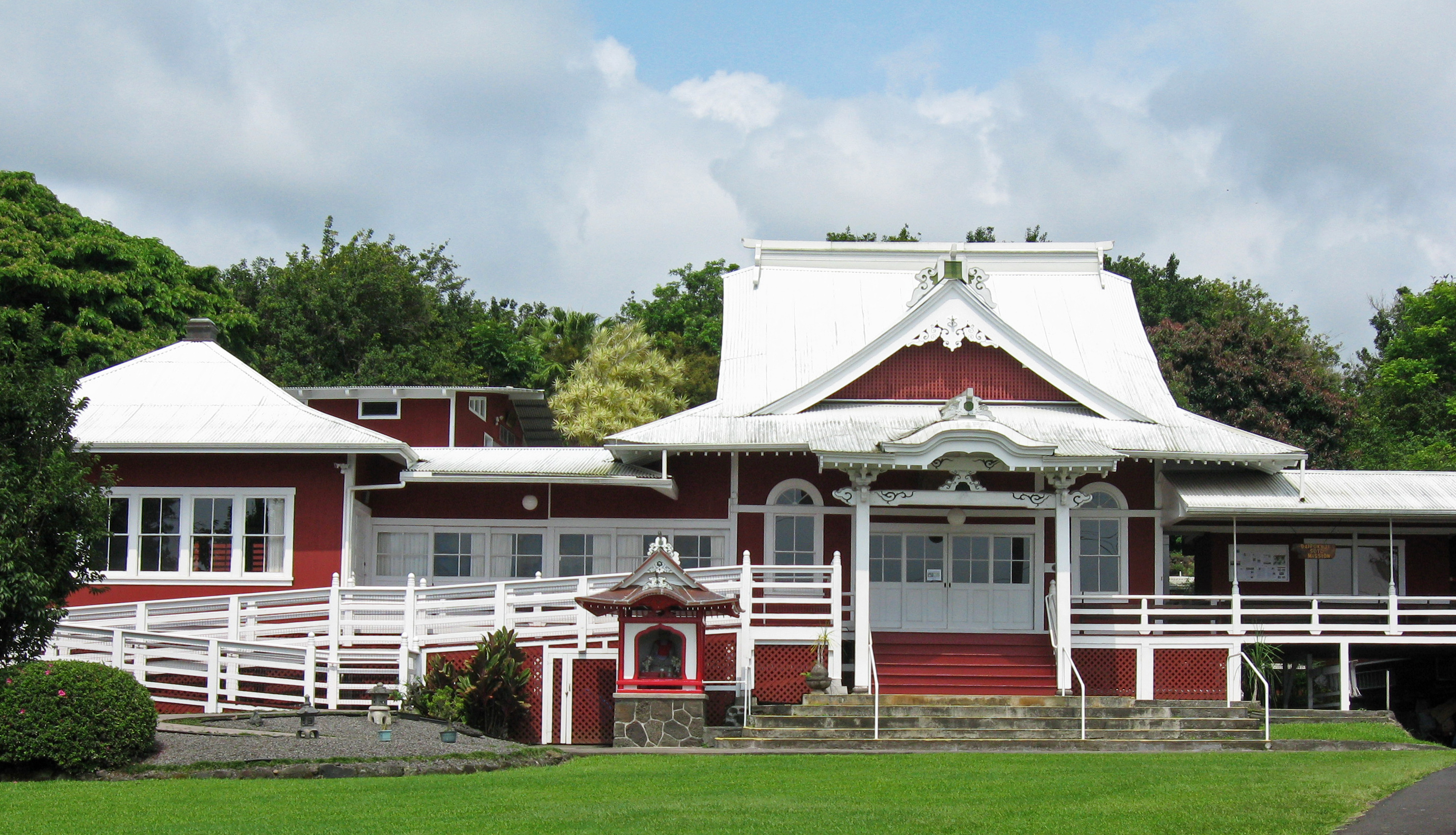
Daifukuji Soto Zen Mission (Japanese) in Honalo, Hawaii – on the U.S. National Register of Historic Places

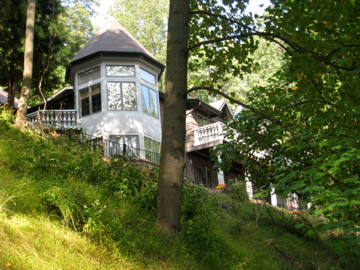
So Shim Sa Zen Center (Korean) in Plainfield, New Jersey

This is a list of Buddhist temples, monasteries, stupas, and pagodas in the United States sorted by location.

== Arizona ==
- Arizona Buddhist Temple, Phoenix

== California ==
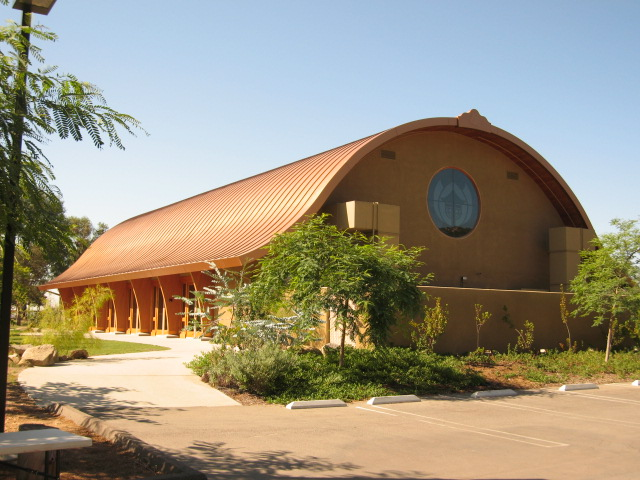
Deer Park Monastery meditation hall (Vietnamese) in Escondido, California

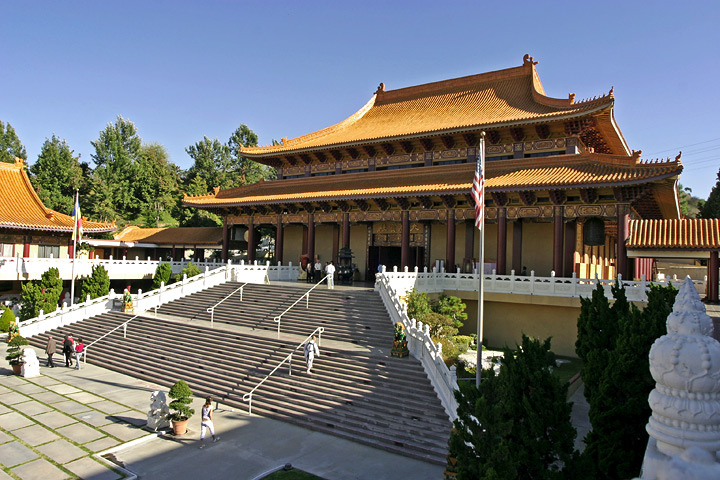
Hsi Lai Temple (Chinese) in Hacienda Heights, California – the largest Buddhist temple in the United States

- Abhayagiri Buddhist Monastery, Redwood Valley
- Beginner's Mind Temple, San Francisco
- Berkeley Zen Center, Berkeley
- City Of Ten Thousand Buddhas, Talmage
- Deer Park Monastery, Escondido
- Fresno Buddhist Temple (Mrauk Oo Dhamma)
- Green Gulch Farm, Muir Beach
- Hartford Street Zen Center, San Francisco
- Hazy Moon Zen Center, Los Angeles
- Hsi Lai Temple, Hacienda Heights
- Koyasan Buddhist Temple, Little Tokyo, Los Angeles
- Metta Forest Monastery, Valley Center
- Mount Baldy Zen Center, Mount San Antonio
- Pao Fa Temple, Irvine
- Pacific Zen Institute, Santa Rosa
- San Fran Dhammaram Temple, San Francisco
- San Francisco Zen Center, San Francisco
- Senshin Buddhist Temple, Los Angeles
- Shasta Abbey, Mount Shasta
- Sonoma Mountain Zen Center, Santa Rosa
- Spirit Rock Meditation Center, Woodacre
- Tassajara Zen Mountain Center, Carmel Valley
- Walnut Grove Buddhist Church, Walnut Grove
- Wat Buddhanusorn, Fremont
- Wat Mongkolratanaram, Berkeley
- Yokoji Zen Mountain Center, near Idyllwild
- Zen Center of Los Angeles, Los Angeles
- Zenshuji Soto Mission, Los Angeles
- Bát Nhã Temple, Santa Ana, California
- Bảo Quang Temple, Santa Ana, California
- Điều Ngự Temple, Westminster, California
- Huệ Quang Temple, Westminster, California
- Đức Viên Temple, San Jose, California
- Quan Âm Temple, Garden Grove, California
- Khánh Hỷ Temple, Garden Grove, California

== Colorado ==
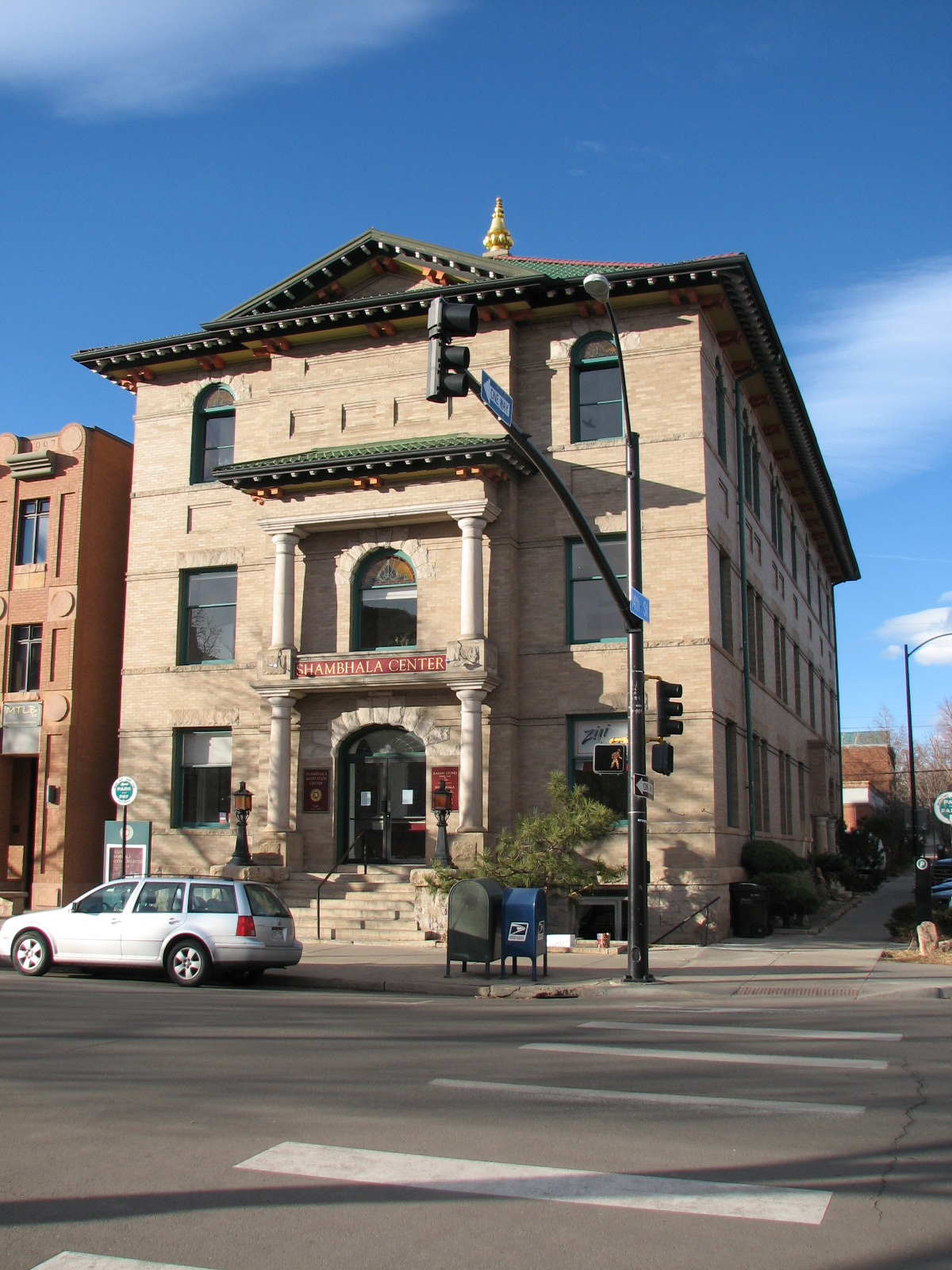
Shambhala Center (Tibetan) in Boulder, Colorado

- Chöying Dzong, Nyingma Buddhist temple, and Yeshe Khorlo Retreat Center, Crestone
- Great Stupa of Dharmakaya, Drala Mountain Center, Red Feather Lakes
- Longchen Jigme Samten Ling, Nyingma Buddhist Temple, Crestone
- Longmont Buddhist Temple, Longmont
- Phuntsok Choling, Nyingma Buddhist Temple, Ward
- Tri-State Denver Buddhist Temple, Denver
- Wat Buddhapunyaram, Tai Lü Buddhist Temple, Brighton

== Connecticut ==
- Buddhist Faith Fellowship of Connecticut, Middletown
- Do Ngak Kunphen Ling Tibetan Buddhist Center for Universal Peace, Redding

== Florida ==
- Guang Ming Temple, Orlando
- Wat Florida Dhammaram, Kissimmee
- Wat Mongkolratanaram, Tampa

== Georgia ==
- Atlanta Soto Zen Center, Atlanta

== Hawaii ==
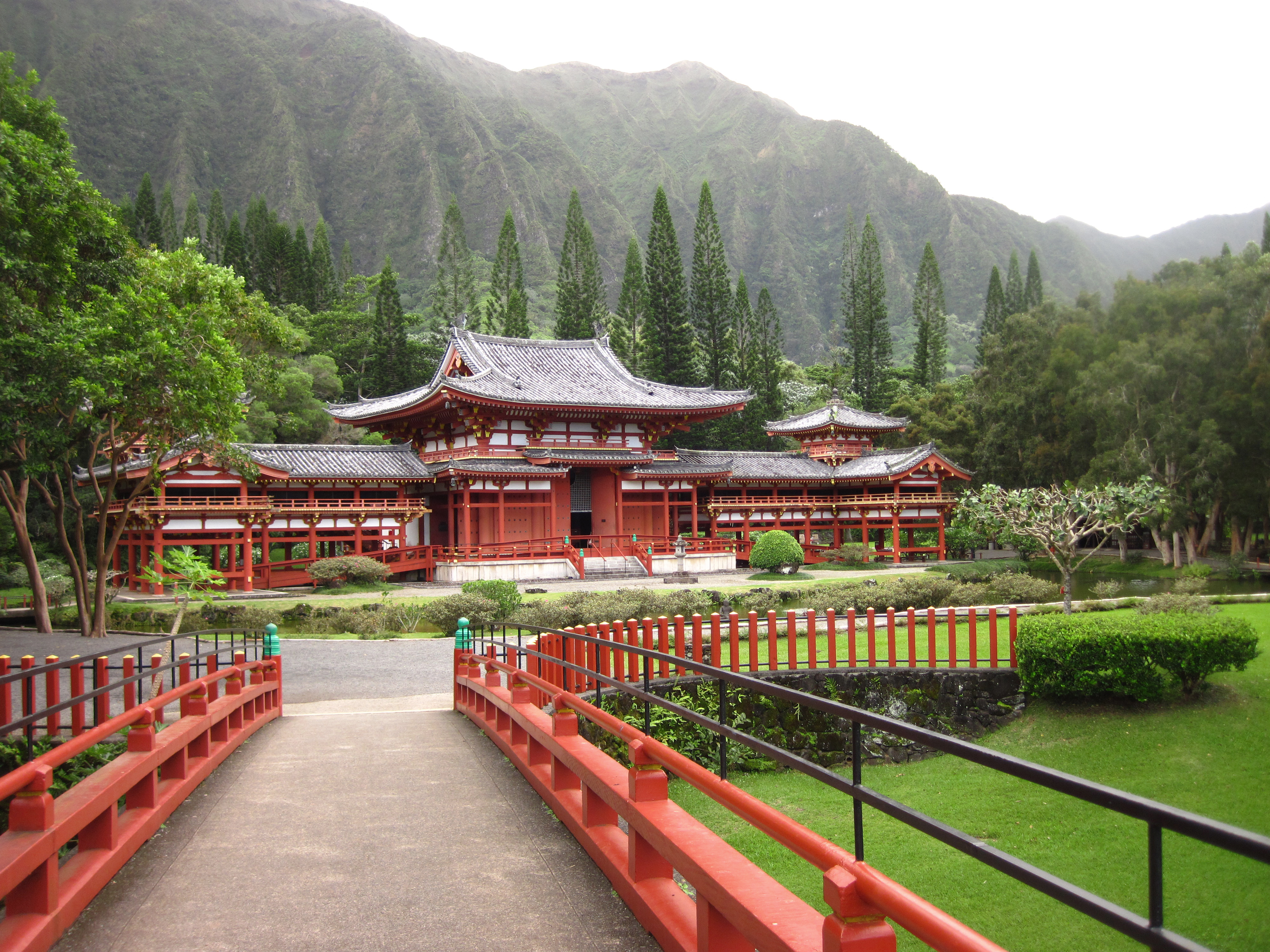
Byodo-In Temple (Japanese) O'ahu, Hawaii

- Broken Ridge Buddhist Temple, Honolulu
- Byodo-In Temple, Kaneohe
- Daifukuji Soto Zen Mission, Honalo
- Daihonzan Chozen-ji, Kalihi Valley, Oahu
- Hawaii Shingon Mission, Honolulu
- Lāhainā Jodo Mission, Lahaina
- Wood Valley Temple, Pahala
- Chân Không Monastery, Honolulu, Hawaii
- Long Sơn Thanh Nguyên Monastery, Kunia, Hawaii
- Linh Sơn Temple, Wahiawa, Hawaii

== Illinois ==
- Buddhist Temple of Chicago, Chicago
- Chicago Zen Center, Evanston
- Daiyuzenji, Chicago
- Midwest Buddhist Temple, Chicago

== Kentucky ==
- Furnace Mountain, Stanton
- The Contemplative Garden, Louisville

== Louisiana ==
- Chua Bo De, New Orleans
- New Orleans Zen Temple, New Orleans
- Wat Buddhasamakeevanaram, Bossier City

== Maryland ==
- Kunzang Palyul Choling, Poolesville

== Massachusetts ==
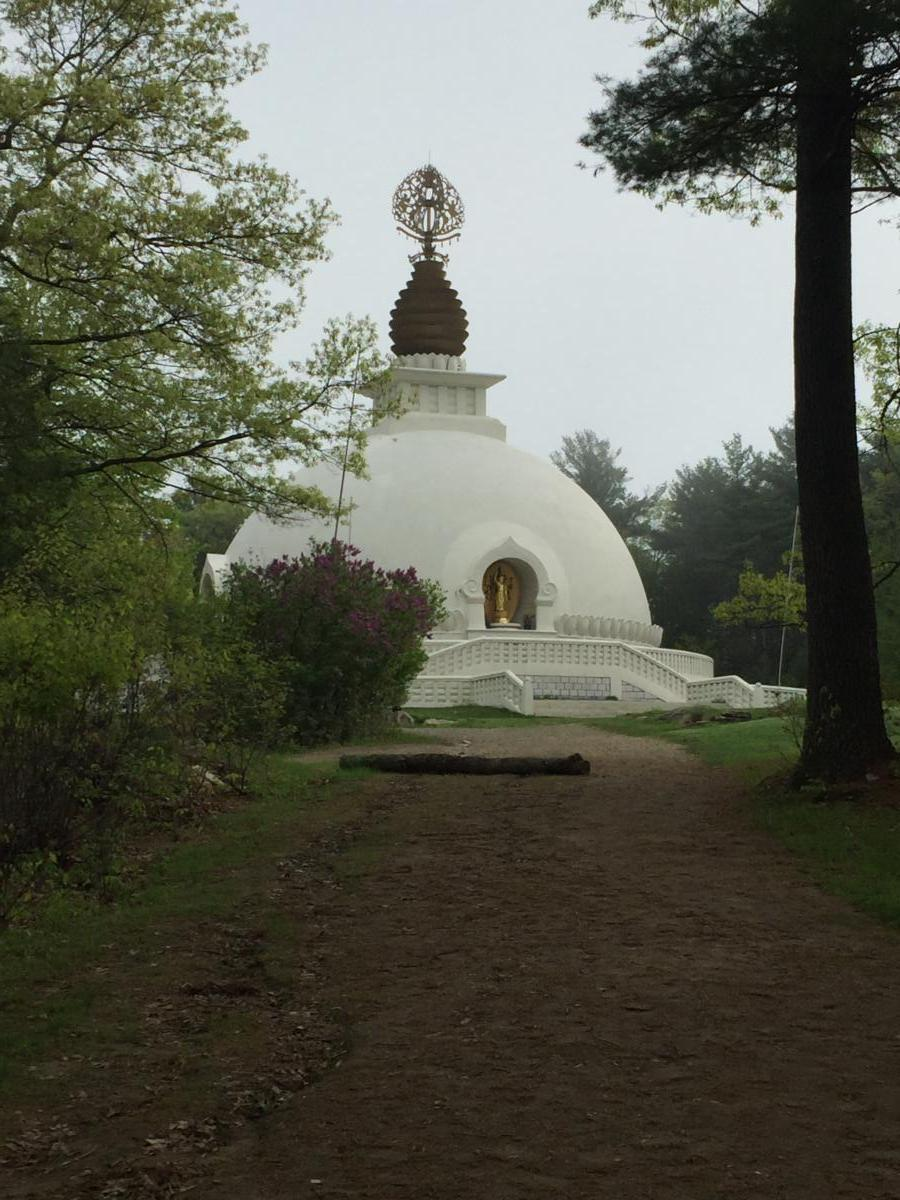
New England Peace Pagoda

- Boundless Way Zen, Worcester
- Cambridge Zen Center, Cambridge
- Glory Buddhist Temple, Lowell
- New England Peace Pagoda, Leverett
- Tsegyalgar East, Conway
- Valley Zendo, Charlemont
- Wat Boston Buddha Vararam, Bedford
- Wat Nawamintararachutis, Raynham

== Michigan ==
- Lake Superior Zendo, Marquette

== Minnesota ==
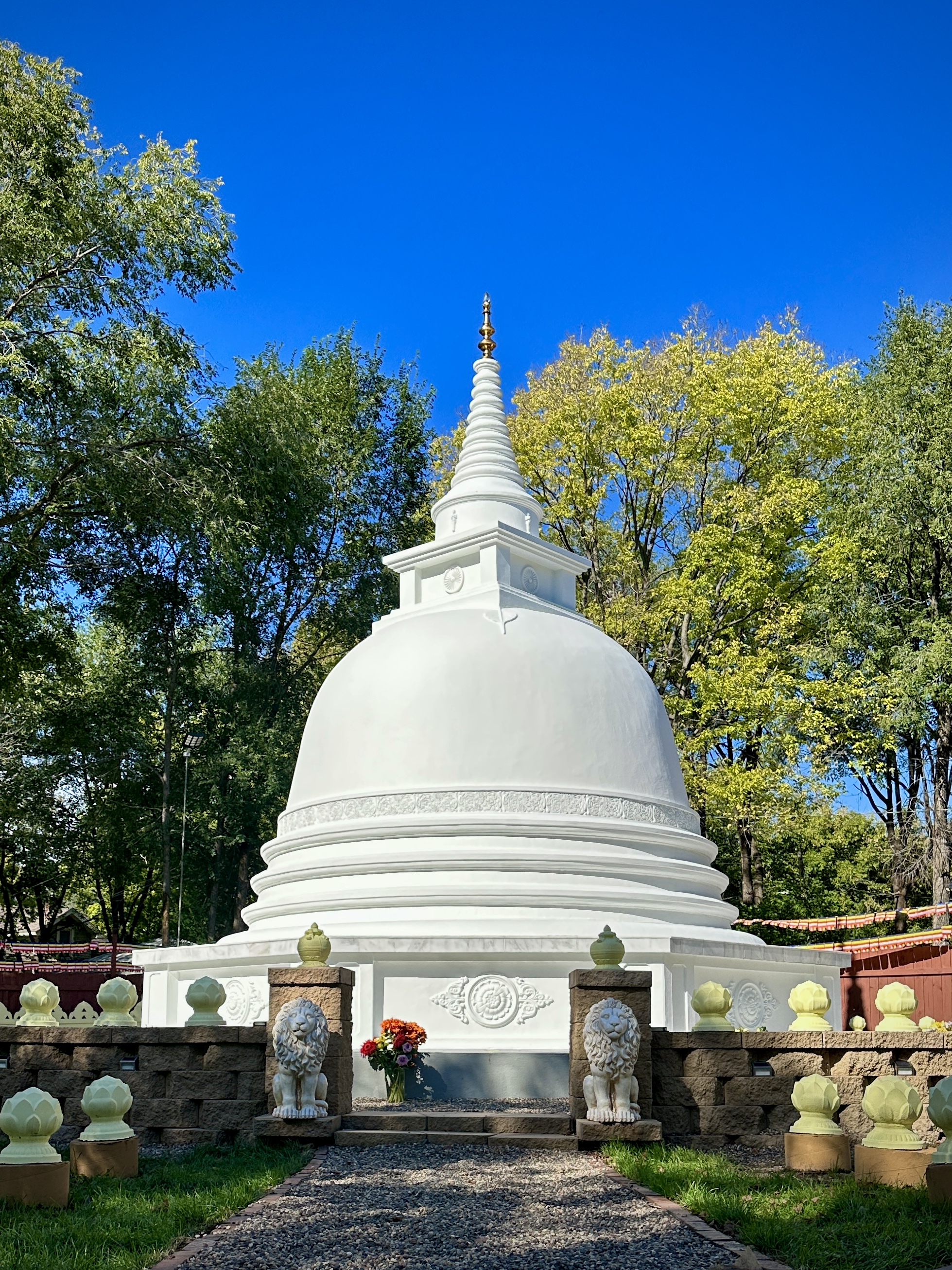
A sacred stupa at Minnesota Buddhist Vihara in Minneapolis, Minnesota

- Dharma Field Zen Center, Minneapolis
- Minnesota Buddhist Vihara, Minneapolis
- Minnesota Zen Center, Minneapolis

== Mississippi ==
- Magnolia Grove Monastery, Batesville

== Missouri ==
- Dinh Quang Buddhist Temple, Springfield
- Fo Guang Shan St. Louis Buddhist Center, Bridgeton
- Light of Dhamma Burmese Buddhist Monastery, Kansas City
- Mid-America Buddhist Association, Augusta
- Missouri Buddhist Meditation Center, Hazelwood
- Pho Hien Temple, Kansas City
- Quan Am Temple - Kansas City, Kansas City
- Rime Buddhist Center, Kansas City
- Temple Buddhist Center, Kansas City
- Tu Bi Temple, Kansas City
- Wat Buddhamanee Rattanaram, Arnold
- Wat Buddha Samagkeedham Temple, St. Louis
- Wat Phrasriratanaram, Florissant
- Vo Luong Quang Temple, St. Louis

== Montana ==
- Garden of One Thousand Buddhas

== Nebraska ==
- Linh Quang Buddhist Center, Lincoln

== Nevada ==
- Las Vegas Buddhist Sangha, Las Vegas

== New Jersey ==
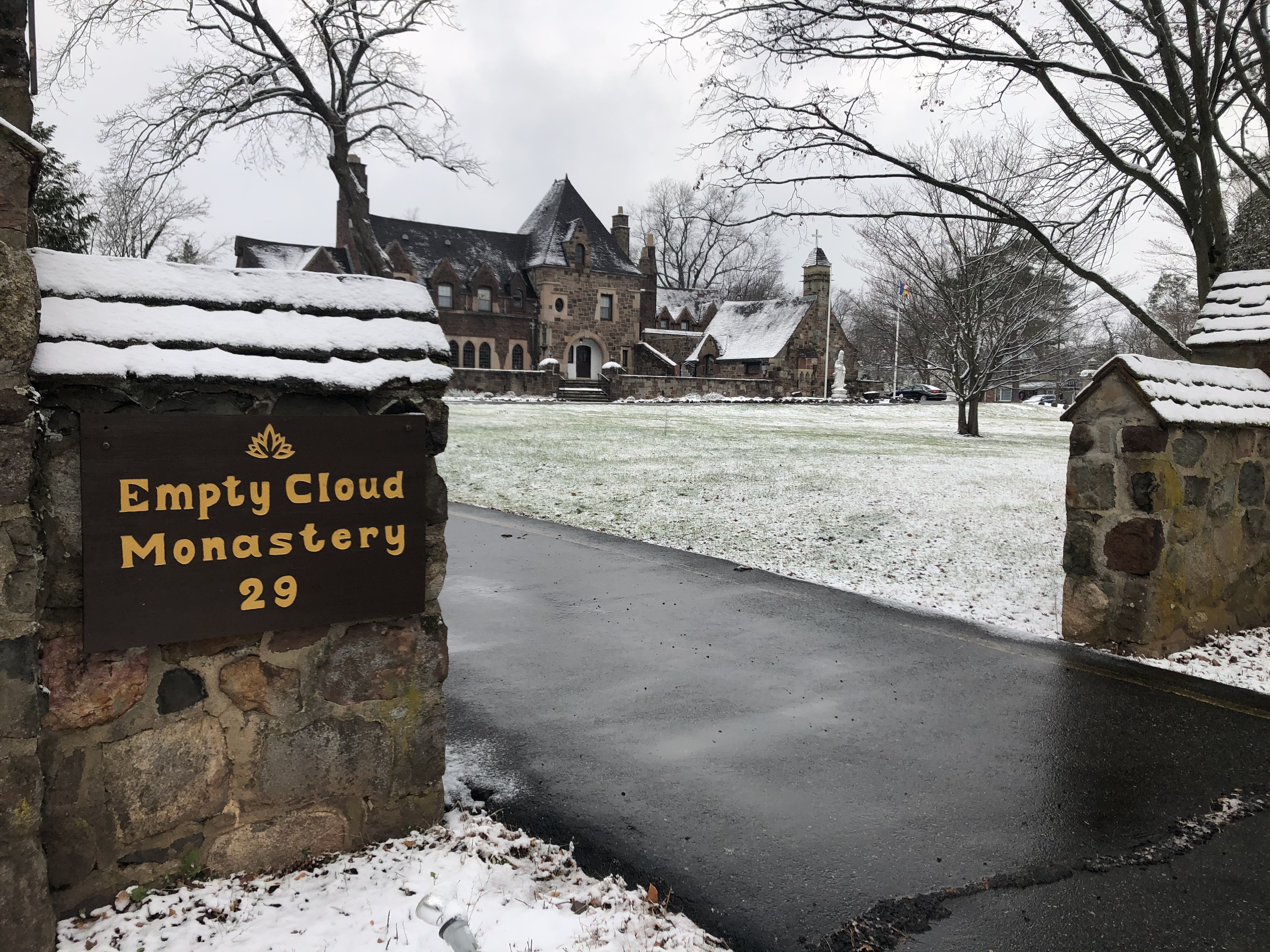
Empty Cloud Monastery in West Orange, New Jersey

- Empty Cloud Monastery, West Orange
- Seabrook Buddhist Temple, Upper Deerfield Township
- So Shim Sa Zen Center, Plainfield

== New Mexico ==
- Hokoji Zendo, Arroyo Seco
- Kagyu Shenpen Kunchab, Santa Fe
- Upaya Institute and Zen Center, Santa Fe
- Zuni Mountain Stupa, Grants

== New York ==
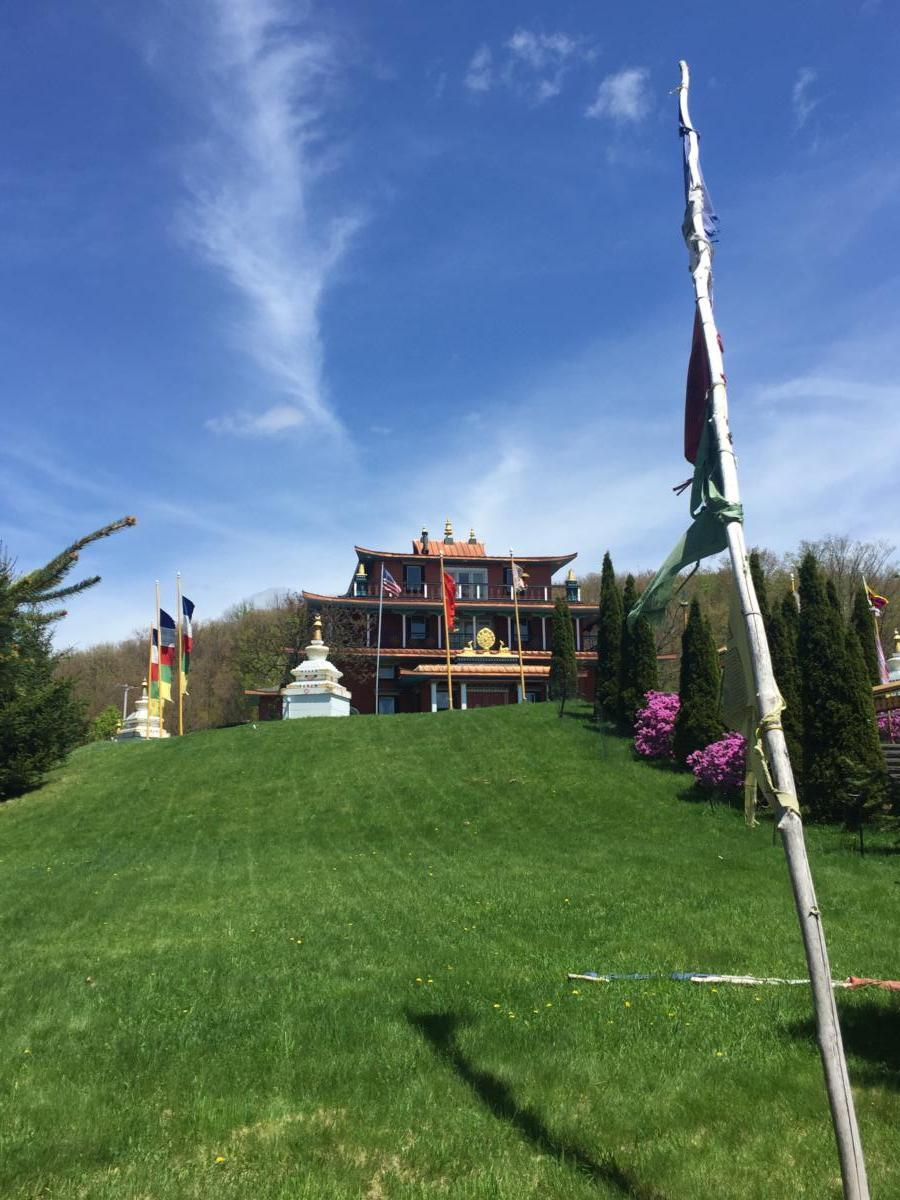
Palden Padma Samye Ling in 2018

- Blue Cliff Monastery, Pine Bush
- Chapin Mill Buddhist Retreat Center, Batavia
- Chogye International Zen Center, New York
- Chuang Yen Monastery, Kent
- Dai Bosatsu Zendo Kongo-ji, Livingston Manor
- Karma Triyana Dharmachakra, Woodstock
- Mahamevnawa Buddhist Meditation Center of New York, Staten Island
- New York Buddhist Church, Manhattan
- New York Mahayana Temple, Leeds
- New York Zendo Shobo-Ji, Manhattan
- Palden Padma Samye Ling, Sidney Center
- Rochester Zen Center, Rochester
- Shi Yan Ming, New York
- Vajiradhammapadip Temple, Centereach and Mount Vernon
- Village Zendo, New York
- Zen Center of Syracuse, Syracuse
- Zen Mountain Monastery, Mount Tremper

== North Carolina ==
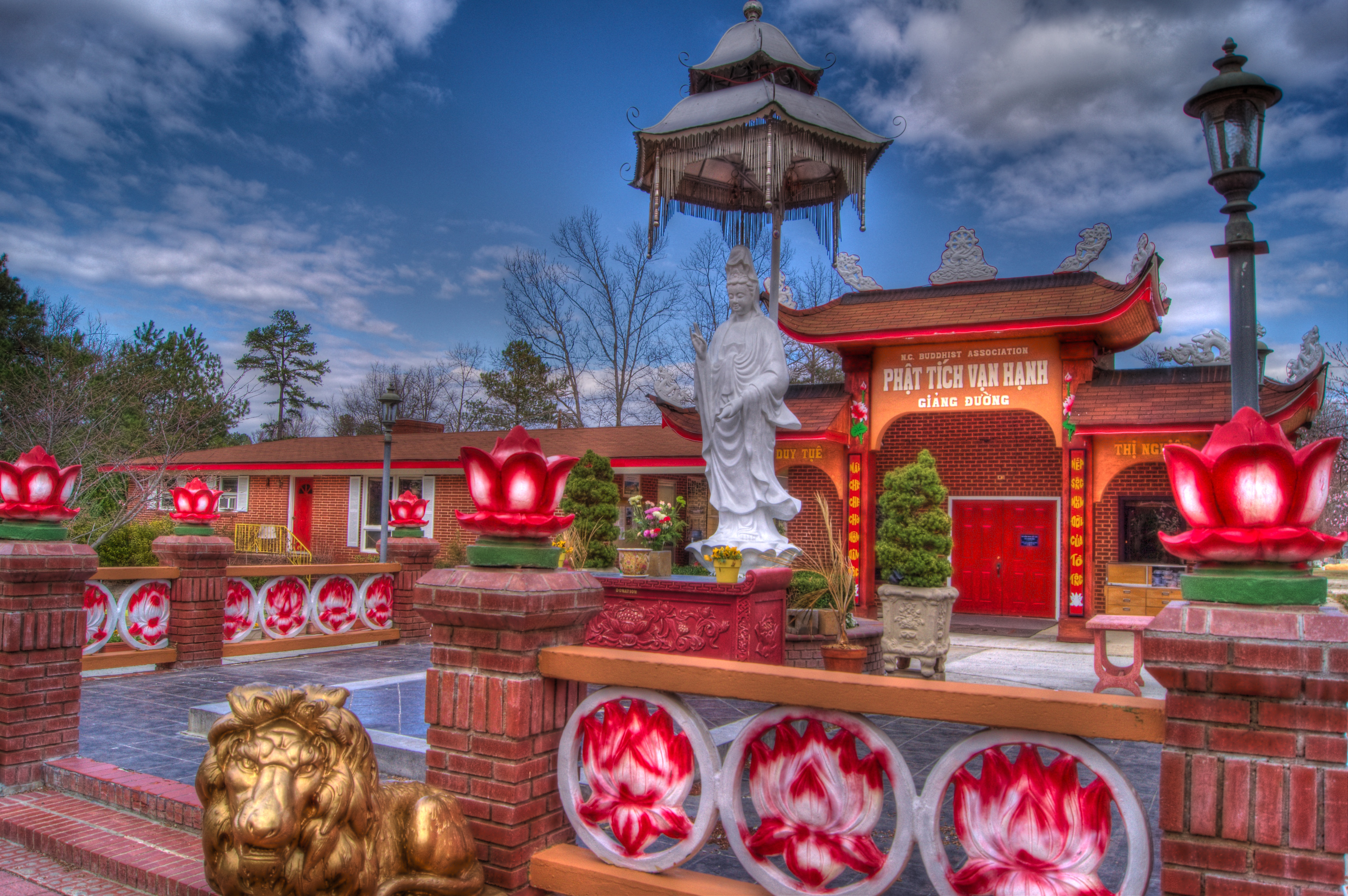
Phật Tích Vạn Hạnh Temple (Vietnamese), Raleigh, North Carolina

- Wat Carolina Buddhajakra Vanaram, Bolivia

== Ohio ==
- The Buddhist Temple of Toledo, Toledo
- Cleveland Buddhist Temple, Shaker Heights
- Cleveland Buddhist Vihara & Meditation Center, Akron

== Oregon ==
- Great Vow Zen Monastery, Clatskanie
- Idaho-Oregon Buddhist Temple, Ontario
- Oregon Buddhist Temple, Portland

== Pennsylvania ==
- Chenrezig Tibetan Buddhist Center of Philadelphia, Philadelphia
- Chùa Bồ Đề, South Philadelphia
- Pittsburgh Buddhist Center, Allison Park
- Preah Buddha Rangsey Temple, Philadelphia
- Wat Khmer Palelai Monastery, Philadelphia
- Wat Padhammaratana, Monroeville
- Zen Center of Pittsburgh, Deep Spring Temple, Sewickley

== Rhode Island ==
- Providence Zen Center, Cumberland

== Texas ==
Wat Buddhavas of Houston (Thai) in Houston, Texas

- American Bodhi Center, Waller County
- Chua Buu Mon, Port Arthur
- Chua Linh-Son Buddhist Temple, Austin
- Jade Buddha Temple, Houston
- Maria Kannon Zen Center, Dallas
- Wat Buddhananachat of Austin, Del Valle
- Vietnamm Buddhist Center - Trung Tâm Phật Giáo Chùa Việt Nam, Houston, Texas

== Utah ==
- Honeyville Buddhist Temple, Honeyville
- Kanzeon Zen Center, Salt Lake City
- Ogden Buddhist Church, Ogden
- Salt Lake Buddhist Temple, Salt Lake City

== Virginia ==
- Ekoji Buddhist Temple, Fairfax Station
- Wat Pasantidhamma, Carrollton

== Washington ==
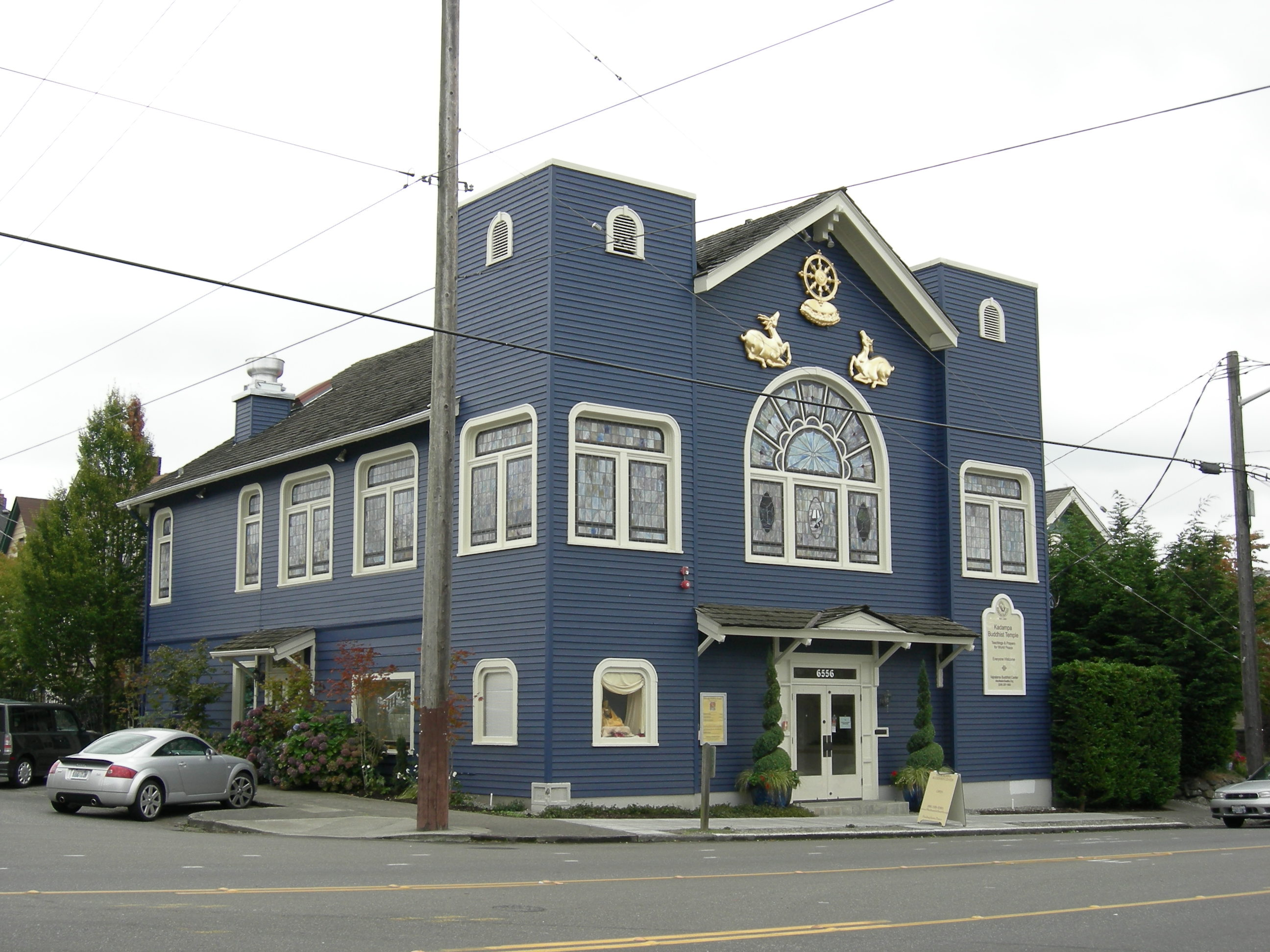
Kadampa Buddhist Temple in Seattle, Washington

- Buddhangkura Buddhist Temple, Thai Theravadan lineage, Olympia
- Chua Lien Hoa, Vietnamese Rinzai Zen lineage Olympia
- Dai Bai Zan Cho Bo Zen Temple, Seattle
- Ground Zero for Nonviolent Action Peace Pagoda, Bremerton
- Mt. Adams Buddhist Temple, Trout Lake
- Nalanda Institute, Olympia
- Olympia Zen Center, Soto Zen lineage Olympia
- Open Gate Zendo, Olympia
- Pacific Hermitage, White Salmon
- Padma Raja Society, Poulsbo
- Seattle Betsuin Buddhist Temple, Seattle
- Spokane Buddhist Church, Spokane
- Sravasti Abbey, Newport
- Tacoma Buddhist Temple, Tacoma
- Tushita Kadampa Buddhist Center, Olympia
- White River Buddhist Temple, Auburn
- Yakima Buddhist Church, Wapato

== Wisconsin ==
- Deer Park Buddhist Center and Monastery, Oregon
- Sotekizan Korinzenji, Madison

== See also ==
- Buddhism in the United States
  - Category:Buddhism in the United States
- Buddhists in the United States military
- List of Buddhist temples

== Sources ==
- BuddhaNet's Comprehensive Directory of Buddhist Temples sorted by country
- Buddhactivity Dharma Centres database
