= List of monasteries in the United States =

The following is an incomplete list of monasteries in the United States.

== Alabama ==
=== Christian ===
- St. Bernard Abbey, a Benedictine monastery and preparatory school located in Cullman. Originally founded by monks from Saint Vincent Archabbey in 1891 to serve the predominantly German community of Cullman. Home to Ave Maria Grotto.

== Arizona ==
=== Christian ===
- Our Lady of Solitude Monastery, a Franciscan monastery located in Tonopah.
- Santa Rita Abbey, a Trappistine monastery located in Sonoita.
- St. Anthony's Greek Orthodox Monastery, a Greek Orthodox monastery located in Florence.
- St. Paisius Orthodox Monastery, an Eastern Orthodox monastery located in Safford.

== Arkansas ==
=== Buddhist ===
- Gyobutsuji Zen Monastery, a Sōtō Zen monastery located in Kingston.

=== Christian ===
- Marylake Carmelite Monastery, a Roman Catholic monastery located in East End, Arkansas, south of Little Rock.
- Subiaco Abbey, a Benedictine monastery located in Subiaco.
- Little Portion Monastery and Hermitage, Brothers and Sisters of Charity founded by John Michael Talbot. Berryville, AR

== Alaska ==
=== Christian ===
- Blessed Sacrament Monastery, a Roman Catholic monastery located in Anchorage.
- St. Archangel Michael Skete, an Eastern Orthodox monastery located in Spruce Island.
- St. Nilus Island Skete, an Eastern Orthodox monastery located in Nelson Island.

== California ==
=== Buddhist ===
- Abhayagiri Buddhist Monastery, a Thai Forest Tradition monastery located in Redwood Valley.
- Berkeley Buddhist Monastery, a Chan Buddhist monastery located in Berkeley.
- City of Ten Thousand Buddhas, a Chan Buddhist monastery located in Talmage.
- Deer Park Monastery, an Order of Interbeing monastery located in Escondido.
- Dhammadharini Vihara, a Theravāda monastery located in Santa Rosa.
- Mettā Forest Monastery, a Theravāda monastery located in Valley Center.
- Shasta Abbey, a Sōtō Zen monastery located in Mount Shasta.
- Tassajara Zen Mountain Center, a Sōtō Zen monastery located in Carmel Valley, San Diego.

=== Christian ===
- Abbey of New Clairvaux, a Roman Catholic monastery located in Vina.
- Holy Cross Orthodox Monastery, an Eastern Orthodox monastery located in Castro Valley.
- New Camaldoli Hermitage, a Benedictine monastery located in Big Sur.
- Our Lady of the Redwoods Abbey, a Roman Catholic monastery located in Whitethorn.
- Prince of Peace Abbey, a Benedictine monastery in Oceanside.
- Saint Herman of Alaska Monastery, an Eastern Orthodox monastery located in Platina.
- St. Andrew's Abbey, a Benedictine monastery located in Valyermo.
- St. Michael's Abbey, a Roman Catholic monastery located in Silverado.
- St. Xenia Serbian Orthodox Skete, an Eastern Orthodox monastery located in Wildwood.
- The Meeting of the Lord Serbian Orthodox Monastery in Escondido, California Also, known as Sretenje Monastery

== Colorado ==
=== Christian ===
- St. Benedict's Monastery, a former Roman Catholic monastery located in Snowmass.

=== Buddhist ===
- Great Dharma Chan, a Chan location located in Boulder, Colorado

== Connecticut ==
=== Christian ===
- Abbey of Regina Laudis, a Benedictine monastery located in Bethlehem.

== Florida ==
=== Buddhist ===
- Wat Florida Dhammaram, a Theravāda monastery located in Kissimmee.

=== Christian ===
- Holy Name Monastery, a Benedictine monastery located in St. Leo.
- Saint Leo Abbey, a Benedictine monastery located in St. Leo.

== Georgia ==
=== Christian ===
- Monastery of the Holy Spirit, a Trappist monastery located in Conyers, Georgia.
- Savannah Priory, a Benedictine monastery located in Savannah.

== Idaho ==
=== Christian ===
- St. Gertrude's Convent and Chapel, a Benedictine monastery located in Cottonwood.

== Illinois ==
=== Christian ===
- Marmion Abbey, a Benedictine monastery located in Aurora.
- Monastery of the Holy Cross, a Benedictine monastery located in the Bridgeport neighborhood of Chicago.
- New Gračanica Monastery, an Eastern Orthodox monastery located in Third Lake.
- Passionist Fathers Monastery, a historic Roman Catholic monastery located in Chicago.
- Saint Sava Serbian Orthodox Monastery and Seminary, an Eastern Orthodox monastery located in Libertyville.

== Indiana ==
=== Christian ===
- Monastery Immaculate Conception, a Benedictine monastery located in Ferdinand.
- St. Meinrad Archabbey, a Benedictine monastery located in Saint Meinrad.
- St. Xenia Metochion (St. Xenia Monastic Community), a Serbian Orthodox monastic community at 1901 Pennsylvania St. in Indianapolis, Indiana
- Nativity of the Mother of God Monastery, a Serbian Orthodox women's monastery, located at 32787 Early Road in New Carlisle, Indiana
- Our Lady of Grace, a Benedictine monastery located in Beech Grove.

== Iowa ==
=== Christian ===
- New Melleray Abbey, a Trappist monastery located in Dubuque.
- Our Lady of the Mississippi Abbey, a Trappistine monastery located in Dubuque.
- Regina Coeli Monastery, a historic Carmelite monastery located in Bettendorf.

== Kansas ==
=== Christian ===
- St. Benedict's Abbey, a Benedictine monastery located in Atchison.

== Kentucky ==
=== Christian ===
- Abbey of Our Lady of Gethsemani, a Roman Catholic monastery located in Bardstown, Kentucky.
- St. Anne Convent, a Roman Catholic monastery located in Melbourne.
- St. Rose Priory, a Roman Catholic monastery located in Springfield.
- Leoxanthous, a Protestant monastery located in Hickory.

== Louisiana ==
=== Christian ===
- Dominican Sisters of the Heart of Jesus, a Roman Catholic monastery located in Lockport.
- Monastery of Mary, Mother of Grace, a Roman Catholic monastery located in Lafayette.
- St. Joseph Abbey, a Benedictine monastery located in Saint Benedict.
- Discalced Carmelite Nuns, a Roman Catholic monastery located in Covington, Louisiana.

== Maryland ==
- Mount Carmel Monastery, a Carmelite monastery located in Port Tobacco Village.
- Shrine of St. Anthony, a Conventual Franciscan friary located in Ellicott City.

== Massachusetts ==
=== Christian ===
- Community of Jesus, an ecumenical Benedictine monastery located in Orleans.
- Glastonbury Abbey, a Catholic Benedictine monastery located in Hingham.
- Mount Saint Mary's Abbey, a Catholic Trappistine monastery in Wrentham.
- Society of St. John the Evangelist, an Anglican monastery in Cambridge.
- St. Benedict Abbey, a Catholic Benedictine monastery following the Tridentine Rite located in Harvard.
- St. Joseph's Abbey, a Catholic Trappist monastery located in Spencer.

== Michigan ==
=== Christian ===
- St. Gregory's Abbey, an Anglican monastery in Three Rivers.
- St. Sabbas Russian Orthodox Monastery, an Eastern Orthodox monastery in Harper Woods.
- Monastery of Saint Nikolaj Velimirovich Bishop of Zicha is located at 6905 Springborn Road in China Township, Michigan, and is under the jurisdiction of the Serbian Orthodox Eparchy of New Gračanica and Midwestern America, with V. Rev. Radisa Ninkovich as its founder and caretaker.
- Monastery of All Serbian Saints is located at 1712 Hassen Road in Columbus Township, St. Clair County, Michigan. In 2015, a four-hectare property was purchased by Serbian faithful living in the United States of America on behalf of the defrocked bishop Artemije Radosavljević of the Eparchy of Raška and Prizren-in- exile. The monastery is independent of the Serbian Orthodox Church, however, the liturgical service is the same.

== Minnesota ==
=== Buddhist ===
- Minnesota Buddhist Vihara, a Theravāda monastery located in Minneapolis.

=== Christian ===
- Saint Benedict's Monastery, a Benedictine monastery located in St. Joseph.
- Saint Brigid of Kildare Monastery, a Methodist monastery located in St. Joseph.
- Saint John's Abbey, Collegeville, a Benedictine monastery located in Collegeville Township.

== Mississippi ==
=== Buddhist ===
- Magnolia Grove Monastery, a Plum Village Tradition monastery located in Batesville.

== Missouri ==
=== Christian ===
- Assumption Abbey, a Roman Catholic monastery located in Ava.
- Benedictines of Mary, Queen of Apostles, a Benedictine monastery located in Gower.
- Benedictine Sisters of Perpetual Adoration, a Benedictine monastery located in Clyde.
- Conception Abbey, a Benedictine monastery located in Conception.
- Saint Louis Abbey, a Benedictine monastery located in Creve Coeur.
- St. Pachomious Monastery, an Eastern Orthodox monastery located in Greenfield.
- Holy Archangel Michael and All Angels Skete, are two Serbian Orthodox monastic institutions, Weatherby, Missouri. that are sharing 80-acre agricultural land with two other monasteries:
- St. Xenia Sisterhood, a Serbian Orthodox women's monastery, Weatherby, Missouri and
- The Protection of the Virgin Mary, a Serbian Orthodox women's monastery, also in Weatherby, Missouri

== Nebraska ==
=== Christian ===
- Christ the King Priory, a Benedictine monastery located in Schuyler.
- Mount Michael Abbey, a Benedictine monastery in Omaha.

== New Hampshire ==
=== Christian ===
- Saint Anselm Abbey, a Benedictine monastery located in Goffstown.

== New Jersey ==
=== Buddhist ===
- Empty Cloud Monastery, a non-sectarian Buddhist monastery located in West Orange.

=== Christian ===
- The Monastery and Church of Saint Michael the Archangel, a Roman Catholic monastery in Union City that closed in 1980.
- Monastery of the Dominican Sisters of the Perpetual Rosary, a Roman Catholic monastery located in Union City.
- Newark Abbey, a Benedictine monastery located in Newark.
- St. Paul's Abbey, a Benedictine monastery located near Newton.

== New Mexico ==
=== Christian ===
- Monastery of Christ in the Desert, a Benedictine monastery located in Abiquiú.
- Monastery of the Holy Archangel Michael, an Eastern Orthodox monastery in the Orthodox Church in America in Cañones.
- Santa Maria de la Vid, a Norbertine monastery located in Albuquerque

== New York ==
=== Buddhist ===
- Blue Cliff Monastery, an Order of Interbeing monastery located in Pine Bush.
- Chuang Yen Monastery, a non-sectarian Buddhist monastery located in Kent.
- Dai Bosatsu Zendo Kongo-ji, a Rinzai monastery located in Livingston Manor.
- Karma Triyana Dharmachakra, a Tibetan Buddhist monastery located in Woodstock.
- New York Mahayana Temple, a non-sectarian Buddhist monastery located in South Cairo.
- Zen Mountain Monastery, a Mountains and Rivers Order monastery located in Mount Tremper.

=== Christian ===
- Abbey of the Genesee, a Roman Catholic monastery located in Piffard.
- Corpus Christi Monastery, a Roman Catholic monastery located in New York City.
- Holy Ascension Monastery, a Greek Old Calendarist monastery located in Bearsville.
- Holy Cross Monastery, an Anglican monastery located in West Park.
- Holy Trinity Monastery, an Eastern Orthodox monastery located in Jordanville.
- Mount Saviour Monastery, a Benedictine monastery located in Pine City.
- New Skete, an Eastern Orthodox monastery located in Cambridge.
- Novo-Diveevo Convent, an Eastern Orthodox monastery located in Nanuet.

== North Carolina ==
=== Buddhist ===
- Wat Carolina Buddhajakra Vanaram, a Thai Buddhist monastery located in Bolivia.

=== Christian ===
- Belmont Abbey, a Benedictine monastery located in Belmont.

== North Dakota ==
=== Christian ===
- Assumption Abbey, a Benedictine monastery located in Richardton.

== Ohio ==
=== Christian ===
- Holy Cross Monastery and Church, a Roman Catholic monastery located in Cincinnati that closed in 1977.
- St. Andrew Abbey, a Benedictine monastery located in Cleveland.
- St. Mark Serbian Orthodox Monastery, an Eastern Orthodox monastery located in Sheffield.
- St. Paul's Episcopal Church, a Roman Catholic monastery located in Cleveland.
- Monastery Marcha, a Serbian Orthodox monastery, located at 20 West 26th Street in Richfield, Ohio

== Oklahoma ==
=== Christian ===
- Clear Creek Abbey, a Benedictine monastery located in Hulbert.
- St. Gregory's Abbey, a Benedictine monastery located in Shawnee.

== Oregon ==
=== Christian ===
- Monastery of Our Lady of Jordan, a Roman Catholic monastery located in Jordan that closed in 1910.
- Monastery of the Precious Blood, a Roman Catholic monastery located in Montavilla, Portland.
- Mount Angel Abbey, a Benedictine monastery located in Saint Benedict.
- Our Lady of Guadalupe Trappist Abbey, a Roman Catholic monastery located in Lafayette.

== Pennsylvania ==
=== Christian ===
- Benedictine Sisters of Elk County, a Benedictine monastery located in St. Marys that closed in 2014.
- Daylesford Abbey, a Roman Catholic monastery located in Paoli.
- Saint Emma Monastery, a Benedictine monastery located in Greensburg.
- Saint Vincent Archabbey, a Benedictine monastery located in Latrobe.
- Holy Ascension Serbian Orthodox Monastery, 24 North Third Street, Youngwood, Pennsylvania.

== Rhode Island ==
=== Christian ===
- Portsmouth Abbey, a Benedictine monastery located in Narragansett Bay.

== South Carolina ==
=== Christian ===
- Mepkin Abbey, a Roman Catholic monastery located in Moncks Corner.

== South Dakota ==
=== Christian ===
- Blue Cloud Abbey, a Benedictine monastery located in Marvin that closed in 2012.

== Tennessee ==
=== Christian ===
- Orthodox Monastery of the Mother of God, Joy of All Who Sorrow, an Eastern Orthodox monastery located in Monteagle.

== Texas ==
=== Buddhist ===
- American Bodhi Center, a non-sectarian Buddhist monastery located in Houston.
- Jade Buddha Temple, a non-sectarian Buddhist monastery located in Houston.

=== Christian ===
- Carmelite Monastery, a Roman Catholic monastery in Stanton.
- Monastery of Our Lady of Charity, a Roman Catholic monastery in San Antonio which has since closed.
- Our Lady of Dallas Abbey, a Roman Catholic monastery located in Irving.
- St. Mary & St. Moses Abbey Monastery, Coptic Orthodox, Sandia, TX,

== Utah ==
=== Christian ===
- Abbey of Our Lady of the Holy Trinity, a Roman Catholic monastery located in Huntsville which closed in 2017.

- Carmel of the Immaculate Heart of Mary Monastery, in Holladay. The Carmelite nuns originally took residence downtown Salt Lake City, in December 1952 and then moved to Holladay, three years later. After their move to Holladay, it took another 20 years before the physical monastery began to be built.

== Vermont ==
=== Buddhist ===
- Karmê Chöling, a Shambhala monastery located in Barnet.

=== Christian ===
- Charterhouse of the Transfiguration, a Roman Catholic monastery located in Sandgate.
- Weston Priory, a Benedictine monastery located in Weston.

== Virginia ==
=== Christian ===
- Holy Cross Abbey, a Roman Catholic monastery located in Berryville.
- Our Lady of the Angels Monastery, a Roman Catholic monastery located in Crozet.
- Our Lady of Good Hope Monastery, an Anglican Catholic Church monastery, located in Montross.

== Washington ==
=== Buddhist ===
- Sravasti Abbey, a Tibetan Buddhist monastery located in Newport.
- Clear Mountain Monastery, an incipient Theravāda Buddhist Monastery outside of Seattle.

== Washington, D.C. ==
=== Christian ===
- Franciscan Monastery of the Holy Land in America, a Roman Catholic monastery located in Washington, D.C.
- Georgetown Visitation Monastery, a Roman Catholic monastery located in Washington, D.C.
- Saint Anselm's Abbey (Washington, D.C.), a Benedctine monastery located in Washington, D.C.

== West Virginia ==
=== Christian ===
- Holy Cross Monastery, an Eastern Orthodox monastery located in Wayne.

== Wisconsin ==
=== Buddhist ===
- Deer Park Buddhist Center and Monastery, a Tibetan Buddhist monastery located in Oregon.

=== Christian ===
- Benedictine Women of Madison, a Benedictine monastery located in Middleton.
- Our Lady of Spring Bank Abbey, a Roman Catholic monastery located in Oconomowoc that closed in 2011.
- Solus Christi Brothers, an Eastern Orthodox monastery in Milwaukee.
- St. Benedict's Abbey, a Benedictine monastery in Benet Lake.
- St. Mary of the Angels Church and Monastery, a Roman Catholic monastery in Green Bay.
- St. Norbert Abbey, a Roman Catholic monastery located in De Pere.
