= Wat Pasantidhamma =

Buddhist Temple in Virginia

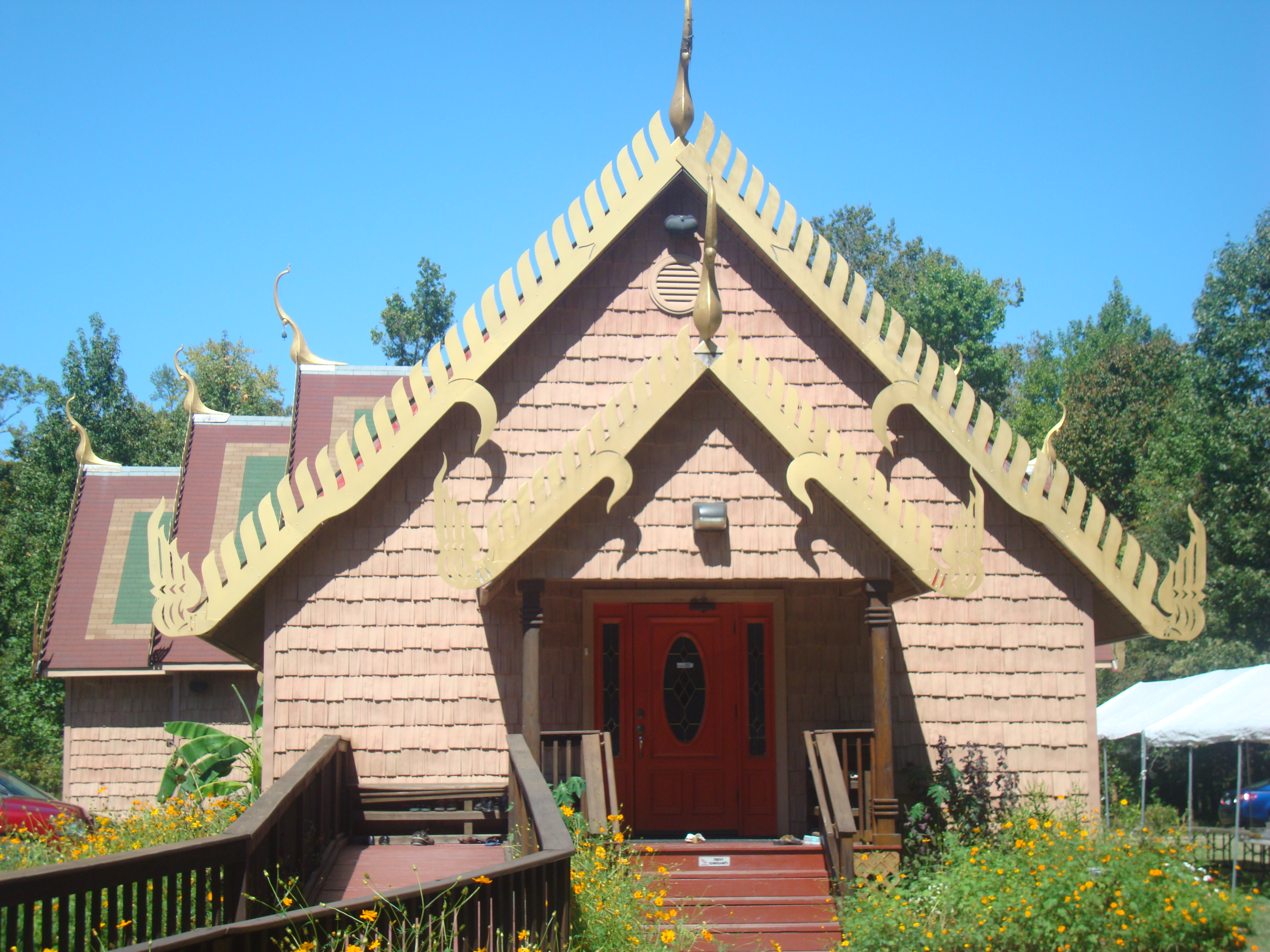

Religion
- Affiliation: Thai Theravada Buddhism
- Status: Active

Location
- Location: Carrollton, Virginia, United States
- State: Virginia
- Interactive map of Wat Pasantidhamma
- Coordinates: 36°56′35.7″N 76°34′29.3″W

Website
- gowatpa.org

Wat Pasantidhamma (Thai: วัดป่าสันติธรรม, or "Wat Pa"), meaning "a peaceful temple in the woods", is a Thai Theravada Buddhist temple located at 14289 Chapmans Lane in rural Carrollton, Virginia. It is a non-profit religious organization serving the Thai and Thai American communities. Established as the first Buddhist temple in the Tidewater (southeastern) region of Virginia in 1998, it remains as of 2010 one of three in the State.

== See also ==
- Abhayagiri Buddhist Monastery, Redwood Valley, California
- San Fran Dhammaram Temple, San Francisco
- Vajiradhammapadip Temple, Centereach and Mount Vernon in New York
- Wat Boston Buddha Vararam, Bedford, Massachusetts
- Wat Buddhananachat of Austin, Del Valle, Texas
- Wat Buddhasamakeevanaram, Bossier City, Louisiana
- Wat Buddhanusorn, Fremont, California
- Wat Carolina Buddhajakra Vanaram, Bolivia, North Carolina
- Wat Florida Dhammaram, Kissimmee, Florida
- Wat Mettāvarānaṁ, Valley Center, California
- Wat Mongkolratanaram, Berkeley, California
- Wat Mongkolratanaram, Tampa, Florida
- Wat Nawamintararachutis, Raynham, Massachusetts
