= Wat Mongkolratanaram =

Thai Buddhist temple in Berkeley, California, US

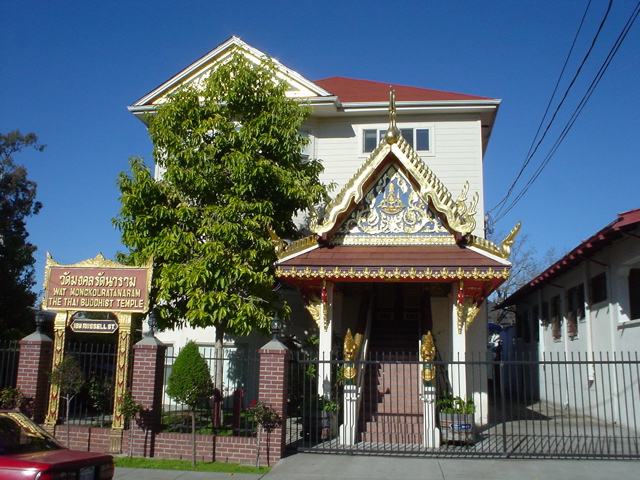

- Location within California

Religion
- Affiliation: Buddhism

Location
- Location: 1911 Russell St, Berkeley, California
- Country: United States
- Interactive map of Wat Mongkolratanaram
- Coordinates: 37°51′22.69″N 122°16′14.46″W

Wat Mongkolratanaram (Thai: วัดมงคลรัตนาราม) is a small Thai Buddhist temple located in Berkeley, California. A wat, it mainly attracts Thai American Buddhists, many of whom are students at the University of California, Berkeley, but it also draws in many local, non-Buddhists who come searching for the authentic Thai food public brunch on Sundays or attend its frequent cultural events. The temple is home to a Thai school for San Francisco Bay Area youth, as well as Berkeley's Thai Cultural Center.

In 2001, it marked 25 years of being a temple by completing renovations to its Victorian-era building to adapt the architecture to temple style.

In February 2009, a group of neighbors sought to shut down the Sunday public brunch, citing litter and traffic. The Zoning Adjustments Board of Berkeley voted 8 to 1 to keep the Sunday brunch, and the board chair "praised the temple for being a positive influence" in the neighborhood. The brunch runs on donations; visitors pay for tokens and exchange them for dishes.

The Thai-born Ajahn Manat is the current abbot of Wat Mongkolratanaram.

In 1997, the temple was home to the East Bay chapter of the Cypherpunks.

== See also ==
- Abhayagiri Buddhist Monastery, Redwood Valley, California
- San Fran Dhammaram Temple, San Francisco
- Vajiradhammapadip Temple, Centereach and Mount Vernon in New York
- Wat Boston Buddha Vararam, Bedford, Massachusetts
- Wat Buddhananachat of Austin, Del Valle, Texas
- Wat Buddhasamakeevanaram, Bossier City, Louisiana
- Wat Buddhanusorn, Fremont, California
- Wat Carolina Buddhajakra Vanaram, Bolivia, North Carolina
- Wat Florida Dhammaram, Kissimmee, Florida
- Wat Mettāvarānaṁ, Valley Center, California
- Wat Mongkolratanaram, Tampa, Florida
- Wat Nawamintararachutis, Raynham, Massachusetts
- Wat Pasantidhamma, Carrollton, Virginia
- Buddhism in the United States
