= Wat Nawamintararachutis =

Coordinates: 41°53′43.8″N 71°2′0.1″W

- วัดนวมินทรราชูทิศ
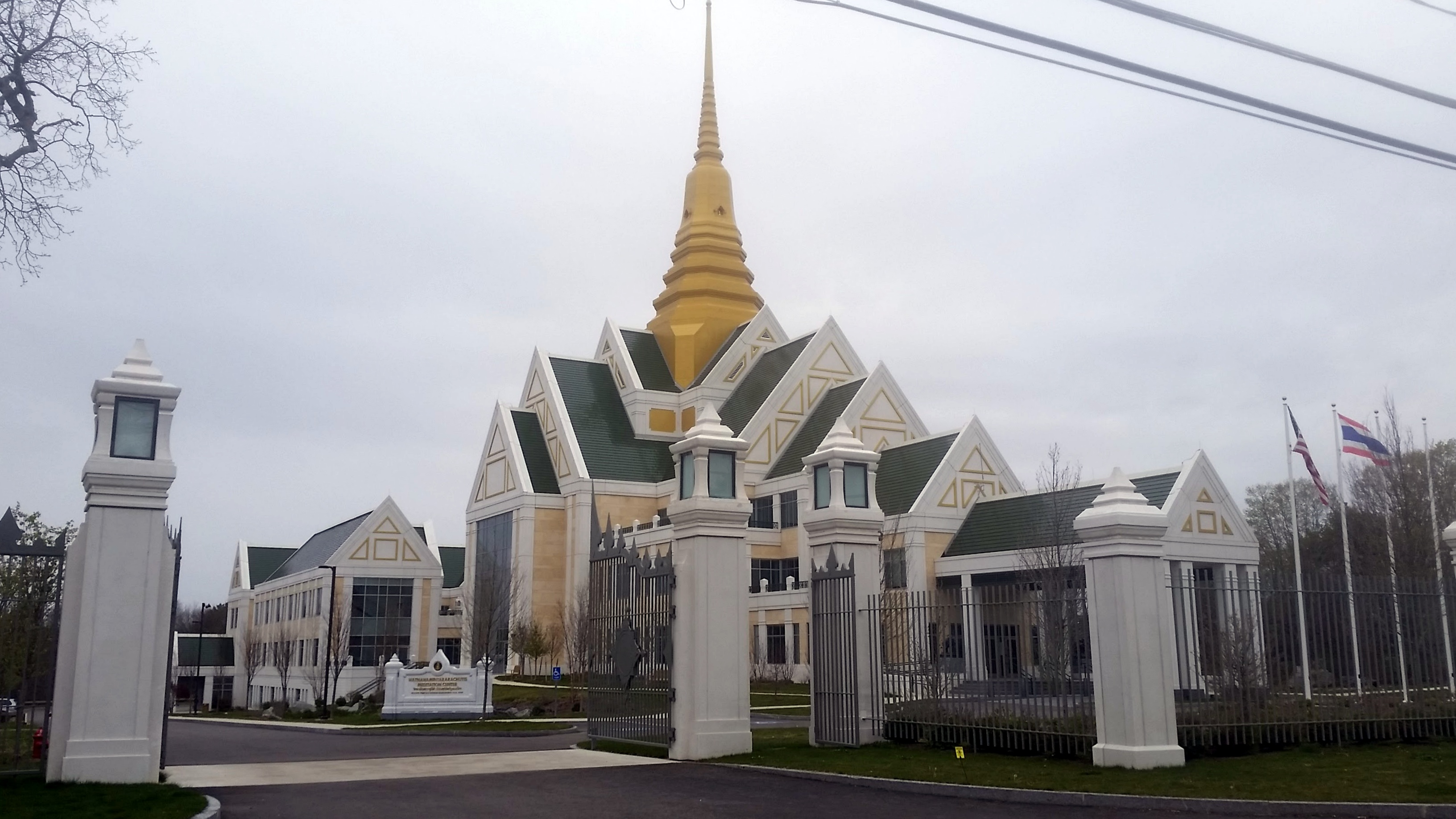

Religion
- Sect: Thai Buddhism

Location
- Location: 382 South Street, Raynham, MA
- Interactive map of Wat Nawamintararachutis

Architecture
- Architect: Been Z. Wang
- Founder: Phra Promwachirayan
- Funded by: Government of Thailand and private donations
- Groundbreaking: 2011
- Completed: 2014
- Construction cost: $60 million

Specifications
- Capacity: 700
- Site area: 110,000 square feet

Wat Nawamintararachutis (Thai: วัดนวมินทรราชูทิศ) is a working Thai Theravada Buddhist temple or "wat" in Raynham, Massachusetts, which is about 45 minutes south of Boston, Massachusetts, USA. It is one of only a handful of Thai Buddhist temples in the United States with actual Thai Buddhist monks in residence. Constructed on 35 acres (140,000 m^{2}) previously occupied by a farm, it opened its doors to the public in June 2014. It is one of two Thai temples in Massachusetts; the other one is Wat Boston Buddha Vararam.

== History ==
The ground breaking ceremony for the temple took place on 5–6 May 2011. Construction was scheduled to start late June – July 2011. The 110,000 square-foot temple was opened to the public in June 2014.

== Description ==
The temple was designed by architect Been Z. Wang and features limestone from Jerusalem, concrete panels from Canada, Ludowici clay roof tiles, and statues and light ornaments from Thailand. The temple can hold 700 people in the main worship space, and includes community rooms and lodging for monks and visitors, and a museum dedicated to King Bhumibol Adulyadej. A 4,000 lb statue of Buddha was placed in the building after completion.

The temple was named Wat Nawamin in honor of King Rama IX of Thailand, who was born on December 5, 1927 near Boston, in Cambridge, Massachusetts, USA (at the Mount Auburn Hospital). At the time, the king's father lived in Brookline, Massachusetts and was a medical student at Harvard Medical School.

The temple is considered to be the largest Thai Buddhist meditation center outside Thailand.

== See also ==
- Abhayagiri Buddhist Monastery, Redwood Valley, California
- San Fran Dhammaram Temple, San Francisco
- Vajiradhammapadip Temple, Centereach and Mount Vernon in New York
- Wat Boston Buddha Vararam, Bedford, Massachusetts
- Wat Buddhananachat of Austin, Del Valle, Texas
- Wat Buddhasamakeevanaram, Bossier City, Louisiana
- Wat Buddhanusorn, Fremont, California
- Wat Carolina Buddhajakra Vanaram, Bolivia, North Carolina
- Wat Florida Dhammaram, Kissimmee, Florida
- Wat Mettāvarānaṁ, Valley Center, California
- Wat Mongkolratanaram, Berkeley, California
- Wat Mongkolratanaram, Tampa, Florida
- Wat Pasantidhamma, Carrollton, Virginia
- Buddhism in the United States
