= New Orleans Zen Temple =

Zen dojo in Louisiana, US

Coordinates: 29°56′44.9″N 90°6′16″W

The New Orleans Zen Temple is a dojo of the Soto Zen tradition in New Orleans, Louisiana. Robert Livingston was the abbot until his retirement in 2016, and Richard Collins is the current abbot. Livingston, a close disciple of Taisen Deshimaru, founded the American Zen Association in 1983. Before his death in 1982, Deshimaru asked Livingston to go to the United States to open a Zen dojo and teach true Zen practice in the United States. After running multiple dojos across Uptown New Orleans throughout the 1980s, Livingston opened the New Orleans Zen Temple in 1991 at 748 Camp Street in the Arts District, where it operated for thirty years. After two location changes and a temporary closure, the New Orleans Zen Temple reopened on January 1, 2023 at 8338 Oak Street. The temple is also the home of the American Zen Association, which gives support to zen dojos and publishes rare Buddhist texts.

== Lineage ==
The lineage of the New Orleans Zen Temple is as follows:

- Kodo Sawaki (1880-1965): Born in Japan. Sawaki was the teacher of Taisen Deshimaru.
- Taisen Deshimaru (1914-1982): Born in the Saga Prefecture of Kyushu. Deshimaru founded the Association Zen Internationale in France.
- Robert Livingston (1933-2021): A disciple of Taisen Deshimaru. Livingston was the founding abbot of the New Orleans Zen Temple from 1983 to 2016.
- Richard Collins (1952- ): Collins received his monastic ordination in 2010 and his shiho in 2016 after Livingston's retirement in 2016. Collins is the second and current abbot of the temple.

== See also ==
- Timeline of Zen Buddhism in the United States
- List of Buddhist Temples in the United States
