= Lhundub Sopa =

Tibetan monk

Lhundub Sopa (born Tsang, 1923 – August 28, 2014) was a Tibetan monk.

== Biography ==
Sopa was born in Tibet. He became a novice monk and entered Gaden Chokor Monastery in 1932. In 1941, he joined Sera Monastery in Lhasa. He was chosen as one of the Dalai Lama's debate examiners during the annual Prayer Festival in 1959.

Geshe Sopa went in exile in India following the 1959 Tibetan uprising. In 1962, he was awarded the degree of Lharampa Geshe. At the request of Tenzin Gyatso, 14th Dalai Lama, he moved to the US with three other monks (Sharpa Tulku, Khamlung Tulku and Lama Kunga) that same year to learn English and to study American culture.

In 1967, Sopa was invited by Richard Robinson to join the faculty of the pioneer Buddhist Studies Program at the University of Wisconsin–Madison. Sopa was the first Tibetan to be tenured at an American university. Holding various positions through the years, when he retired in 1997, he became Emeritus Professor in the Department of South Asian Studies. During that time, Sopa trained many of the first generation of respected Buddhist scholars and translators in the US, including Jeffrey Hopkins, José Cabezón, John Makransky, Edward W. Bastian, and Zorba Paster.

To meet the request of students for Buddhist teachings, Sopa founded the Deer Park Buddhist Center in Oregon, Wisconsin in 1976. The Kalachakra Tantra initiation was given in the West for the first time at Deer Park July, 1981.

He was a trustee on the International Committee for Peace Council.

Sopa died of natural causes at Deer Park Buddhist Center in August 2014, age 92.

== Bibliography ==
- Cutting through appearances: Practice and Theory of Tibetan Buddhism, co-authored with Jeffrey Hopkins
- Wheel of Time: the Kalachakra in Context, co-authored with Roger Jackson and John Newman
- Peacock in the Poison Grove: Two Buddhists Texts for Training the Mind
- Steps on the Path to Enlightenment: A Commentary on the Lamrim Chenmo
  - Volume 1: The Foundation Practices
  - Volume II Karma
  - Volume III Way of the Bodhisattva
  - Volume IV Śamatha
  - Volume V Insight
- Teachings from Tibet: Guidance from Great Lamas, co-authored
- Like a Waking Dream: the Autobiography of Geshe Lhundrub Sopa
- The Crystal Mirror of Philosophical Systems: A Tibetan Study of Asian Religious Thought
