= Passionist Fathers Monastery =

- U.S. National Register of Historic Places
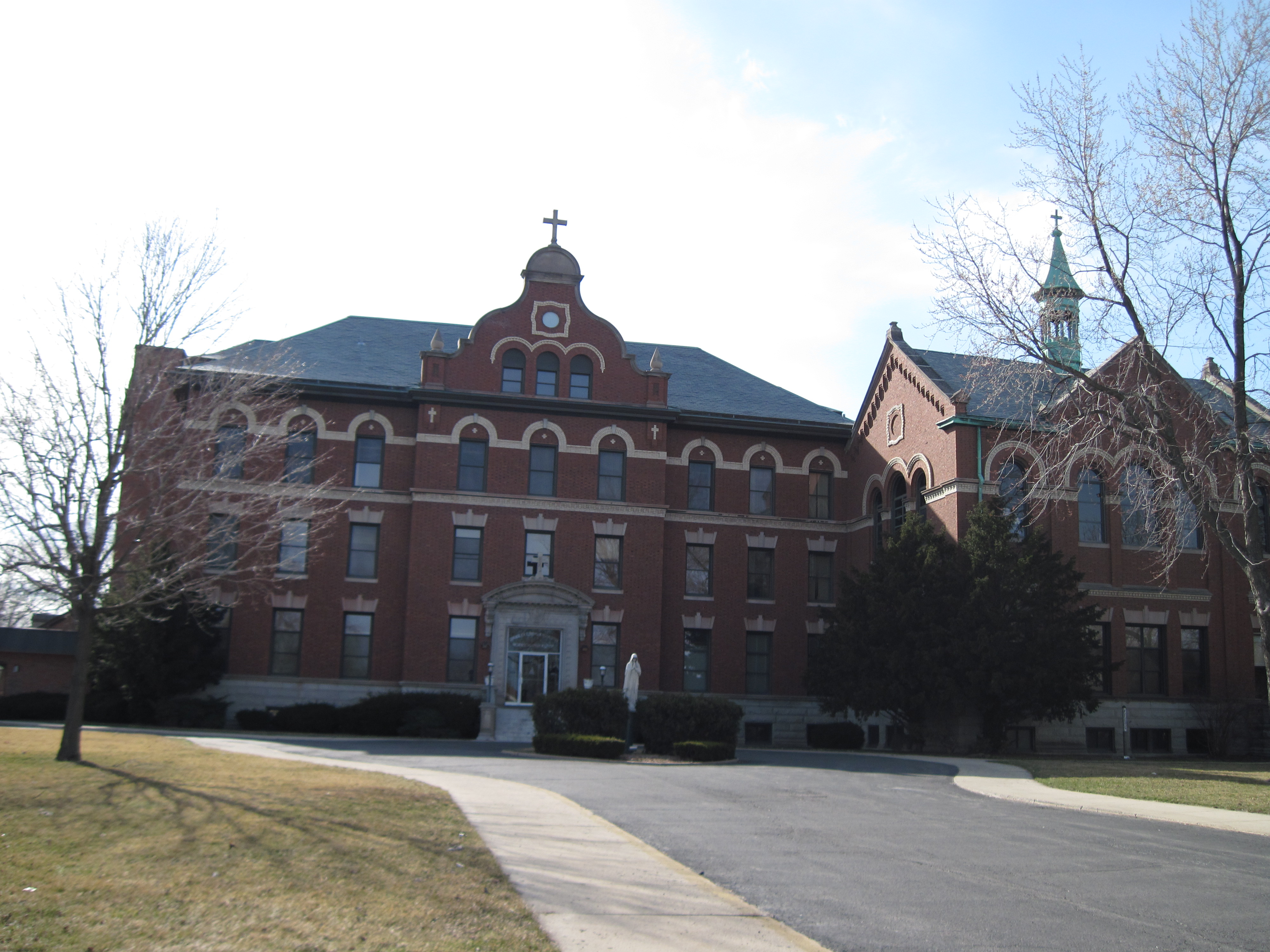

- Location within Chicago metropolitan area Location within Illinois Location within the United States
- Location: 5700 N. Harlem Ave., Chicago, Illinois
- Coordinates: 41°59′07″N 87°48′30″W
- Area: 4.3 acres (1.7 ha)
- Built: 1910
- Architect: Joseph Molitor
- Architectural style: Classical Revival, Baroque Revival, Romanesque Revival
- NRHP reference No.: 13000048
- Added to NRHP: March 6, 2013

The Passionist Fathers Monastery is a historic monastery at 5700 N. Harlem Avenue in the Norwood Park neighborhood of Chicago, Illinois. The monastery was built in 1910 for the Passionists, an order of Roman Catholic monks which believed in austere living and hosting spiritual retreats. Architect Joseph Molitor, who also designed several churches for the Archdiocese of Chicago in the early twentieth century, designed the monastery. The building incorporates elements of Classical Revival, Baroque Revival, and Romanesque Revival architecture. The building's most prominent Classical Revival element its main entrance, which includes a balustrade and detailed pediment. Its Baroque influence is apparent in the Dutch gable above the main entrance, while its rounded arched windows and corbeling come from the Romanesque style.

The monastery was added to the National Register of Historic Places on March 6, 2013.
