= Chua Buu Mon =

Buddhist temple in Port Arthur, Texas

Coordinates: 29.889295°N 93.918804°W

Religion
- Affiliation: Theravada

Location
- Location: 2701 Proctor Street, Port Arthur, TX 77640
- Country: United States
- Interactive map of Chua Buu Mon

Architecture
- Completed: August 15, 1987

Website
- www.facebook.com/buumonbuddhisttemple/

Chua Buu Mon is a Buddhist temple located on Proctor Street in Port Arthur, Texas.

== Summary ==
Leader/title: Most Venerable Huyen Viet Ethnic composition: mostly Vietnamese, with a growing non-Vietnamese population Resident nonks: Rev. Huyen Viet, Abbot, Rev. Bui Thanh Nhan (Thich Tri Quang), and Bhante Kassapa Bhikkhu, Assistant Abbot. Tradition: Theravada

== Activities and schedule ==
The temple holds regular services in Vietnamese at 11 a.m. on Sundays and English on Sundays at 2 p.m. with a Pali chanting class that follows the service at 3 p.m. Also, there is a weekly meditation class every Wednesday at 7 p.m. There are many festivals held throughout the year including the very popular and well visited Lotus Blossom Festival, which also is part of the Vesak celebration. During this celebration, the temple's well-known water gardens are visited by upwards of several thousand people over one weekend in early June.

== Demographics ==
The congregation consists of Vietnamese immigrants and their children. Since the meditation classes have started in February 2007, a medium-sized group of non-Vietnamese Americans have started attending regularly. This temple has the largest amount of non-Vietnamese speaking people in a Theravada Vietnamese Temple in the United States.

== Teachers ==
=== Bhante Kassapa Bhikkhu ===
He served in the U.S. Air Force during the Vietnam War. He then began his formal training in the Jesuit Associate Program in Houston. Eventually, Bhante Kassapa Bhikkhu joined the Franciscan order as a monk. When he left that order, he spent 16 years studying Buddhism while working in the Hillsborough County Aviation Authority in Tampa, Florida. He was ordained as a novice monk in October 2006 at Phat Phap Buddhist Temple in St. Petersburg, Florida. After one full year, he became a fully ordained bhikkhu at Buu Mon Buddhist Temple in Port Arthur, Texas.

Bhante Kassapa Bhikkhu is currently a resident monk at Buu Mon Buddhist Temple, a Theravada Vietnamese temple in Port Arthur, Texas. He is the chaplain to the Buddhist inmates at the minimum security federal correction facility in Beaumont, Texas. Since he took over the prison ministry from the previous chaplain, the attendance went from 7 inmates to 20 inmates and growing. He also runs a weekly meditation group that usually ranges from 20 to 40 people each week. He hopes to one day create an American-style Theravada Buddhist temple.

Averaging every six weeks, he also speaks at the Unity Church of Beaumont to their weekly meditation group. He gave one of the two keynote speeches at Oklahoma City University for the 10th Annual Oklahoma Buddhist Conference. Also, he spoke at the 2008 Human Rights Torch Relay Demonstration in Houston Texas, South East Texas World Peace Event in 2007, and a Lamar University World Religions course. Most recently, Bhante Kassapa Bhikkhu has appeared in a 3-minute special on the growth of Buddhism in America on the ABC affiliate, KTRK Channel 13, in Houston, Texas on November 16, 2008. He has also appeared on the live call in show, KFDM Listens, which aired on the CBS affiliate, KFDM Channel 6, in Beaumont, Texas. On October 20, 2009, he spoke to the Intercultural and Diversity class at McNeese University in Lake Charles, Louisiana. Bhante Kassapa has spoken numerous times to Lamar University in Beaumont Texas, and has been asked to lecture at McNeese University in Lake Charles LA.
