= Dominican Sisters of the Heart of Jesus =

Dominican monastery in Lockport, Louisiana

The Dominican Sisters of the Heart of Jesus are a contemplative Roman Catholic religious community and non-profit organization based in Lockport, Louisiana. They follow the Dominican tradition but operate independently from the officially recognized Second Order monasteries.

The sisters live a life of prayer, study, community and work in keeping with the Rule of Saint Augustine and Dominican spirituality. They profess the evangelical counsels of chastity, poverty and obedience through private, simple vows.

The community was founded in 1981 by Mother Mary Henry of Jesus, O.P., in Lockport, following her earlier participation in establishing the Dominican Monastery of the Infant Jesus in Lufkin, Texas.

== See also ==
- Dominican Order
- Dominican Nuns
