= Lake Superior Zendo =

Sōtō Zen Buddhist temple located in Marquette, Michigan, United States

Coordinates: 46.56926°N 87.39944°W

Lake Superior Zendo (LSV) is a Sōtō Zen Buddhist temple located in Marquette, Michigan. The zendo was founded in 1990 by Tesshin Paul Lehmberg, who received Dharma transmission from Rev. Shoken Winecoff of Ryumonji Zen Monastery. Lake Superior Zendo is informally affiliated with Northern Michigan University through the Presque Isle Zen Community and participates in local interfaith events.

== See also ==
- Zazen
