= Chùa Bồ Đề (Philadelphia) =

Coordinates: 39°56′14.4″N 75°09′54.2″W

Chùa Bồ Đề, also known as the Bồ Đề Buddhist Temple, is a Vietnamese Buddhist temple located in South Philadelphia, Pennsylvania.

The temple was established Christmas Day in 1994 after Vietnamese immigrants of the Asian American Buddhist Association of Philadelphia raised to $130,000 to purchase the abandoned Philadelphia Clef Club of Jazz. It is the first Vietnamese Buddhist temple in Philadelphia.

In 1995, a resident monk was murdered. The incident delayed renovations to the building until the end of 1997.
