= Cleveland Buddhist Temple =

Temple in Ohio, US

- Cleveland Buddhist Temple Ohio USA

Religion
- Affiliation: Jodo Shinshu Pure Land Buddhist Churches of America
- Leadership: Supervising Minister: Reverend Ronald Miyamura

Location
- Location: 21600 Shaker Blvd., Shaker Heights, OH 44122
- Country: USA
- Interactive map of Cleveland Buddhist Temple
- Coordinates: 41°34′16″N 81°31′50″W

Website
- www.cleveland-buddhist.org

The Cleveland Buddhist Temple is a Pure Land (Jodo Shinshu) community currently meeting at the Unitarian Universalist Congregation of Cleveland in Shaker Heights, Ohio. The current Supervising Minister is Rev. Ron Miyamura with the assistance of Tokudo Ministers. Cleveland Buddhist Temple is affiliated with the Buddhist Churches of America, which is part of the Nishi Hongwanji tradition headquartered in Kyoto, Japan

== History ==
Japanese-Americans founded the center in 1944 after being released from World War II Internment Camps. After the first temple was destroyed during the Hough Riots in 1966, it relocated to Euclid, OH in 1970, a suburb of Cleveland. After some decline, membership saw an increase after Koshin Ogui arrived at the temple as minister in 1977. He created a new group, Zen Shin Sangha, which helped increase the appeal of the temple. The Euclid building was sold in 2018, and the congregation's meetings and classes presently take place the weekend of the third Sunday of every month at space rented in the Unitarian Universalist Congregation of Cleveland in Shaker Heights.
