= Soshimza Zen Center =

Korean American Buddhist organization

Soshimsa Zen Center

Religion
- Affiliation: Seon, Korean Zen

Location
- Location: 398 Lincoln Blvd. Suite B-1; Middlesex, New Jersey
- Country: United States
- Interactive map of Soshimsa Zen Center
- Coordinates: 40°34′2″N 74°30′1.5″W

Architecture
- Founder: Il-Cho Dosamin
- Completed: CE 2009

Website
- soshimsa.org

Soshimsa Zen Center ( Hangul: 소심사 Hanja: 少心寺) is a U.S. Buddhist organization in New Jersey, affiliated with the Taego Order of Korean Seon.

== History ==
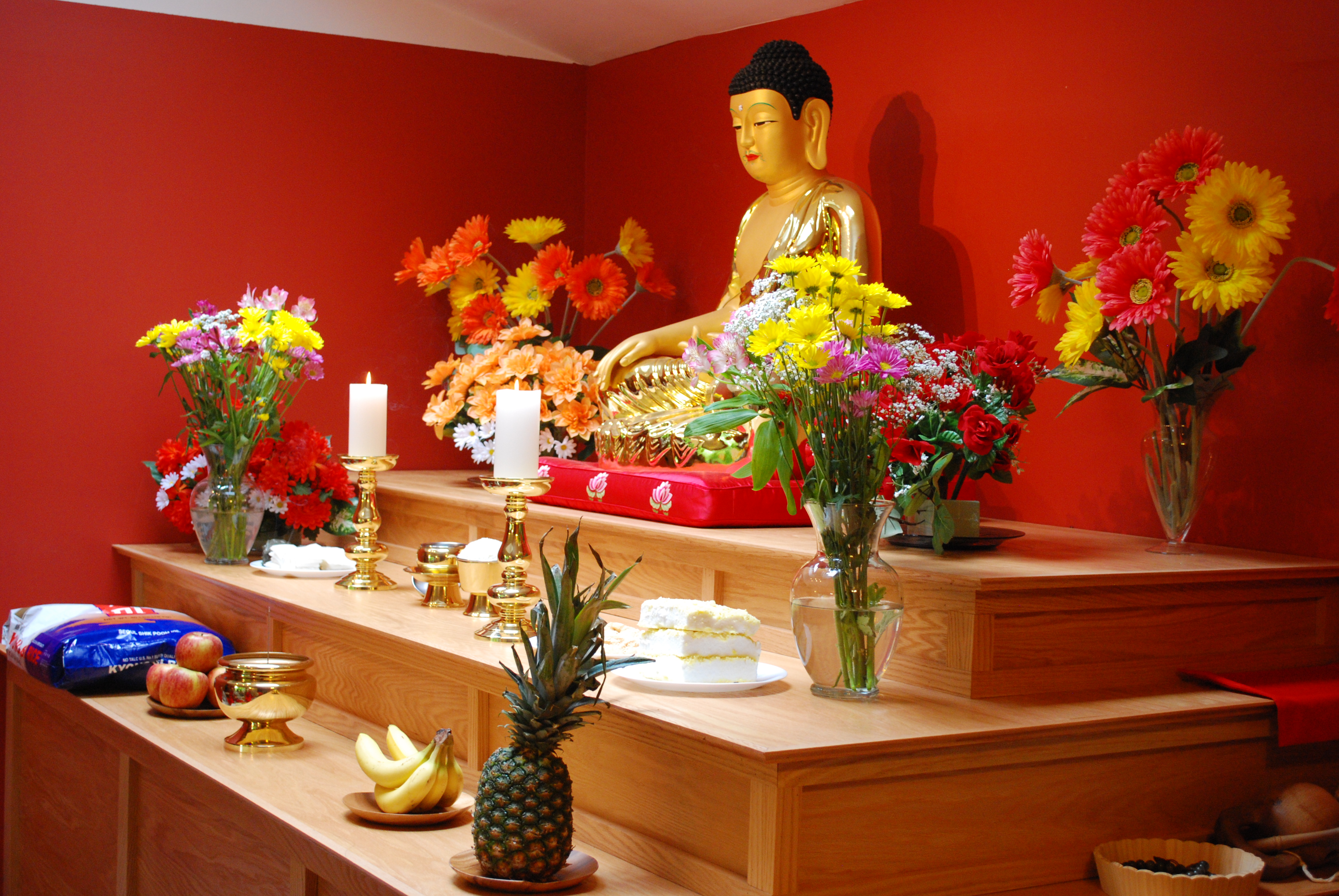
Buddha Hall

The organization was founded in May 2009, and is currently a 501(c)3 non profit charitable organization. Since 1975, when founder Ven. Il-Cho Dosanim (일초 도사님) came to United States, his mission has been to develop a temple in order to foster the teachings of Buddhism. Today, three of Ven. Il-Cho's disciples are the pillars that support So Shim Sa. Ven. Duhk-Song Sunim (덕성 스님) has studied under Ven. Il-Cho for over three decades and serves as the director of the center's outreach program, 1000 Hands. Elected as Director of Wellness Programs, and with a Doctorate in Clinical Psychology, Ven. Mooh-Sang Sunim (무상 스님) coordinates education and wellness programs offered at So Shim Sa. A disciple of Ven. Il-Cho since 1997 and ordained as a Buddhist monk in 2003, Ven. Myong-Ahn Sunim (명안 스님) serves as the appointed Abbot.

== Soshimsa Buddhist Fellowship ==
=== Fellowship Chapters ===
Soshimsa Buddhist Fellowship opened its first chapter as a campus chaplaincy at Rutgers University in September 2010. (Currently on pause). Ven. Myong-Ahn serves as the Chapter President.
