= Monastery of Mary, Mother of Grace =

Carmelite monastery in Lafayette, Louisiana

The Monastery of Mary, Mother of Grace, is a convent maintained by the Discalced Carmelites of the Roman Catholic Church. Founded in 1936 by the New Orleans Carmel, the monastery is located in Lafayette, Louisiana within the Diocese of Lafayette.

== Description ==
The monastery covers 11 acres (45,000 m^{2}) that include an organic garden, fruit trees, and a variety of plants and shrubs that contribute to the monastery's peaceful and meditative environment.

== Daily ritual ==
Nuns at Mary, Mother of Grace, pray several times each day, and attend Mass daily. They observe strict silence except at certain times, such as during Mass, when the nuns sing hymns. When they are not praying, the nuns share work duties, from gardening to cleaning to answering correspondence from around the globe. The nuns do not leave the monastery except for special reasons.
