= Sidney Center, New York =

- Hamlet
- Location within New York Location within the United States
- Coordinates: 42°17′26″N 75°15′21″W
- Country: United States
- State: New York
- County: Delaware
- Elevation: 1,299 ft (396 m)
- Time zone: UTC-5 (Eastern (EST))
  - Summer (DST): UTC-4 (EDT)
- ZIP code: 13839
- Area code: 607
- GNIS feature ID: 965213

Sidney Center is a hamlet in Delaware County, New York, United States. The community is 7.2 miles (11.6 km) east-southeast of the village of Sidney. Sidney Center has a post office with ZIP code 13839, which opened on March 29, 1839.
