= Chua Linh-Son Buddhist Temple =

Coordinates: 30.4145°N 97.7344°W

Chùa Linh-Sơn

Religion
- Affiliation: Mahayana; Vietnamese Buddhism

Location
- Location: 4604 Duval Rd., Austin, TX 78727
- Country: United States
- Interactive map of Chùa Linh-Sơn

Architecture
- Completed: 1998

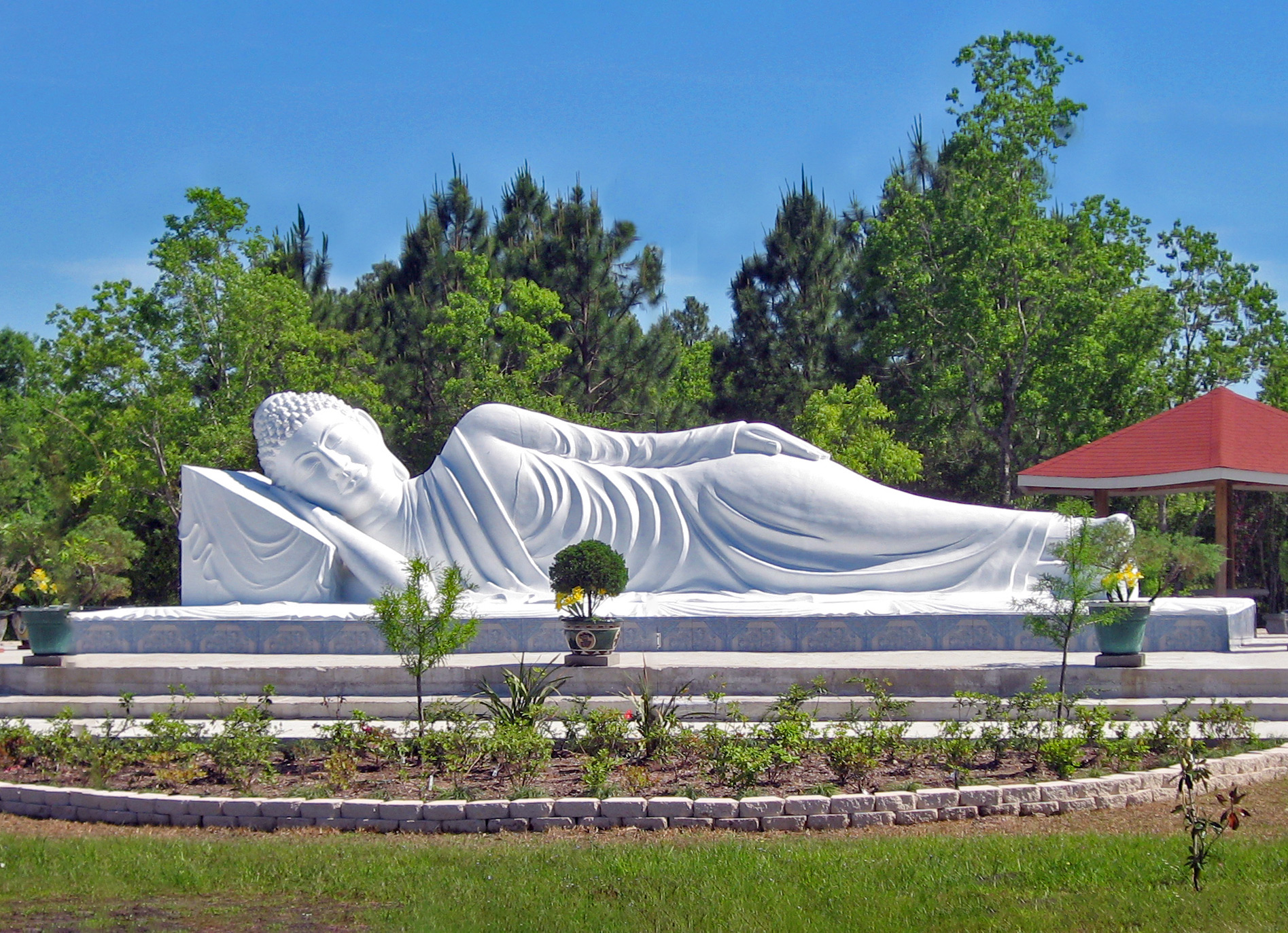
Reclining Buddha at Linh-Son Buddhist Temple

Chùa Linh-Sơn is a Buddhist Temple, located on 4604 Duval Rd. Austin, Texas.

== Quick Stats ==
- Leader/Title: Venerable Thich Tri-Hue
- Ethnic Composition: mostly Vietnamese, with a growing non-Vietnamese population
- Resident Monks: Venerable Thich Tri-Hue (abbot), Thich Hue-Minh (vice-abbot)
- Tradition: Mahayana

== Demographics ==
The community is predominantly Vietnamese, however, the temple is often visited by Chinese, Thais, Cambodians, Sri Lankans, Indians, and Westerners. Chanting services are conducted in Vietnamese. There are 3000-5000 Vietnamese Buddhists in Austin. There are about 200 students in the Vietnamese language and culture classes each week.

== Center activities ==
Major holidays at the Linh-Son temple include Tết Trung Thu, a mid-autumn moon festival, Vu Lan, a day honoring mothers that is similar to Mother's day in America, Tết Nguyên Đán, the Vietnamese New Year (a.k.a. Lunar New Year), and the Buddha's Birthday. Larger celebrations usually are held at the Leander temple which has more space to accommodate more people. The Linh-Son Buddhist Youth Association is very active and enjoys events such as cookouts and camping trips. The activities of this group are organized very much like Boy/Girl Scouts.
