= Buddhist Faith Fellowship of Connecticut =

Buddhist temple in Connecticut

The Buddhist Faith Fellowship is a non-denominational Buddhist Church, located in Middletown, Connecticut, situated in Middlesex County. It was founded in 2001. The Fellowship describes itself as an independent American Buddhist church 'tethered to the earliest Buddhist teachings and the spirit of boundless compassion of Shin Buddhism.

== Bibliography ==
- Payne, Richard K. (2009). Path No Path. Numata Center for Buddhist Translation & Rese; 1 edition. ISBN 1-886439-41-9
- Petersson, Margaret (2013) I Stumbled Upon a Jewel: A Collection of Essays by a Lay Sangha. AuthorHouse. ISBN 1-4817-5892-6.
- Hadley, Barbara (April 2012). The Growth of Buddhism in America. Unity Institute's Lyceum 2011 Spiritual Studies from a Global Perspective: The Ongoing East -West
