= Linh Quang Buddhist Center =

Coordinates: 40.7472°N 96.7654°W

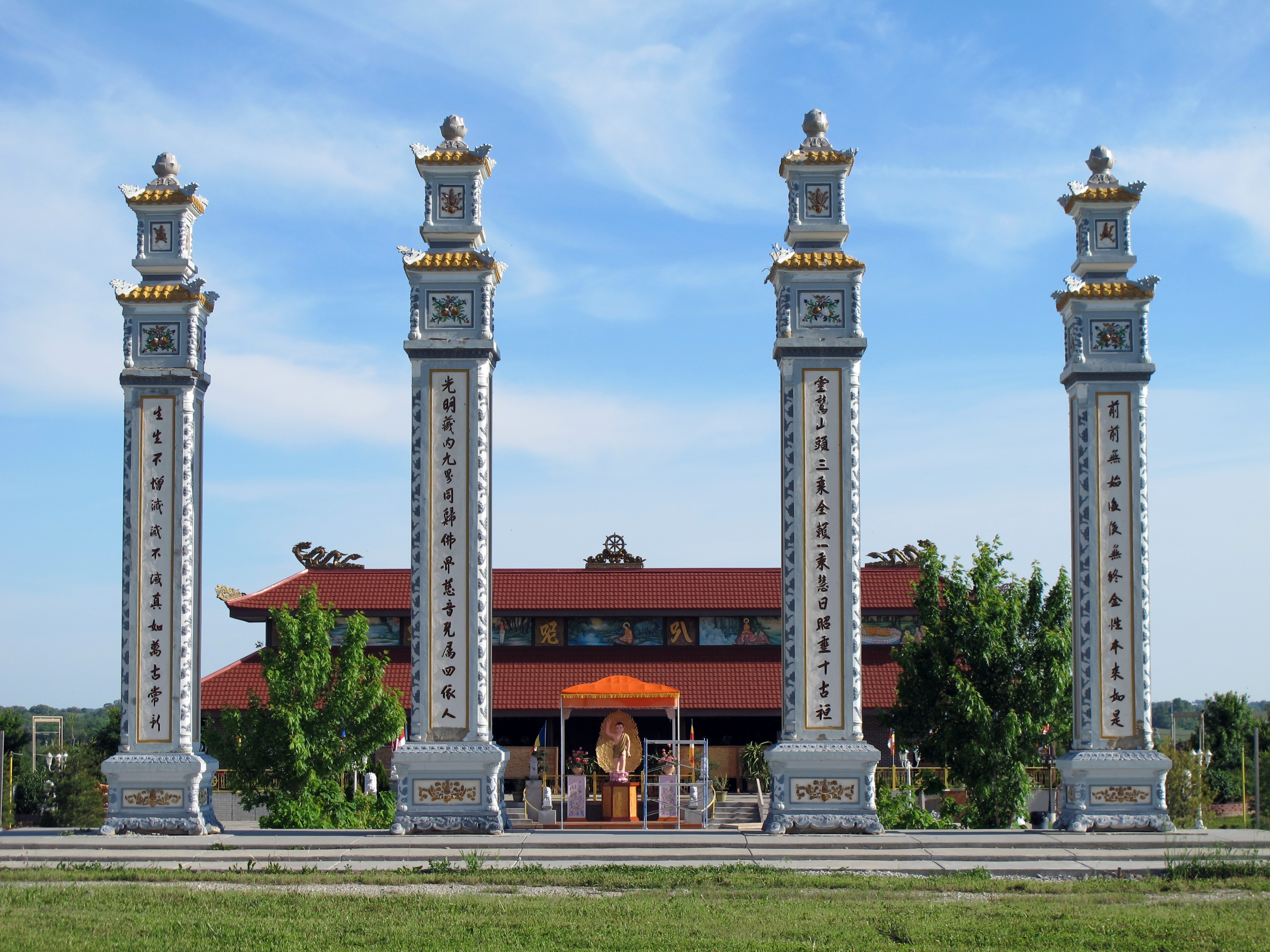
- Linh Quang Buddhist Center in 2011

Religion
- Affiliation: Buddhism

Location
- Location: 3175 W Pleasant Hill Rd, Lincoln, Nebraska 68523
- Country: United States of America
- Interactive map of Linh Quang Buddhist Center

Architecture
- Completed: 2011

The Linh Quang Buddhist Center is a Vietnamese Buddhist temple in Lincoln, Nebraska. The temple was established in downtown Lincoln in the early 1990s by Vietnamese families practicing Buddhism in a converted house. In 2007, a new temple would be built west of Lincoln, near Denton where the Linh Quang Buddhist Center would be relocated after one the temple's attendees donated his Powerball winnings. After 4 years, the newly built temple would later host a grand opening ceremony to the public in 2011. As of 2026, the temple is still up running and open to the public.
