= Chua Bo De =

Coordinates: 29.905804°N 89.976636°W

Location
- Location: New Orleans
- State: Louisiana
- Country: United States
- Interactive map of Chua Bo De

Architecture
- Established: 1983

Chua Bo De (Vietnamese: Chùa Bồ Đề) is a Vietnamese Buddhist temple in New Orleans, United States.

== History ==
The Chùa Bồ Đề temple was built in 1983. The monk who founded the temple had left the temple, and handed over the temple to another monk named Thích Thông Đức. The temple was only mildly affected by Hurricane Katrina, and in the storm's aftermath was used as a refuge site for people displaced by the storm and subsequent flooding. In 2012, Abbot Thông Đức left the temple in order to take care of his temple in Houston. There is no official abbot residing in the temple, there are only two female nuns that live in the temple and a monk that visit the temple every few weeks. The temple name "Bồ Đề" is a Vietnamese transcription of the Bodhi Tree's name, the tree that Buddha sat under when he reached enlightenment.

== Architecture and activities ==
The Chùa Bồ Đề temple is located on the Westbank in the Algiers neighborhood of New Orleans near English Turn. The temple reflects the features and decorations of traditional Vietnamese architecture. The area surrounding the temple is mostly undeveloped, but trimmed carefully with many benches. The main temple is a square building the size of a four-bedroom house. There are two guardian lions at the entrance to the temple.

The interior part of the temple consists of a large prayer room, a large room for classes and social events, a kitchen, and two small praying rooms for worship of ancestors and Quan Công (a Vietnamese name for Lord Guan). The temple has two attached living quarters for the resident monks.

The temple serves as a community center for the local Vietnamese community and a few non-Vietnamese. It holds regular services on Saturdays at 7:30 p.m. and Sundays at 11:00 a.m and other special Buddhist ceremonies such as Vesak. The temple also provides Vietnamese language and the Buddhist teaching classes for children on every Sunday.
