= Empty Cloud Monastery =

Buddhist monastery in West Orange, New Jersey

Coordinates: 39°21′39″N 123°14′00″W

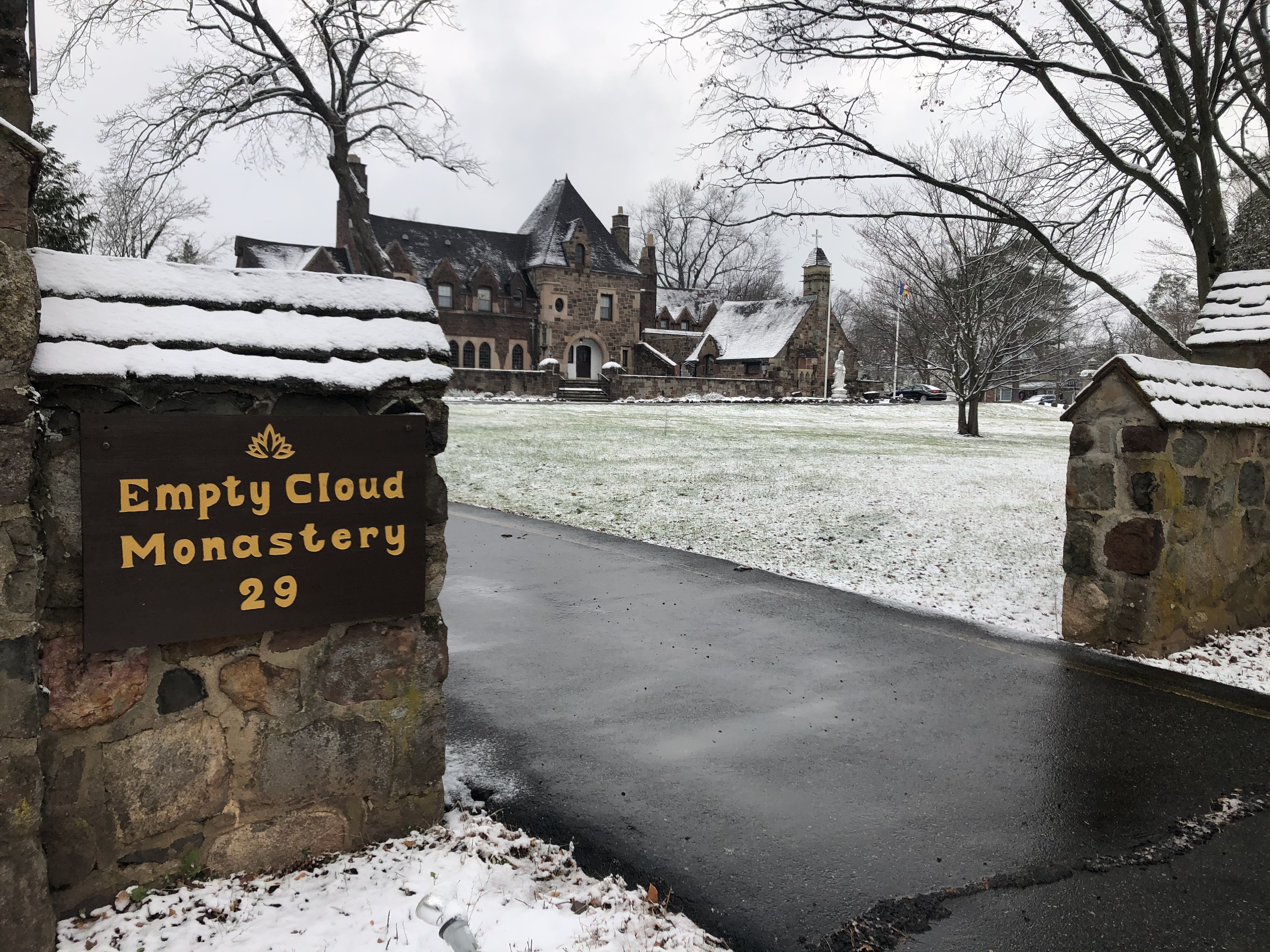
- View from the main gate of Empty Cloud in winter

Religion
- Affiliation: Buddhism
- Leadership: Ayyā Sobhana Abbot

Location
- Location: Empty Cloud Monastery 29 Ridgeway Ave West Orange, NJ 07052, United States
- Country: United States
- Interactive map of Empty Cloud Monastery

Architecture
- Completed: CR 2019

Website
- http://www.emptycloud.org/

Empty Cloud Monastery is a gender-inclusive, non-sectarian Buddhist monastery in West Orange, New Jersey, United States.

== Origins ==
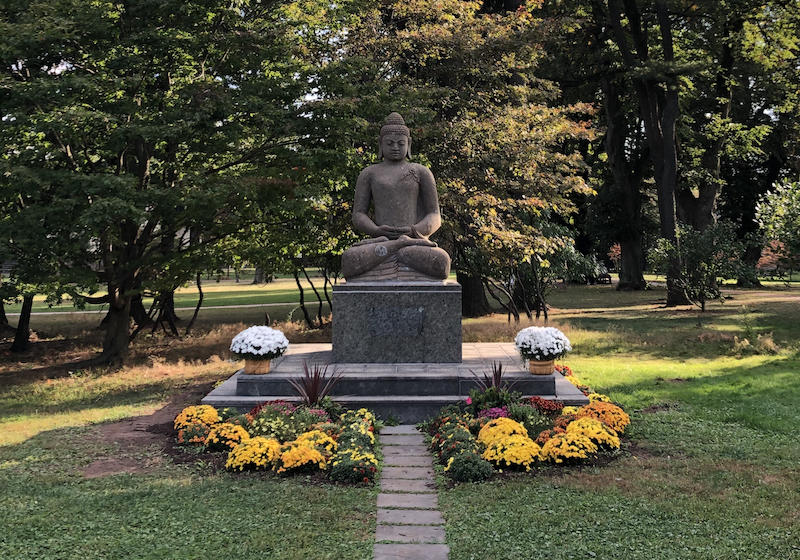
Buddha statue at Empty Cloud

Empty Cloud Monastery was co-founded in 2019 by Buddhist monks Ayyā Somā and Bhante Suddhāso, supported by their non-profit organization Buddhist Insights. The monastics were initially based out of a meditation center in Rockaway, Queens, New York City, but after a number of donations, the organization was able to secure the 3-acre (1.2 ha), century-old property, which was formerly a Catholic monastery.

== Lifestyle ==
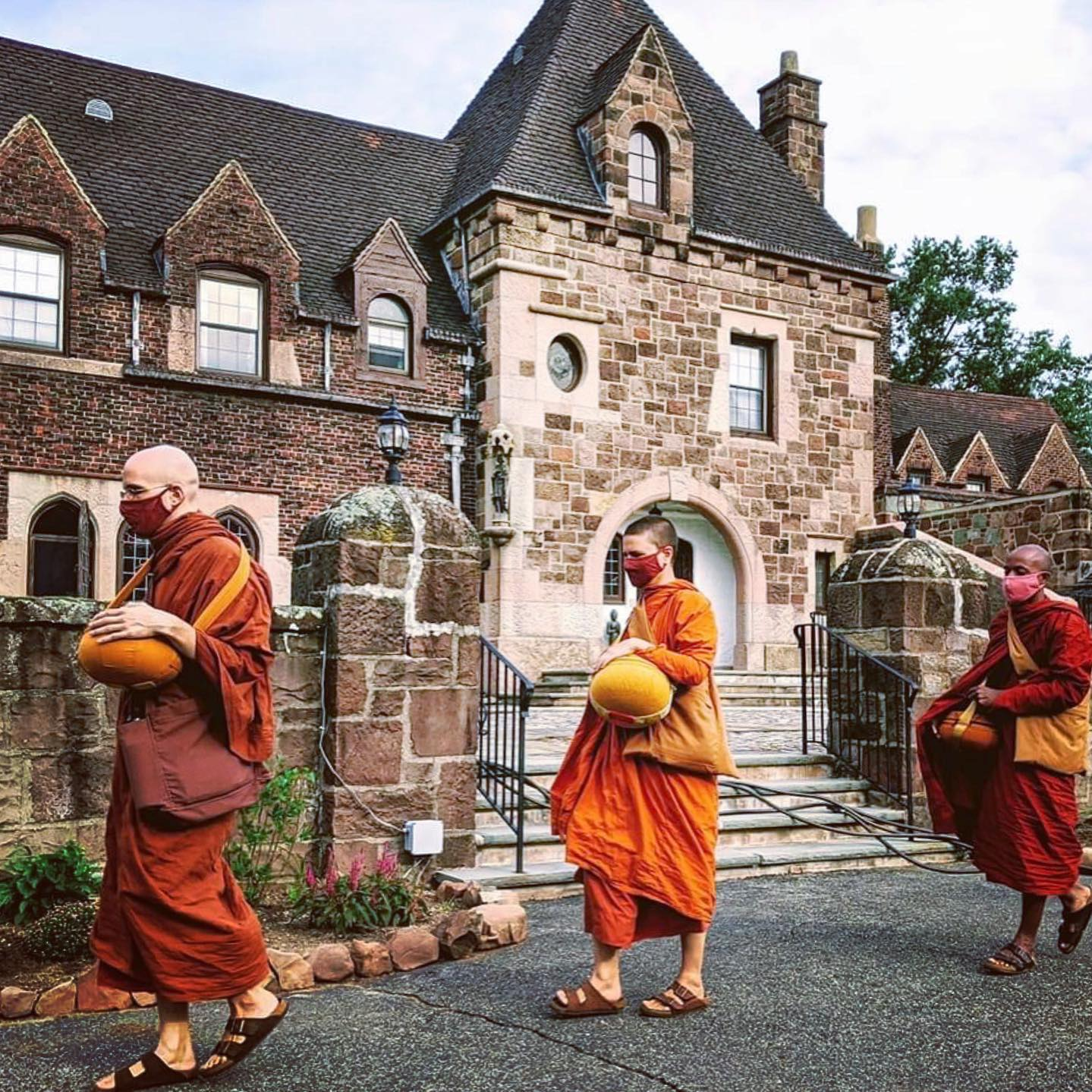
Bhante Suddhāso, Ayyā Somā, and another monk heading out for the weekly alms-round in West Orange in August 2020

Empty Cloud Monastery is a gender-inclusive monastery, therefore all of its residents, monastic and lay, practice alongside each other in a community setting, while residing in separate living quarters. The core focus of the monastery is to practice traditional Buddhist teachings while making them available free of charge to all those interested. The monastery regularly hosts retreats and residencies open to the public. Guest monastic teachers are routinely invited to teach, and previous teachers include Bhikkhu Bodhi, Khenmo Drolma, Ajahn Brahm, and other monastics of all genders from various traditions and lineages.

The daily schedule includes morning puja at 5:00 am with chanting in Pali and English, followed by 90 minutes of silent meditation. This is followed by a two hour work period. This can be anything from grounds-work outside, the cleaning the interior of the building. There is one meal at 9:00am, followed by cleanup. All lay residents follow the Eight precepts. The afternoon is reserved for personal practice. At 5 pm, tea is served, followed by a Dhamma talk and evening puja at 6:30 pm.

== See also ==
- Buddhism in the United States
- Buddhist monasticism
- Index of Buddhism-related articles
