= New York Mahayana Temples =

Chinese Buddhist temples in South Cairo, New York and Manhattan

Retreat Mahayana Temple

Religion
- Affiliation: Pure land

Location
- Location: 710 Ira Vail Rd, Leeds, NY 12451
- Country: United States
- Interactive map of Retreat Mahayana Temple
- Coordinates: 42.3119°N 73.9468°W

Architecture
- Founder: Mrs. Annie Ying
- Completed: 1962

Website
- http://www.mahayana.us

Mahayana Temple (Chinese: 大乘寺; pinyin: Dàchèng Sì; Jyutping: Da4sing4 Zi6) is a Chinese Buddhist temple organization headquartered within a forest in South Cairo, New York. It is the retreat of the Eastern States Buddhist Temple of America, Inc. ("ESBT"), whose downtown branch of the Mahayana Temple (a.k.a. Mahayana City Campus) is located in Chinatown, Manhattan. The original retreat land was donated by James Ying.

The temple grounds in South Cairo contain the Grand Buddha Hall (with dormitories located in the wings and a dining hall located on the lower level), the Kuan Yin Hall, the 500 Arhat Hall, the Seven Storied Jade Pagoda, the Earth Spirit Bodhisattva Hall, a three-unit temple dedicated to the spirits of the land, and an obelisk marking the burial site of members of the Ying family.

== See also ==
- Chinese people in New York City
