= Deer Park Buddhist Center and Monastery =

Buddhist monastery in Oregon, Wisconsin

Coordinates: 42.962970°N 89.352329°W

The Deer Park Buddhist Center and Monastery in Oregon, Wisconsin is headed by Geshe Lhundub Sopa, the first Tibetan tenured professor in an American University who taught Buddhist philosophy, language and culture at the University of Wisconsin–Madison for 30 years. During that time, Geshe Sopa trained many of the United States first generation of respected Buddhist scholars and translators, including Jeffrey Hopkins and John Makransky.

The Deer Park Corp. is in the process of building a new $2.7M temple project to house an extensive collection of Tibetan art and artifacts, provide greater capacity for group meetings and educational sessions, continue the expansion of Tibetan Buddhism in the United States by training a successive string of new monks, and to continue the promotion of the cause of Tibetan freedom from China. Part of the project also includes restoration work that will be done on the current temple, which was originally an open-air pavilion erected to house the first Kalachakra Initiation performed by the Dalai Lama in the western world. That event, performed in 1981, is commemorated by the stupa that was erected the following year near the current temple.

Geshe Sopa founded Deer Park Buddhist Center in 1975, after students began requesting instruction outside the formal academic setting. Deer Park today remains the only full-scale monastic and teaching center upholding the Dalai Lama's tradition in the Midwest, attracting students from around the world to its annual programs.

Geshe Sopa has facilitated an ongoing relationship between the Dalai Lama and the University of Wisconsin–Madison, which he has visited five times, and from which he has received an honorary doctoral degree.

== See also ==
- Buddhism in the United States
- Buddhist monasticism
