= Texas Buddhist Association =

Buddhist organization based in the United States

Coordinates: 29.701560°N 95.606830°W

American Bodhi Center

Religion
- Affiliation: Buddhism

Location
- Location: 37979 FM2979, Hempstead TX 77445
- Country: United States
- Interactive map of American Bodhi Center

Architecture
- Founder: Venerable Hung I
- Completed: Official Grand Opening May 2, 2009

Jade Buddha Temple

Religion
- Affiliation: Buddhism

Location
- Location: 6969 West Branch Dr., Houston TX 77072
- Country: United States
- Interactive map of Jade Buddha Temple

Architecture
- Founder: Venerable Wing Sing and Venerable Jan Hai
- Completed: 1979

Website
- http://www.jadebuddha.org

The Texas Buddhist Association (TBA, traditional Chinese: 德州佛教會; simplified Chinese: 德州佛教会; pinyin: Dézhōu Fójiào Huì) is a non-profit nondenominational religious organization committed to providing religious ceremonies and educational programs and serving the community. Not distinguishing between different sects of Buddhism, TBA places an emphasis on spreading the right views of the Dharma. The mission statement is to adopt and practice Buddha's teachings of loving kindness, compassion, joyfulness, and serenity in our daily lives for the benefit of ourselves and others; and to cultivate the wisdom necessary for clear understanding of both the universe and the human spirit. With multiple monastics and a large lay congregation, TBA is now one of the largest Buddhist associations in the United States, with its 515-acre American Bodhi Center in Waller County, Texas one of the largest by area Buddhist facilities in the country, comparable with the nearby 500 acre Chung Tai International Retreat Center Texas Pagoda Chan Monastery in Shepherd, Texas, the 400 acre Deer Park Monastery in Escondido, California, and the 700 acres of the City of Ten Thousand Buddhas in Ukiah, California.

== History ==
TBA was founded in 1979 by a group of lay Buddhists under the guidance of Venerable Wing Sing, Venerable Jan Hai, and Venerable Hung I. The first center, Buddha's Light Temple (佛光寺), was completed in 1984 in the Almeda area of southeastern Houston. However, the Taiwanese, Vietnamese, Chinese, and other Asian communities were largely closer to the Bellaire area of south-west Houston, and in 1989, the Jade Buddha Temple was constructed in that area to be closer to the core constituency. Over the years, TBA continued expansion to become one of the largest Buddhist institutions in the southern United States, with over 1500 participating families as of 2005. In addition to Chinese-based services, Buddhist courses and meditation classes in English were added to appeal to the more diverse membership. Various community service outreach activities were also emphasized. Invited notable monastics and prominent Buddhist leaders from countries such as India and Singapore as well as from across the United States, such as Venerable Thubten Chodron, also visit to give guest lectures. In 2000, TBA officially began planning for the American Bodhi Center, the first phase of which was completed in 2008. TBA has adapted American practices – such as having a lay board oversee administrative and financial duties, and having pew-style seating in one of the main halls - with the traditional Eastern customs of historic Buddhist temples.

== Jade Buddha Temple ==
玉佛寺

- 6969 Westbranch Dr, Houston, TX 77072

Construction on the two and a half acre Jade Buddha Temple was completed in 1990, and the Jade Buddha Temple has served as headquarters for the TBA since then. On June 2, 1990, the inaugural ceremony of the Jade Buddha Temple, Texas State Representative Robert Eckels proclaimed June 2 as “Texas Buddhism Day” on behalf of Governor Bill Clements. Currently, the complex consists of the Grand Buddha Hall (which can seat 500), Kwan-Yin Meditation Hall, the Youth Activity Center, a library with a large Chinese and English collection of Buddhist literature from varying traditions, a cafeteria, several living quarters, and a lotus pond with a statue of Kwan-Yin as its centerpiece. In addition to serving the religious and spiritual needs of its members, the Temple functions as a Buddhist study and research center for several educational institutions, including the University of Houston, Rice University, the University of Texas, and St John's School.

As of 2013, the temple is open daily to the public from 10am-5pm, and frequently hosts special events for Buddhist holidays. A typical Sunday schedule has dharma-talks in Mandarin in the Grand Buddha Hall from 10am-12pm, with English-language meditation sessions and dharma-talk in the Kwan Yin Hall from 9-11am. Smaller classes and weekly discussion groups meet at different times during the week. There are daily morning and evening chanting services, but advance registration may be needed as those can occur outside of public hours. As of 2011, many of the Mandarin and a few of the English lectures can be watched online.

== American Bodhi Center ==
The American Bodhi Center (Chinese: 美洲菩提中心; pinyin: Měizhōu Pútí Zhōngxīn), a 515-acre (208 ha) property located in unincorporated Waller County, near Hempstead, is a part of the TBA. It includes log houses, dormitories, and a meditation hall. In 2009 Zen T. C. Zheng of the Houston Chronicle stated that it is one of the United States's largest Buddhist developments.

After 20 years of spreading the dharma in the South, TBA began planning for a long-term center integrated with the local community and serving the public's needs. In 2001, TBA purchased 515 acres of land in Waller County, a 49-mile / 55-minute drive from the Jade Buddha Temple in Houston. The official grand opening of the American Bodhi Center was held on May 2, 2009, the 2553th birthday of Shakyamuni Buddha. The center was built with local contractors and with environmentally friendly design in consideration. Rare original relics of Shakyamuni Buddha may be seen at ABC. Other organizations are welcome to use the site for appropriate activities as well. Currently, the American Bodhi Center consists of:

- Meditation Hall, the main building of ABC, which houses a Gandharan style Shakyamuni Buddha statue and a wooden Bodhisattva statue dated back to the Ching dynasty
- Dining facility and Dormitories
- Samadhi Houses, for members who would like to live at ABC for longer periods of time or for retreats
- Organic Garden and Bamboo Grove
- Sun Moon Lake
- Wanshou Memorial Park, with a Gratitude Tower / Memorial Hall. Inside are four halls: Hai Huei Hall, Fu Shou Hall, Zhi Du Hall, and An Yang Hall, each with an Amida Buddha statue. Ashes of the deceased can be respected in the columbarium of each hall.

== Bodhi Chinese Language School ==
菩提學苑 The Bodhi Chinese school offers weekend classes for children and teenagers to learn Chinese language, as well as cultural activities such as calligraphy, yoga, SAT preparation, and music. It is housed in the two story Youth Activity Center behind Jade Buddha Temple. Courses are grounded in the Buddhist principles of compassion and morality. Youth summer camps incorporate a different topic each summer, for example, "Cherish the Environment". Bodhi scholarships (around 12 students per year) are also offered for those promising college-bound students who need financial aid.

== Dharma Garden (Publication) ==
佛光法苑 Dharma Garden is a primarily Chinese-language journal containing both introductory and practical, as well as more academic articles, on various facets of Buddhism. It has been published bimonthly since 1979, and issues since 2008 are available to read for free online as well.
