= Wat Boston Buddha Vararam =

Buddhist temple in Bedford, Massachusetts

Coordinates: 42°30′3.6″N 71°16′55.7″W

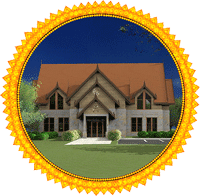

Wat Boston Buddha Vararam (Abbreviated BBVT) is a Thai Theravada Buddhist Temple or Wat located in Bedford, Massachusetts. It is one of two Thai Buddhist Temples in Massachusetts, the other being Wat Nawamintararachutis. The main community at Wat Boston includes primarily Cambodians, Thais and Laos communities, although they welcome all.

Wat Boston Buddha Vararam was started as a small house in Malden, Massachusetts by Phra Ajan Kitti, and moved to Bedford, Massachusetts in 1998 in search of more space.
