= Wat Buddhasamakeevanaram =

Buddhist temple in Bossier City, Louisiana

Coordinates: 32°24′25″N 93°35′23″W

Wat Buddhasamakeevanaram is a Thai Theravada Buddhist temple is located at 983 Caplis-Sligo Road, Bossier City, Louisiana (LA 71112). The temple belongs to the Dhammayuttika Nikaya order and follows Theravada tradition. It is the first Thai temple established in the state of Louisiana.

== History ==
The temple was formed in 2003 to serve the religious needs of the Thai, Laotian and Vietnamese communities in the Shreveport-Bossier Area. It was incorporated in the state as a nonprofit religious corporation on November the following year. Every April, the temple celebrates on Songkran, one of the biggest holidays in the year.

There is a tradition to offer gifts of food and clothing to the monks by the local Buddhists who visit the temple to remember and pray for their dead members of their family and relatives. In return, the Monks burn the messages written by Buddhist members to pray their loved ones.
