= Wat Buddhanusorn =

Thai Buddhist temple in California

Coordinates: 37.581475°N 121.995591°W

Wat Buddhanusorn is a Buddhist temple of the Theravadan tradition in Fremont, California, United States. The name, Wat Buddhanusorn, means “temple for the dedication of the Buddha,” in the Thai language. It was founded in 1983 and, in Buddhist tradition, relies on donations and volunteer work for support. The temple community serves to propagate the Buddha’s teachings and practice, to teach and promote Thai art, language, and culture to all those who are interested, and to serve as a pillar for the Thai community in the San Francisco Bay Area.

== Daily life ==
In the morning, monks gather in the main hall to chant and meditate. After the morning meal, they begin their work in and around the temple and meditate on sweeping the grounds. In the afternoon, after the main lunch meal, the monks continue with the temple projects. In the evening the monks again gather in the main hall for chanting and meditation.

On Sundays, many temple goers bring food to be donated to the monks; It the time where the Thai community get together. Extra food is given away for donation where the money goes to the maintenance of the temple and to the temple renovation project. This includes better housing for the monks and Thai cultural study rooms for the students and kids. On special occasions, there are Thai classical dance and musical performances, usually for Thai religious holidays or Thai royalty's birthdays.

== Historic highlights ==
Wat Buddhanusorn has enjoyed visits from many dignitaries, including Queen Sirikit of Thailand in 1993, during the temple’s tenth anniversary. She dedicated a stone and planted a tree to commemorate the event, making it the only temple outside Thailand where the Queen has given such a blessing. Somdech Phramaha Thiracarya, abbot of Wat Chana Songkhram, visited and blessed the temple in 1993. In 1996 Princess Soamsawali dedicated the temple’s spire, in addition to planting trees on previous visits. Princess Bajakitiyabha has also visited and planted trees. In 1997 Somdech Phramaha Rajmangalacarya, presided over the largest gathering of Thai monks in the San Francisco Bay Area, over 150 monks, for the demarcation of the temple.

== Programs ==
The temple has a performing arts school for children.
