= Vajiradhammapadip Temple =

Coordinates: 40.85283°N 73.09373°W

Vajiradhammapadip Temple is a Theravada Buddhist temple in New York, United States. There are two locations: one being in Mount Vernon, and the more recent being in Centereach, New York.

== Location ==
Vajiradhammapadip Temple filed as a not-for-profit organization under the "Religious Corporation Law of State of New York" on July 22, 1975(B.E. 2518). The original location was on 179th Street in the West Bronx. However, due to the small physical size of the temple and the large numbers of members, the temple was moved to its current location in 75 California Road, Mount Vernon on July 17, 1983(B.E. 2526). In 1991(B.E. 2534) the property at 110 Rustic Road, Centereach, New York (Long Island) was purchased, and it has been used as the main temple up to the present time. The building at Mount Vernon is maintained to be the office, the residence for monks, and a center for small religious services. The new Temple in Long Island was completed in new building in June 2010, located at 110 Rustic Road, Centereach.

== Programs ==
In addition to religious services, courses in the Thai and Pāli languages, Thai culture and Thai music are offered to the community.
