= Wat Buddhananachat of Austin =

Wat Buddhananachat

Religion
- Affiliation: Theravada

Location
- Location: 8105 Linden Rd., Del Valle, TX 78617
- Country: United States
- Interactive map of Wat Buddhananachat
- Coordinates: 30.13783°N 97.58372°W

Architecture
- Founder: Ven. Phramaha Thewa Pribueng
- Completed: April 1986

Wat Buddhananachat is a Buddhist Temple located about 20 miles southeast of Downtown, on Linden Rd. in Del Valle, Texas.

This Buddhist temple was established in April, 1986 (incorporated on August 4, 1986) as a nonprofit organization to serve as a center for religious and cultural activities for Theravadic Buddhist belonging to different ethnic communities in central Texas.

== Quick stats ==
Leader/Title: Most Ven. Phramaha Bancha Temprom

Ethnic Composition: Mostly Thai, Laos, Cambodian with a growing non-Thai/Laos/Cambodian population

Resident Monks: Ven. Phramaha Bancha Temprom (Abbot), Ven. Phramaha Phaisit Dhammaraso (Sattayavut), Ven. Phra Raem Poonnongwaeng (reverend), Ven. Phramaha Vachira Maneeram, Ven. Phra Somboon Phichaikul, Maha Sarawut Warawoot (Thomas) and Ven. Phra Somchay Mali.

Tradition: Theravada

== History ==
Wat Buddhanannachat in Del Valle is uncontested for the title of the first Asian temple in the area. It was built on a farmhouse a few miles east of what is now the Austin Bergstrom International Airport. Until 1999, Bergstrom International Airport was Bergstrom Airforce Base. Many of the founding lay members of the temple are Thai women who married American servicemen stationed at the base. A sizable community of Thais, as well as Cambodians and Laotians, desired a center for traditional Buddhist practice as well as ceremonies such as weddings and funeral rites. So, in 1986, a farm site was purchased and arrangements were made with the Council of Thai Bhikkhus to have monks sent to Del Valle to found the Wat Buddhanannachat of Austin Temple. Since that time, the temple has grown from less than 20 families to nearly 500 families that support 8 monks. Several photo albums kept in the prayer hall record the entire history of the temple's construction and growth.

== Activities and schedule ==
The temple holds regular services in Thai at 12:00 p.m. on Sundays, but offers English translations. Lay people usually come every morning around 10:00 a.m. to offer food to the monks, which they call 'tom boon'. It is a way of gaining merit and considered good luck to do this in Thai Buddhist culture. Monks at the temple will usually pray at 8 a.m. every morning and every evening at 8 p.m. The monks pray by chanting in Pali.

Miss Loy Krathong 2009 at Wat Buddhanachat .

Many festivals are held throughout the year at the temple and attract many local and non-local Buddhists as well as non-Buddhists. Some of these festivals include the very popular Loy Krathong Lotus Flower Festival and Songkran, which are also a big part of celebration in Thailand. Wat Buddhananachat also has a large pond adjacent to the temple, allowing people to place there paper-crafted lotus's in the water during 'Loy Krathong'. There is also a Miss Loy Krathong pageant held every year where one young girl is crowned the winner based on the number of tickets given to her by attendees of the festival.

Every year towards the end of May Visakha Puja is celebrated to honor when the Buddha was born, attained enlightenment and achieved parinirvana, which all according to tradition occurred on the same days. Lay people come to the temple in the morning offering food and monetary donations to the monks and temple. Lay people place rice in the alms bowls of monks as they walk by. This in Thai/Lao tradition is a way of 'tom boon' (gaining good merit or good karma). Towards the end of the celebration, the monks, temporarily ordained nuns and lay people around the temple 3 times in order to commemorate the 3 significant events in the Buddha's life: Birth, Enlightenment and Parinirvana.

== Demographics ==
The majority of the temple community consists of Thais, Cambodians, and Laotians. The most commonly used language is Thai while prayer and chanting is conducted in Pali. Transliterated texts are available to English-speakers. When it was first founded the congregation consisted of mainly Thai and Lao immigrants and their children.

== Description ==
There are two buildings located on the temple complex. The first building contains living quarters for the 8 monks as well as a kitchen and the main prayer hall. The prayer hall is equipped with icons of Buddhas and Arahants. A row of pictures along the wall depicts the life of the Buddha as well as the Buddha's previous incarnations. There are also portraits of the royal family of Thailand and an American flag. A large sofa is located at the back of the prayer hall for those who cannot sit on the floor. The second building contains a large hall used for festivals, weddings, and other celebrations. During the day, this space is used by the lay community to sell fresh produce and delicacies such as Thai soup, noodles, and fried bananas. At night, the space is often rented out for private parties. All of the proceeds from these activities serve to support the monastery. The temple grounds also support gardens for produce, herbs, and flowers. Many of the monks enjoy tending the gardens as a pastime.
