= Wat Mongkolratanaram (Tampa, Florida) =

Buddhist Thai temple

Coordinates: 27.9432°N 82.3953°W

- วัดมงคลรัตนาราม แทมป้า ฟลอริด้า (Thai)

Religion
- Affiliation: Theravada (Mahanikaya Nikaya)

Location
- Location: 5306 Palm River Road, Tampa, Florida 34746
- Country: United States
- Interactive map of Wat Mongkolratanaram

Architecture
- Style: Thai Buddhist Wat
- Founder: Lung-po Chaokhun Phra Mongkolratanavides
- Completed: 2007
- Interior area: 2,512 square feet

Website
- https://wattampainenglish.com/

Wat Mongkolratanaram is a Buddhist Thai temple on the bank of the Palm River in Tampa, Florida. It was founded in 1981 as well as dedicated and registered as a temple on 19 May 1981. Besides a temple, it acts as an education and support centre.

The temple's grounds host a Sunday food market with Thai cuisine.

== History ==
In 1981, Phramongkolthep Moli, an assistant abbot, came to meet with Buddhists from various cities in Florida, and agreed to build the first temple in Tampa, Florida, which has a high Thai Buddhist population. A temple was recorded as Wat Mongkolratanaram of Florida Inc., Thai Buddhist Temple, Interbay Area Florida. It was founded on 19 May 1981 under the Thai Sangha Assembly. Until the property at 5306 Palm River Road was purchased in 1982, religious services were held in a house rented off of Dale Mabry Highway. The new property had a living room-sized white concrete building that served as the temple. In 1986, they bought four more acres to expand the temple complex. The first Sunday Market was held in 1987 and has become a weekly tradition. They began saving for a traditional Thai Buddhist temple in 1990 and held the groundbreaking for a dormitory and temple in 2004. In 2005, they had raised one third of the one million dollars needed to finish the temple. The temple was completed and dedicated in May 2007. In November, emissary to King Bhumibol Adulyadej, Judge Kongsak Watcharakongsak, came to Tampa to present the temple with the royal Thot Kathin (sacred robe), the highest religious honor in Thailand. The Wat Mongkolratanram was the first Buddhist temple in the United States to receive such an honor. Since 2007, there have been three updates to the temple grounds: a new deck in 2008, a seawall and benches were added in 2011, and refurbished the Sunday Market deck and replaced the aging boat dock in 2015.

== Architecture ==
The current temple building and dormitories were constructed in 2006 and 2007. The temple is a traditional Thai Buddhist Viharn where several Buddhist ceremonies take place and the area where both monks and lay people will come to pray. The temple has various gold elements due to the Buddhist belief that gold is the symbol for happiness, purity, enlightenment and freedom. Gold elements include a tile roof, golden chofas, decorative gold pediments on all three eaves, a tympanum, a golden archway on the entrance, and gold capitals on each of the columns surrounding the building. Within the temple complex there is a colorful naga, which is believed to protect the temple.
