= Wat Carolina Buddhajakra Vanaram =

Thai Buddhist monastery near Bolivia, North Carolina

Coordinates: 34.0083°N 78.1464°W

Wat Carolina Buddhajakra Vanaram is a Thai Buddhist Monastery. It is located near Bolivia, North Carolina (or about 20 miles (32 km) west of Wilmington, North Carolina). The Wat Carolina Monastery is under the leadership of Abbot Phrakru Buddamonpricha.

== History ==
Abbot Phrakru Buddhamonpricha came to Oak Island in 1986 to visit his two sisters and brother, which was then called Long Beach, N.C. In 1987, the four of them founded the Buddhist Association of North Carolina. After his siblings donated 21 acres (85,000 m^{2}) of land, Phrakru returned to America from Indonesia to establish the Wat Carolina Monastery, which opened later that year.
