= Wat Florida Dhammaram =

Buddhist monastery in Kissimmee, Florida

- วัดฟลอริดาธรรมมาราม
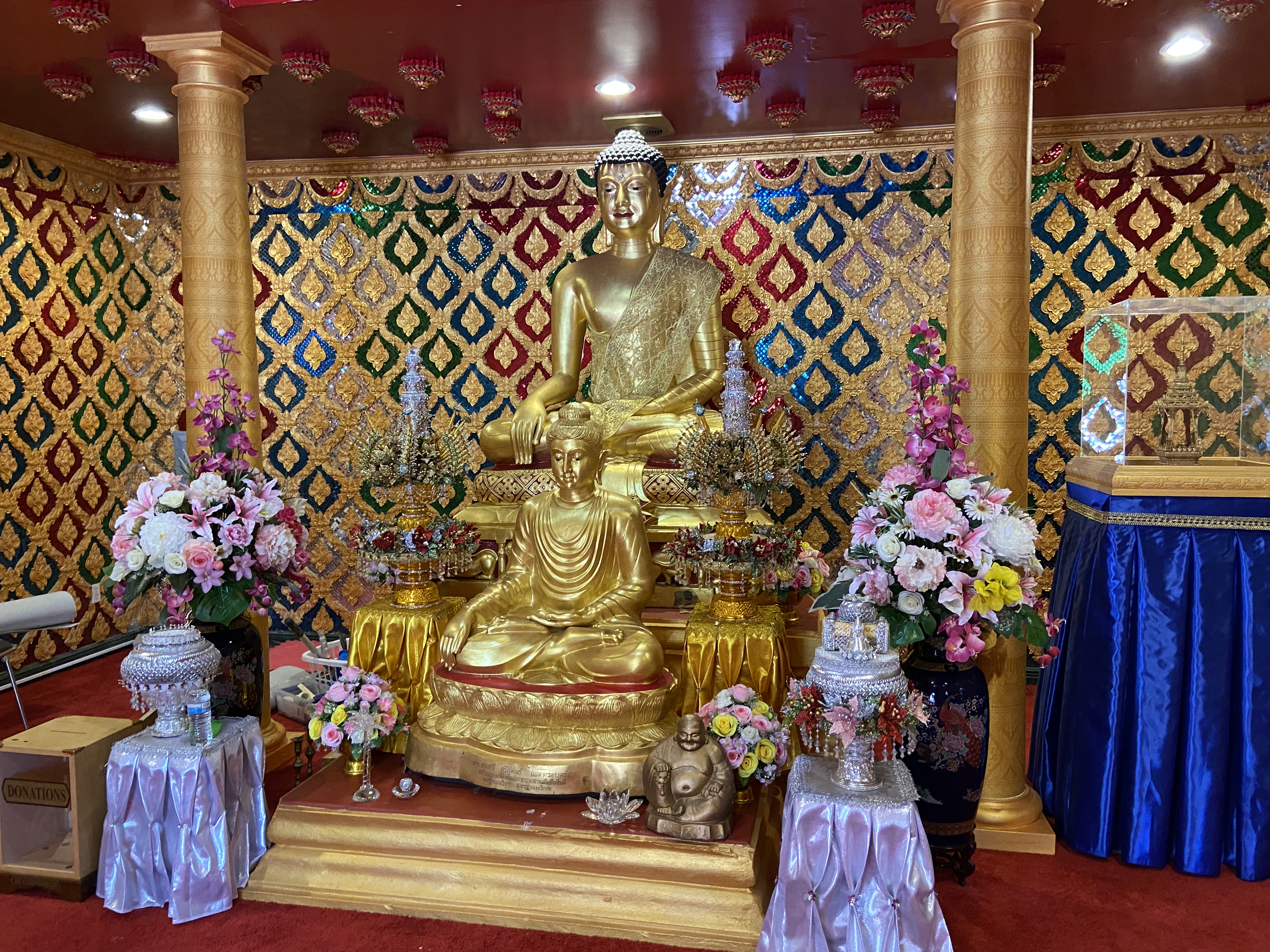
- Interior of their Maha Bodhi Temple

Religion
- Affiliation: Theravada (Dhammayuttika Nikaya) ธรรมยุติกนิกาย

Location
- Location: 2421 Old Vineland Road, Kissimmee, Florida 34746
- Country: United States
- Interactive map of Wat Florida Dhammaram
- Coordinates: 28°19′1″N 81°27′48″W

Architecture
- Founder: Lung-po Chaokhun Phra Tepvaraporn
- Completed: 1993

Website
- http://www.watflorida.com

Wat Florida Dhammaram (Thai: วัดฟลอริดาธรรมมาราม) is a Buddhist monastery in Kissimmee, Florida, established by Lung-po Chaokhun Phra Tepvaraporn (Im Arindhamo) in the mid-1990s.

== History ==
Lung-po visited lay-devotees in Florida and perceived the lack of a Buddhist monastery in the Central Florida area. After gaining approval from the late abbot of Wat Sommanat Vihara, Chaokhun Somdej Phra Wannarat Chop Thitadhammamahathera, he began fund raising in Thailand. In 1993, three monks were sent with Prakrupalad Sunnan (now Chaokhun Phra Vijitrdhammapani, the present abbot) to establish and further the development of Wat Florida Dhammaram.
