= Thupten Phelgye =

Buddhist monk (born 1956)

Geshe Thupten Phelgye
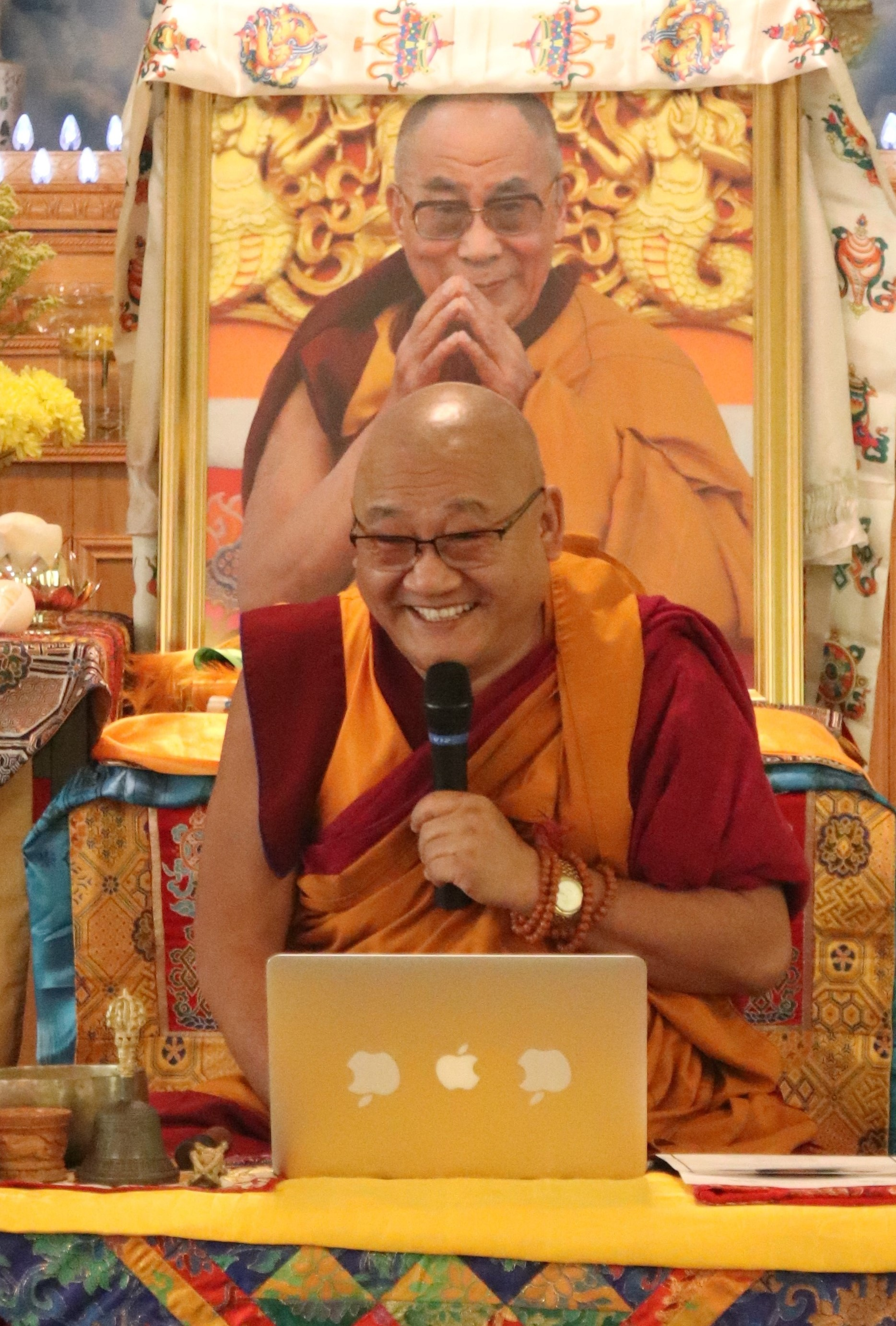
- Geshe Thupten Phelgye teaching at the Buddhist Institute of Universal Compassion.
- Born: Dorje Tinlay; 1956 (age 69–70); Riwoche District the traditional Tibetan province of Kham
- Education: Seraje College, Sera Monastic University
- Occupation: Tibetan Buddhist lama
- Years active: 1973-present

Geshe Thupten Phelgye (born 1956) is a Tibetan Buddhist lama who is known for promoting vegetarianism and humane treatment of animals, and for his work as a peace activist. Geshe Thupten Phelgye represents the Gelug tradition in the Tibetan Parliament in Exile.

== Biography ==
Geshe Thupten Phelgye, born 1956, was from Riwoche District the traditional Tibetan province of Kham and was named Dorje Tinlay. In 1959, three-year-old Dorje and his family fled. He attended school in India at C.S.T. Changlang and S.F.F. School Dehradun.

He became a monk in 1973, at age 17, at Seraje College, Sera Monastic University.

After completing the traditional 18-year course of study for the geshe degree in 1991, he received his doctorate in Buddhist Philosophy from Sera Monastic University in 1991, and went on to study at Gyumed Monastery. Starting in 1993, he spent five years in retreat near Dharamshala in the Dhauladhar mountains.

Over the years, he has been giving talks and teachings around the world, advocating vegetarianism and Universal Compassion for world peace. His message is simple: all beings deserve equal compassion like ourselves. The Universal Compassion Movement is his agenda.

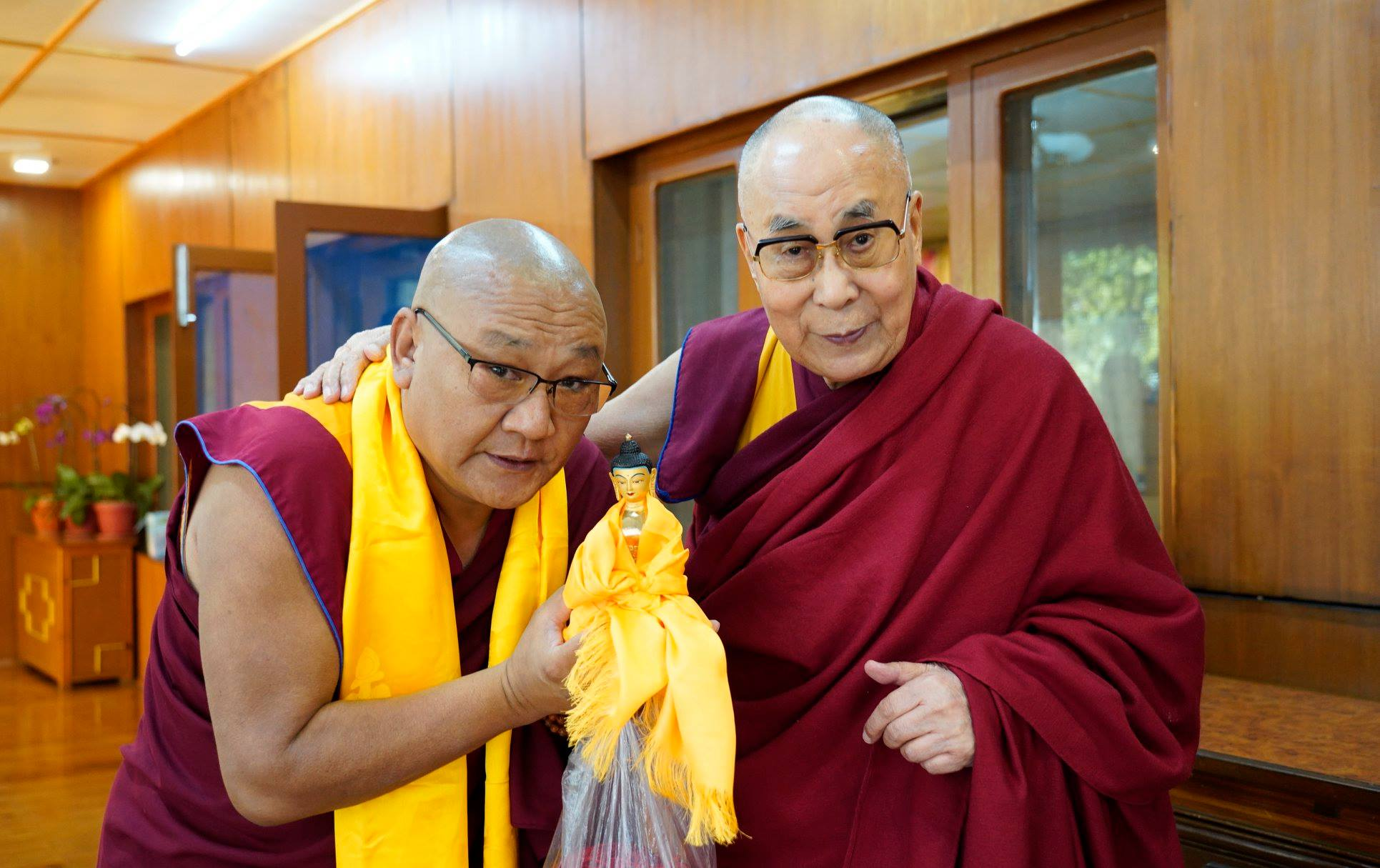
His Holiness the 14th Dalai Lama and Venerable Geshe Thupten Phelgye

He took a leave from his political service in the Tibetan Parliament in 2011; he was brought to the United States in 2012 to serve as a Global Scholar in Residence at Gonzaga University and later at Eastern Washington University. In 2017 he founded The Buddhist Institute of Universal Compassion in Spokane, Washington, USA.

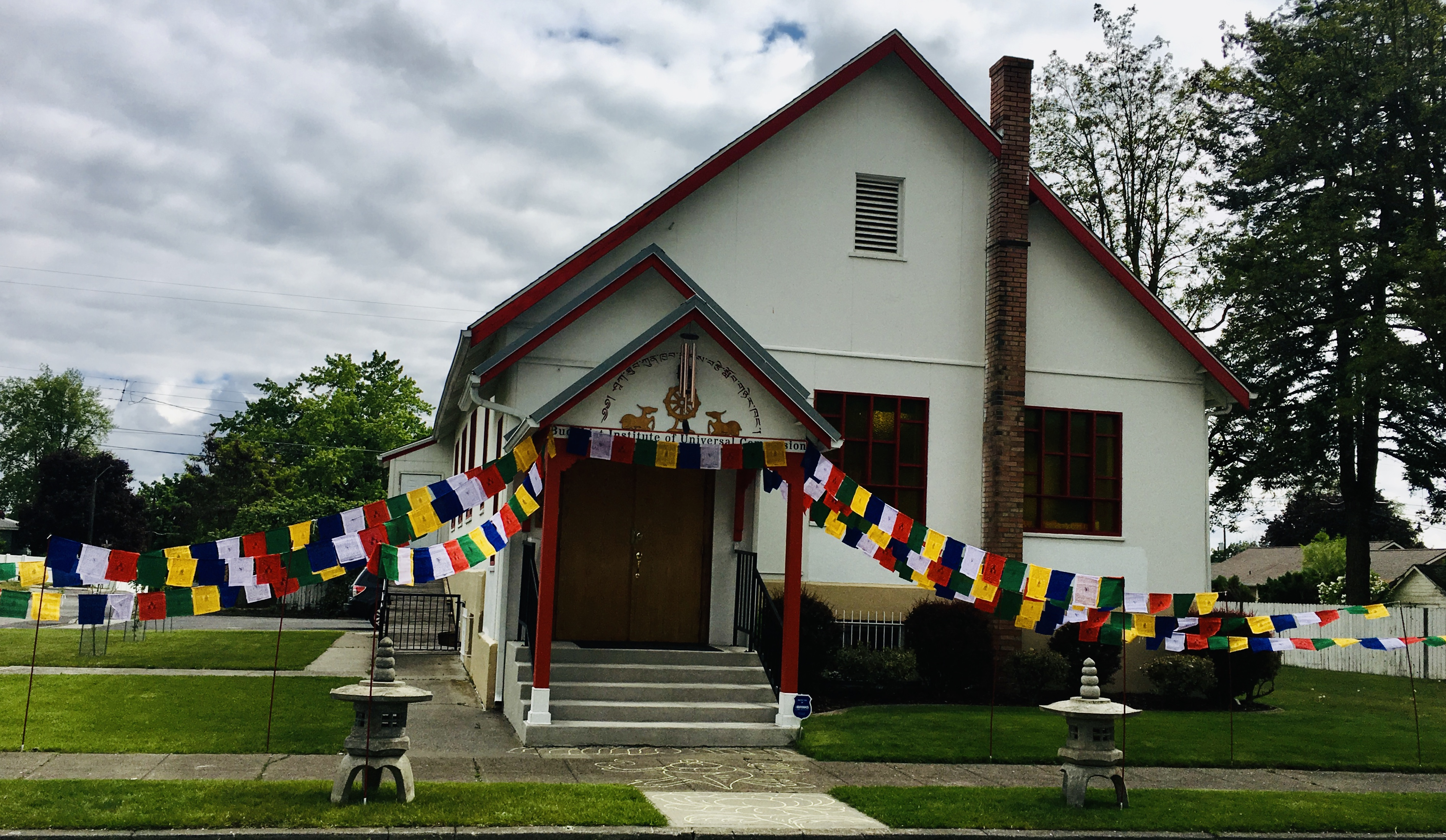

== Vegetarian advocacy ==
Thupten Phelgye saw the inside of a slaughterhouse as a young monastic who showed up early to the market one morning while helping a sick elder. As a result, from that day forward he became a fearless warrior advocating for not only vegetarianism but Universal Compassion for all beings. Soon thereafter, he founded his Universal Compassion Movement (Foundation) UCF.

As the first President of the International Gelug Society, he helped pass the resolution for vegetarianism for all residents of Gelug monasteries and nunneries. He helped pass a 2003 bill in the Tibetan Parliament in Exile, where he is a representative of the Gelug tradition, which encouraged Tibetans to become vegetarian, by declaring 2004 the "Tibetan Vegetarian Year." He was re-elected to the Parliament in 2006.

He founded a charitable trust, the Universal Compassion Movement Now, officially known as Universal Compassion Foundation (UCF) a 501 (c)3 non-profit charity registered under 170(b)(1)(A)(vi) in the United States of America.(UCM), with the mission of bringing people together to help animals who are slaughtered or suffer cruel and inhumane treatment by promoting Universal Compassion in our lives and for all beings.

His US speaking engagements have included Amherst College, Gonzaga University, Harvard University, Naropa University, North Idaho College, University of Idaho, University of California at Santa Barbara, University of San Francisco, and Wheaton College. He has given teachings at Sravasti Abbey and other US Buddhist centers.

== Charitable activities and peace work ==
Thupten Phelgye is active in interfaith dialogue. With respect to the differences between Buddhism and Christianity, a student newspaper described his position as follows: "The main issue ... [is] to focus on the day-to-day practice of 'how to be nice and how to be good,'" and also noted his emphasis on practical, "every-day [sic] practice" to serve others.

In 2004, the Dalai Lama requested Thupten Phelgye to serve as "an emissary for peace." He is active in Middle East peace efforts, via the Sulha Peace Project.

In May, 2012, Thupten Phelgye began his annual Animal Blessing. He blessed around 100 pets that day, mostly dogs, at Marymoor Park to promote compassion and peace. He has since blessed countless animals and pets alike at various parks, sanctuary’s, and temples.

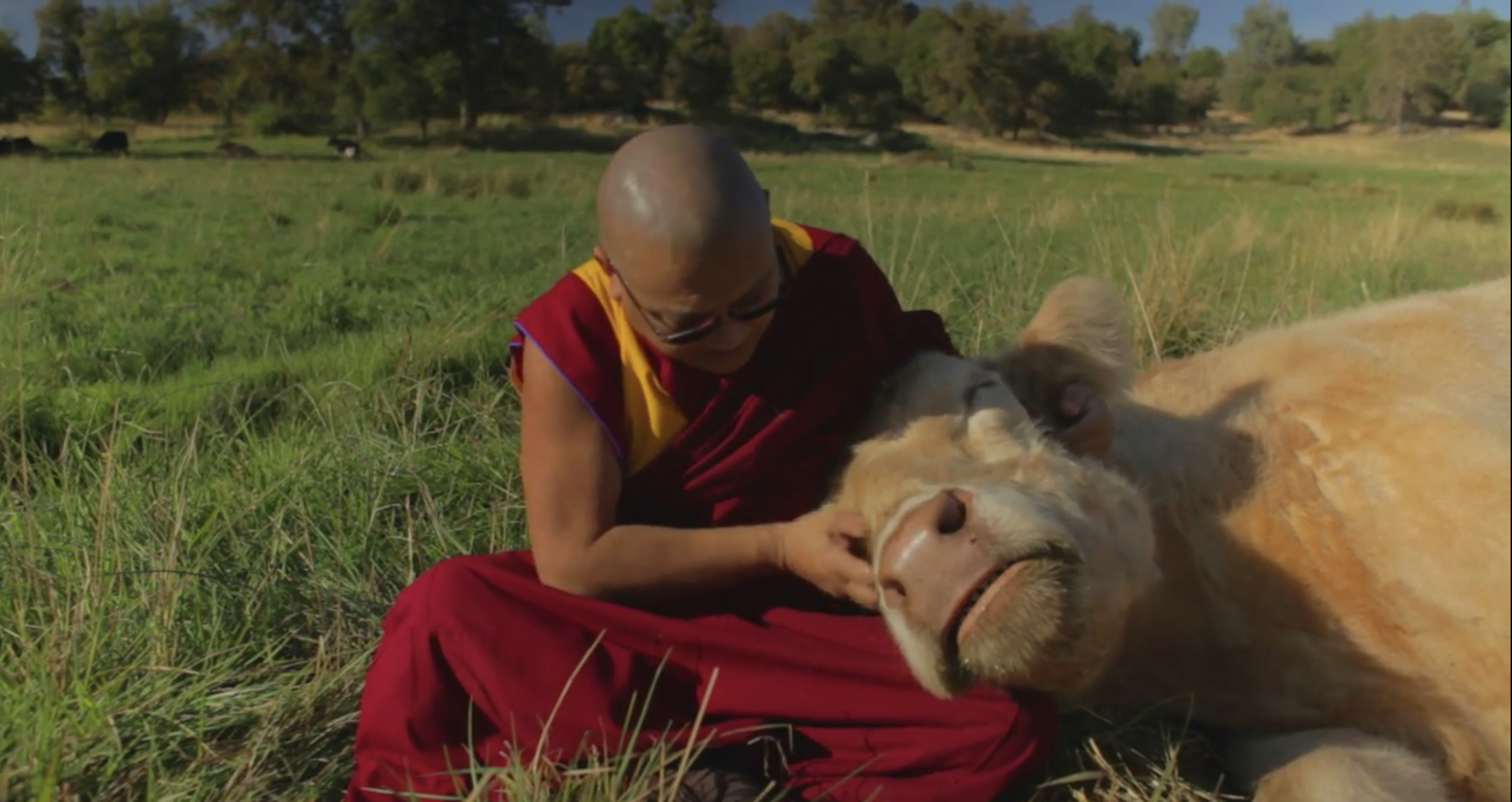
Venerable Geshe Phelgye lays down with a rescue cow from River's Wish Animal Sanctuary

Every year, he blesses food offerings for River's Wish Animal Sanctuary annual Thanksgiving of Compassion with a Harvest for the Animals. He then blesses each animal with special prayers for their long life and future spiritual journeys.

== Film ==
In 2002, the Geshe acted as a senior monk in an Indian Hindi film, directed by Shaji N. Karun, Nishad (English title: Octave).

== Writings ==
- Community of Faith: A Buddhist perspective on mindful eating, guest editorial
