= Postulant =

Person who formally requests to be admitted to the novitiate of a religious order

A postulant (from Latin: postulare, 'to ask') was originally one who makes a request or demand; hence, a candidate. The use of the term is now generally restricted to those asking for admission into a Christian monastery or a religious order for the period preceding their admission into the novitiate.

The term is most commonly used in the Catholic Church, Evangelical-Lutheran Churches, and the Anglican Communion (which includes the Episcopal Church) to designate those who are seeking ordination to the diaconate or priesthood. In this respect, postulancy is generally considered the first formal step leading to candidacy (for ordination) and ordination. The Eastern Orthodox Church uses this term less frequently.

== Purpose, duration and formation ==
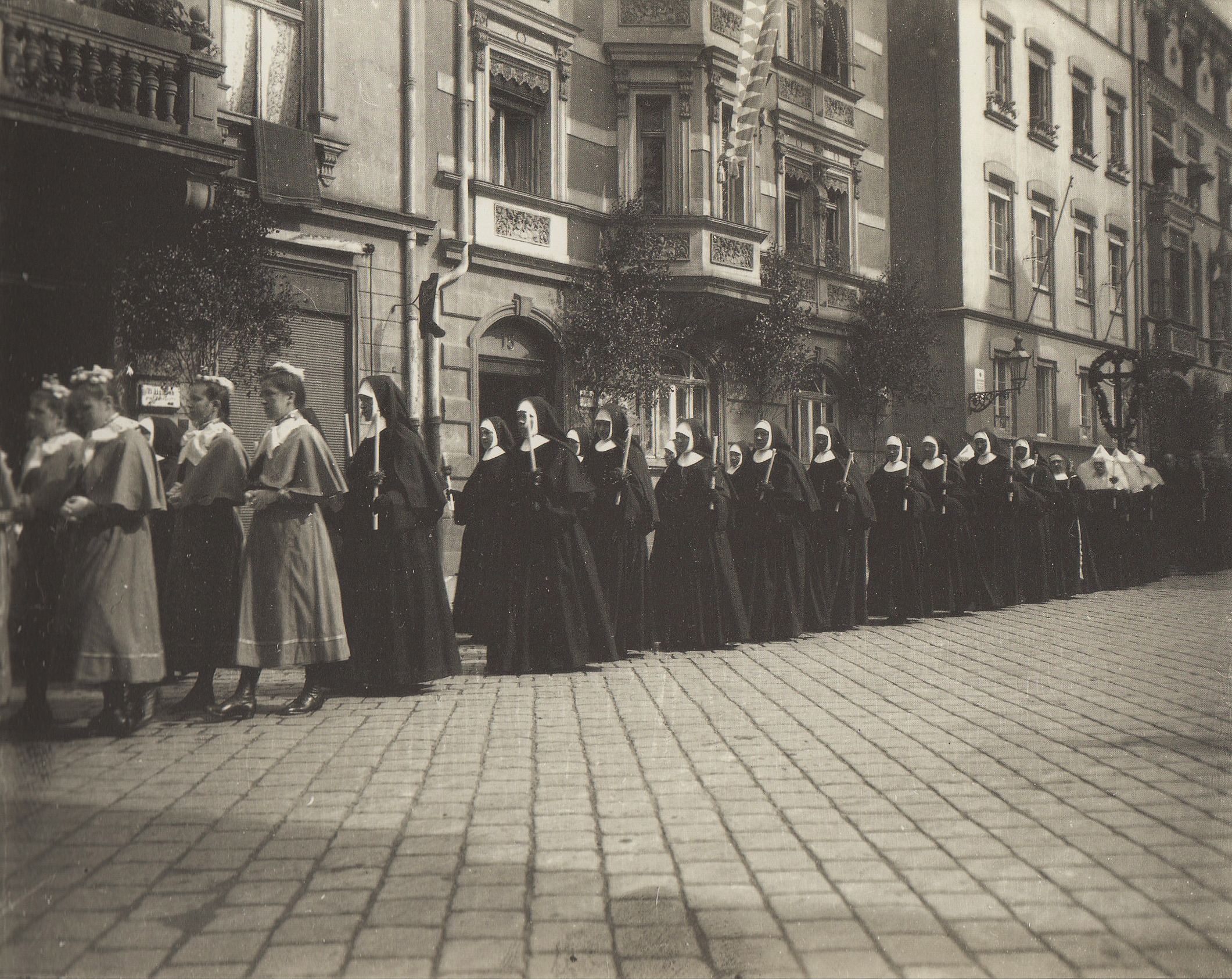
Nuns at a procession in 1915. The postulants in their garbs are walking in front of the professed nuns.

The length of time that a prospective candidate remains a postulant may vary depending on the institution or the postulant's situation. Among active religious institutions, it typically lasted 4–6 months. At present, many monasteries have a candidate spend 1–2 years in this stage. In the Catholic church, the implementing instruction Cor orans determines that a postulancy in a contemplative community has a minimum duration of twelve months, but it must not exceed two years. In Evangelical-Lutheran monastic communities, such as the Sisters of St. Francis at Klaradals Convent, the time spent as a postulant is typically one year. During this time, the postulant generally participates as fully as possible in the life of the community, joining the novices and professed members and living with the community. Usually, the postulant joins the formal education that is given to the novices. Some communities prefer the postulants to wear a specific garb (as this was rather common until the release of Perfectae Caritatis, the decree on the adaptation and renewal of religious life, in 1965), in other communities, they wear their plain clothes until the formal investiture ceremony.

Since postulants, as novices, are not members of the institution at this stage, it is easier for a person not fully certain about religious life to re-examine their intentions and commitment before making any vows. Likewise, should the person be determined to be unsuited to the life, they can be dismissed by an institution without the need for a formal procedure.

The term is also sometimes used to describe the ecclesiastical status of a person who has discerned a call to the priesthood or the diaconate and has received parish and diocesan endorsement. The candidate retains postulant status throughout seminary, until ordination to the transitional diaconate takes place. The postulant who will not pursue ordination into the priesthood is ordained into the vocational diaconate.

== College fraternities ==
In college fraternities, the term postulant is also used to describe those who have yet to be initiated into the fraternity, while they are going through the process of becoming a brother or a sister.
