= Sravasti Abbey =

Tibetan Buddhist monastery near Newport, Washington

Coordinates: 48°04′37″N 117°08′23″W

Religion
- Affiliation: Tibetan Buddhism

Location
- Location: Newport, Washington, United States
- Interactive map of Sravasti Abbey

Architecture
- Founder: Thubten Chodron
- Established: 2003

Sravasti Abbey, the first Tibetan Buddhist monastery for Western nuns and monks in the U.S., was established in Washington State by Bhikshuni Thubten Chodron in 2003. Whilst practicing in the Tibetan Buddhist Tradition, Sravasti Abbey monastics ordain in the Dharmaguptaka Vinaya. It is situated on 350 acres (1.4 km^{2}) of forest and meadows, 11 miles (18 km) outside of Newport, Washington, near the Idaho state line. It is open to visitors who want to learn about community life in a Tibetan Buddhist monastic setting.

The name Sravasti Abbey was chosen by the 14th Dalai Lama. Thubten Chodron had suggested the name as Sravasti was the place in India where the Buddha spent 25 rains retreats (varsa in Sanskrit and yarne in Tibetan), and communities of both nuns and monks had resided there. This seemed auspicious to ensure the Buddha's teachings would be abundantly available to both male and female monastics at the monastery.

== History ==
The Abbey was founded in 2003. Its founder, Bhikshuni Thubten Chodron, is an American who received novice ordination in 1977 by Kyabje Yongdzin Ling Rinpoche, the Dalai Lama's senior tutor and became fully ordained in 1986. Chodron was first introduced to Buddhism after seeing an advertisement and attending an event regarding Buddhist talks and retreats while pursuing her graduate studies in Los Angeles. On her spiritual journey, she found answers to her existential questions in Buddhism and after being ordained she sought to help others on their path to enlightenment as well through her teachings in the region. Chodron started searching for land around Boise, Idaho to build a monastery but was unable to find a place that had the things which she thought was important in spiritual work and meditation, a place with good views and vistas amongst forest and nature to "look at long distances and be with nature to relax the mind". She was turned onto the chosen site of the monastery by friends who made her aware of its listing, which she would eventually purchase; The monastery was named by the Dalai Lama.

Chodron had lived and studied in India and Nepal for many years, and her teachers included the Dalai Lama, Tsenzhab Serkong Rinpoche and Thubten Zopa Rinpoche. The Abbeys mission is to train monastics to spread their teaching in society and under her guidance, Sravasti Abbey has male and female monastics train together as equals, and uses social service as a key component of community life. At the same time, the Abbey cultivates the traditional Buddhist values of non-harming, mindfulness, compassion, inter-relatedness, respect for nature and service to all sentient beings.

The Abbey has a monastic residence called Gotami House, named after Mahapajapati Gotami who was the first woman to request and receive ordination from Buddha Shakyamuni. The Abbey is notable because it is home to a growing group of fully ordained bhikshunis (Buddhist nuns) practicing Buddhism in the Tibetan tradition. This is notable because the tradition of full Buddhist ordination for women was generally believed to have not been transmitted from India to Tibet, whereas Khenpo Shantarakshita brought the full ordination tradition for nuns and monks to Tibet before the persecution by Udum Tsenpo brought a temporary end to the nun's tradition. Ordained women practicing in the Tibetan tradition usually hold a getsulma (novice) ordination, while full ordination in the Tibetan tradition was revived on 23 June 2022 in Bhutan. Before this date, Thubten Chodron, while following the teachings of her Tibetan teachers, arranged for her female students to seek full ordination as bhikshunis in Taiwan.

The Abbey has regularly practiced posadha (the bi-monthly confession) since 2011.

There is also a residence for guest teachers and a guesthouse called Chenrezig Hall. Guests are welcome to visit the monastery and experience daily monastic life, which includes learning, meditation, tending to the gardens and the surrounding forests.

On October 2, 2006, Jan Howell became the first person to ordain at Sravasti Abbey, taking her sramanerika (novice) and sikasamana (probationary) ordinations with Thubten Chodron as her preceptor in 2006.

Also in 2006, the Abbey launched its first annual week-long Young Adult Retreat in order to bring Buddhist solutions to situations facing today's youth.

In January 2014, the Abbey began its first winter varsa (three-month monastic retreat), which lasted until April 13, 2014. As far as the Abbey knows, this was the first time a Western bhikshuni sangha practicing in the Tibetan tradition had done this ritual in the United States and in English. On April 19, 2014 the Abbey held its first kathina ceremony to mark the end of the varsa. Also in 2014, the Abbey held its first Pavarana rite at the end of the varsa.

In October 2015, the Annual Western Buddhist Monastic Gathering was held at the Abbey for the first time; it was the 21st such gathering.

In November 2015, the Abbey purchased their neighbor's property and named it Tara's Refuge.

In 2017, the Abbey's first bhikkhu, Thubten Losang, was ordained.

In 2018, Prajna Cottage was completed and Thubten Chodron moved into it.

Also in 2018, the Abbey community ordained Rebecca Bradley, which as far as the Abbey was aware marked the first such ordination in their Vinaya lineage (Dharmaguptaka) given by an all-Western sangha.

In 2025, the Abbey consecrated the Buddha Hall, a major expansion to the monastery which includes a library, workshops, offices, and several meditation halls.

== Daily schedule ==
The Abbey's daily schedule begins at 5:00 a.m. when both monastic and lay students perform preparatory practices and tasks such as water bowl offerings. Morning meditation practice begins at 5:30 and lasts an hour and a half. A simple breakfast is offered at 7:30. Praises to Tara is chanted first, and the meal offered to the Three Jewels. The meal is eaten in silence until a gong is rung halfway through. From 8:30 a.m. to 12:00 p.m. residents “offer service” performing tasks.

Lunch is offered at 12:00. Before eating, an information Dharma discussion is led by Thubten Chodron, other monastics or sometimes guests. These talks (and other teachings) are uploaded daily onto Sravasti Abbey's channel .

Before eating, residents recite and reflect on five contemplations to remind them of their motivation for eating:

I contemplate all the causes and conditions and the kindness of others by which I have received this food.
I contemplate my own practice, constantly trying to improve it.
I contemplate my mind, cautiously guarding it from wrongdoing, greed, and other defilements.
I contemplate this food, treating it as wondrous medicine to nourish my body.
I contemplate the aim of Buddhahood, accepting and consuming this food in order to accomplish it.

The food is then offered to the Three Jewels before eating. Like breakfast, the meal is eaten in silence until a gong is rung halfway through, to reflect on the five contemplations and that day's teachings. Lunch is the main meal, as many monastics do not eat in the evening. The Abbey is vegetarian and, following the monastic precepts of the Chinese tradition, avoids onions, garlic, leeks, and radishes. Community members take turns cooking. Guests sometimes help as well.

There is another period of offering service in the afternoon (2-4:30), followed by a short, informal ‘medicine meal’ at 6:00 p.m. Evening practice begins at 7:00 pm and lasts an hour and a half. Subsequently, people read or meditate in their rooms.

== Monastic education ==
The daily schedule forms one aspect of monastic training at Sravasti Abbey. In addition, there is a yearly program of weekly teachings as well as various teaching and meditation retreats.

== Friends of Sravasti Abbey ==
In keeping with the traditional interdependent relationship between lay and monastic practitioners, Friends of Sravasti Abbey (FOSA) was developed as a network of lay supporters who supply the Sangha with the four requisites: food, shelter, clothing, and medicine. FOSA has three branches: one in North America, one in Singapore, and one in Russia. In order to cultivate this interdependence, the monastics only eat the food that has been offered by lay support.

== Sravasti Abbey Friends Education (SAFE) ==
Sravasti Abbey also offers an online distance education program, Sravasti Abbey Friends Education (SAFE). Each module is a 12-week set of teachings that help students to deepen their spiritual practice through Buddhist study and meditation, and strengthen their connection with Thubten Chodron and Sravasti Abbey. Each SAFE course involves:

- Weekly assigned teachings in video, audio, or written formats
- Weekly group discussions, facilitated online or locally if there is a SAFE group near you
- Daily meditation practice
- Keeping a portfolio of written reflections that facilitators give feedback on

The course features teachings by the Abbey's abbess, Ven. Thubten Chodron. Videos and commentaries by her teachers are also included: the Dalai Lama, Khensur Jampa Tegchok, Kyabje Zopa Rinpoche, Geshe Sonam Rinchen, and others. Course facilitators include monastics, monastic trainees, and long-term students who have progressed through the SAFE program.

Course participation requires about 3–5 hours of weekly study and at least 20 minutes of daily meditation. SAFE is offered freely.

== See also ==
- International Congress on Buddhist Women's Role in the Sangha
