= Alexander Berzin (scholar) =

American scholar of Tibetan Buddhism (born 1944)

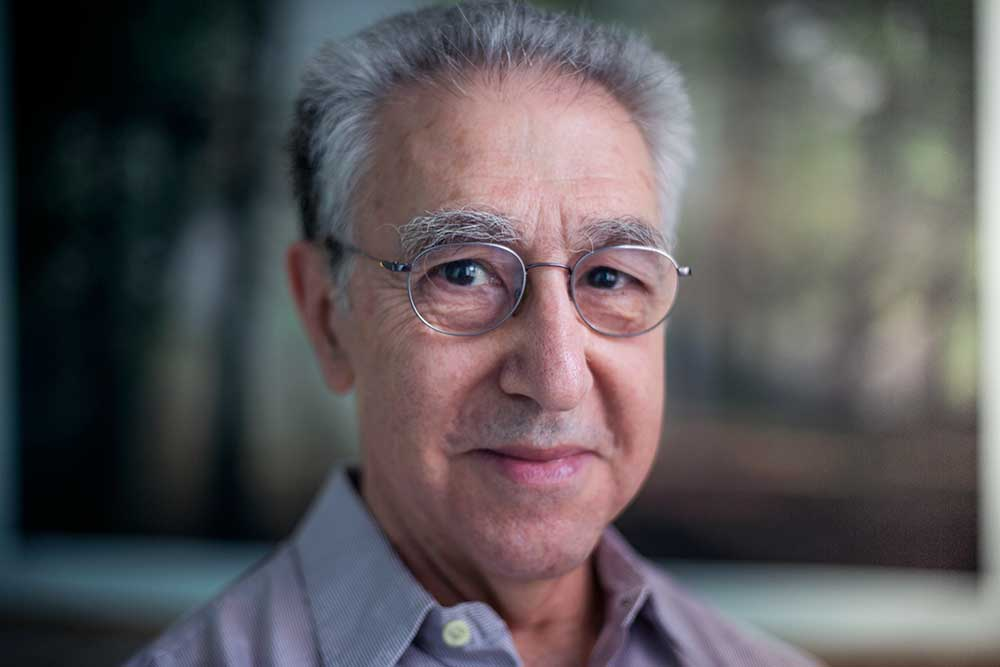
- Alexander Berzin, April 2015

Personal life
- Born: 1944 (age 81–82) Paterson, New Jersey
- Notable work(s): Relating to a Spiritual Teacher: Building a Healthy Relationship (2000), Developing Balanced Sensitivity (1998), Gelug/Kagyu Tradition of Mahamudra (1997), Taking the Kalachakra Initiation (1997)
- Education: Ph.D., Harvard University (1972); MA, Harvard University (1967); BA, Rutgers University (1965)
- Website: studybuddhism.com

Religious life
- Religion: Tibetan Buddhism

Alexander Berzin (born 1944) is a scholar, translator, and teacher of Tibetan Buddhism.

== Early years ==
Berzin was born in Paterson, New Jersey, United States. He received his B.A. degree in 1965 from the Department of Oriental Studies, Rutgers University; his M.A. in 1967; and, his Ph.D. in 1972 from the Departments of Far Eastern Languages (Chinese) and Sanskrit and Indian Studies, Harvard University.

== Work ==
His main teacher was Tsenzhab Serkong Rinpoche, an assistant tutor of the Dalai Lama. Berzin served as the Dalai Lama's archivist and occasionally his interpreter.

In 1998, Berzin moved back to the West and devotes most of his time to preparing his unpublished materials for his Study Buddhism website. The website was chosen in 2011 to be archived as part of the Bodleian Electronic Archives and Manuscripts collection of the University of Oxford.

Berzin is on the Board of Advisors of Tibet House Germany and the International Center for Buddhist-Muslim Understanding of the College of Religious Studies of Mahidol University, Thailand.

He currently lives in Berlin, Germany.

== Bibliography ==
- (Co-editor with John Bray) Kuleshov, Nikolai S. Russia's Tibet File. Dharamsala: Library of Tibetan Works and Archives, 1996. ISBN 8186470050.
- (Coauthor with the 14th Dalai Lama, Translator, and Editor), The Gelug/Kagyu Tradition of Mahamudra. Ithaca, Snow Lion, 1997. ISBN 9781559399302.
- Taking the Kalachakra Initiation. Ithaca: Snow Lion, 1997. ISBN 1559390840. Reprinted as Introduction to the Kalachakra Initiation. Ithaca: Snow Lion, 2010. ISBN 9781559397384.
- Developing Balanced Sensitivity. Ithaca: Snow Lion, 1998. ISBN 9781559399937.
- Kalachakra and Other Six-Session Yoga Texts. Ithaca: Snow Lion, 1998. ISBN 9781559399968.
- Relating to a Spiritual Teacher: Building a Healthy Relationship. Ithaca, Snow Lion, 2000. ISBN 9781559399838. Reprinted as Wise Teacher, Wise Student: Tibetan Approaches to a Healthy Relationship. Ithaca: Snow Lion, 2012.
- "A Buddhist View of Islam" in Islam and Interfaith Relations: The Gerald Weisfeld Lectures 2006 (Perry Schmidt-Leukel and Lloyd Ridgeon, eds.). London: SCM Press, 2007, 187–203. ISBN 9780334041320.
- "The Sources of Happiness According to Buddhism" in Glück (Andre Holenstein, Ruth Meyer Schweizer, Pasqualina Perrig-Chiello, Peter Rusterholz, Christian von Zimmermann, Andreas Wagner, Sara Margarita Zwahlen, eds.). Bern, Stuttgart, Wien, Haupt Verlag, 2011, 41–52. ISBN 9783258076898.
