= Nishad (film) =

- Directed by: Shaji N. Karun
- Screenplay by: Shaji N. Karun; Valsalan-Vathussery
- Produced by: Sukhwant Dhadda
- Starring: Rajit Kapoor; Archana; Geshe Thupten Phelgye; Ram Gopal Bajaj; Rameshwari
- Cinematography: Hari Nair
- Edited by: A. Sreekar Prasad
- Music by: Isaac Thomas Kottukapally
- Release date: September 2002
- Running time: 118 minutes
- Country: India
- Language: Hindi

Nishad (English title: Octave) is a 2002 Indian Hindi film directed by Shaji N. Karun with Archana, Rajit Kapur, Geshe Thupten Phelgye, Master Jhang Ray, Ram Gopal Bajaj, and Rameshwari in the lead roles.

The film premiered at the Fukuoka International Film Festival in September 2002 in Japan and was subsequently showcased at over ten additional international film festivals. It was also selected for the Indian Panorama section at the International Film Festival of India.

== Plot ==
Sati Gujaral is a music teacher in a school for Tibetan children run by the Tibetan government-in-exile. Her husband Gopi Gujaral is a doctor in a government hospital. Their only son, Ashok, is a pilot with the Indian Air Force.

The atmosphere is tense with the possibility of a war between India and Pakistan. Ashok calls home unerringly every week bringing joy and some comfort to his anxious mother. One day she gets a call from a boy trying desperately to reach his mother. The anxiety is compounded when her own son's call doesn't arrive at the appointed hour. The next call reveals that the child has died.

== Cast ==
- Archana as Sati Gujaral
- Rajit Kapoor as Dr. Gopi Gujaral
- Geshe Thupten Phelgye as Senior Monk
- Master Jhang as Junior Monk
- Dominique de Gasquet as French Lady Musician
- Ram Gopal Bajaj
- Rameshwari
