= Thubten Chodron =

American Tibetan Buddhist nun, author, teacher; founder and abbess of Sravasti Abbey

Thubten Chodron 釋德林
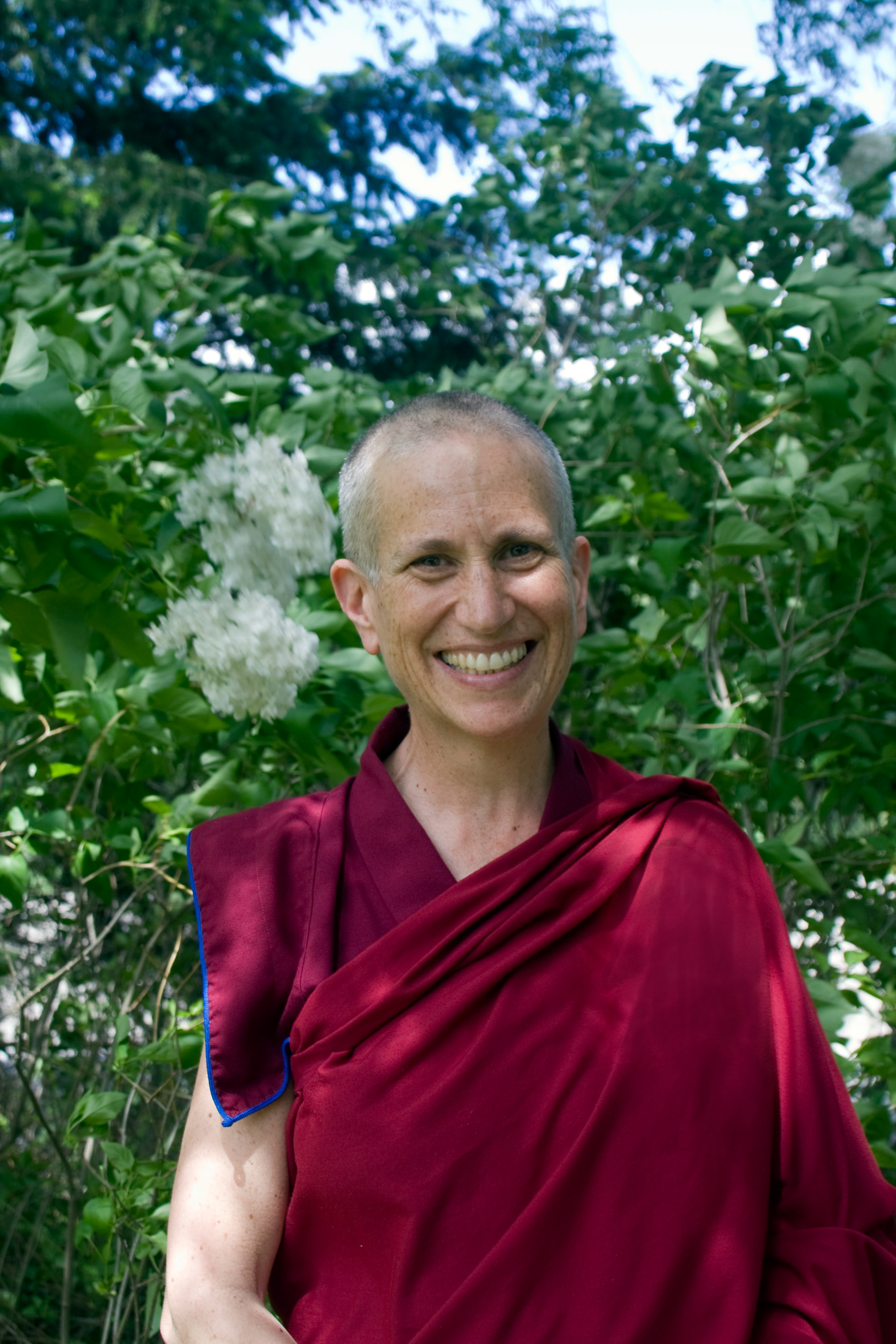
- Thubten Chodron
- Title: Venerable

Personal life
- Born: Cheryl Greene; September 18, 1950 (age 76) Chicago, Illinois, U.S.

Religious life
- Religion: Tibetan Buddhism
- School: Gelug

Thubten Chodron (德林 — De Lin), born Cheryl Greene, is an American Tibetan Buddhist nun, author, teacher, and the founder and abbess of Sravasti Abbey, the only Tibetan Buddhist training monastery for Western nuns and monks in the United States. Chodron is a central figure in the reinstatement of the Bhikshuni (Tib. Gelongma) ordination of women. She is a student of the 14th Dalai Lama, Tsenzhab Serkong Rinpoche, Lama Thubten Yeshe, Thubten Zopa Rinpoche, and other Tibetan masters. She has published many books on Buddhist philosophy and meditation, and is co-authoring with the Dalai Lama a multi-volume series of teachings on the Buddhist path, The Library of Wisdom and Compassion.

== Biography ==
Born in 1950, Thubten Chodron grew up in a "non-religious Jewish" family near Los Angeles, California, and earned her B.A. in history from University of California at Los Angeles in 1971. After traveling through Europe, North Africa and Asia for one and a half years, she received a teaching credential and went to the University of Southern California to do post-graduate work in education while working as a teacher in the Los Angeles City School System. In 1975, she attended a meditation course given by Lama Thubten Yeshe and Kyabje Thubten Zopa Rinpoche, and subsequently went to Kopan Monastery in Nepal to continue studying Buddhism. In 1977 she was ordained as a Buddhist nun by Kyabje Ling Rinpoche in Dharamshala, and in 1986 she received bhikshuni (full) ordination in Taiwan.

Chodron has studied and practiced Buddhism in the Tibetan tradition extensively in India and Nepal under the guidance of the 14th Dalai Lama, Tsenzhab Serkong Rinpoche, Lama Thubten Yeshe, Thubten Zopa Rinpoche and other Tibetan masters and for three years at Dorje Pamo Monastery in France. She directed the spiritual program at Istituto Lama Tzong Khapa in Italy for nearly two years, was resident teacher at Amitabha Buddhist Centre in Singapore, and for 10 years was spiritual director and resident teacher at Dharma Friendship Foundation in Seattle, US.

Emphasizing the practical application of the Buddha's teachings in daily life, Chodron tries to explain them in ways easily understood and practised by Westerners. She has worked on re-establishing the Bhikshuni lineage of Buddhist nuns, cultivating interfaith dialogue, and Dharma outreach in prisons. Seeing the importance and necessity of a monastery for Westerners training in the Tibetan Buddhist tradition, she founded Sravasti Abbey, a Buddhist monastic community north of Spokane, Washington, and is the abbess there. It is the only Tibetan Buddhist training monastery for Western monks and nuns in America.

Chodron is also author of 29 books and editor of 23 books on Buddhism, including eleven works co-written with the 14th Dalai Lama: Buddhism: One Teacher, Many Traditions and The Library of Wisdom and Compassion, a ten-volume collection presenting the Dalai Lama's comprehensive explanation of the Buddhist path. Other popular works include Buddhism for Beginners; Open Heart, Clear Mind; Working with Anger; and Don't Believe Everything You Think.

Chodron was a co-organizer of Life as a Western Buddhist Nun, an international conference of Western Buddhist nuns held in 1996. She was a participant in the 1993 and 1994 Western Buddhist teachers' conferences with the 14th Dalai Lama, and she was instrumental in the creation of the 2007 International Congress on Buddhist Women's Role in the Sangha. She is a member of the Committee for Bhikshuni Ordination and attends the annual Western Buddhist Monastic Gathering in the US. Keen on interfaith dialogue, she was present during the Jewish delegation's visit to Dharamshala in 1990, which was the basis for Rodger Kamenetz’s The Jew in the Lotus, and she attended the Second Gethsemani Encounter in 2002. She has been present at several Mind and Life Institute conferences in which the 14th Dalai Lama dialogues with Western scientists.

Chodron travels worldwide to teach the Dharma: North America, Latin America, Singapore, Malaysia, India, and the former Soviet countries. Seeing the importance and necessity of a monastery for Westerners training in the Tibetan Buddhist tradition, she founded Sravasti Abbey, a Buddhist monastery in Newport, Washington, US, in 2003, and became its abbess.

In 2016 she was awarded the Global Bhikkhuni Award, presented by the Chinese Buddhist Bhikkhuni Association of Taiwan.

== Teaching schedule ==
Chodron permanently resides at Sravasti Abbey in Washington, US, when she is not on her international teaching tours.

The abbey has a program of weekly teachings as well as other one-day events, courses, and meditation retreats:

- Weekly teachings, which are broadcast via livestream and posted on the Sravasti Abbey YouTube channel;
- Annual 'Young Adults Explore Buddhism' program;
- Annual 'Exploring Monastic Life' three-week residential program for those thinking about becoming a Buddhist monk or nun;
- Annual month-long winter retreat;
- Various other courses and retreats.

== Bibliography ==
Authored / Co-authored by Chodron:

- Open Heart, Clear Mind. Paperback 224 pages; Publisher: Snow Lion (an imprint of Shambhala); (1990) ISBN 0-937938-87-4
- What Color Is Your Mind? Paperback 288 pages; Publisher: Snow Lion (an imprint of Shambhala); (1993) ISBN 1-55939-015-8
- The Path to Happiness. PDF 68 pages; Publisher: Amitabha Buddhist Centre; (1999) ISBN 981041336X
- Buddhism for Beginners. Paperback 160 pages; Publisher: Snow Lion (an imprint of Shambhala); (2001) ISBN 1-55939-153-7
- Working with Anger. Paperback 170 pages; Publisher: Snow Lion (an imprint of Shambhala); (2001) ISBN 1-55939-163-4
- Taming the Mind. Paperback 230 pages; Publisher: Snow Lion (an imprint of Shambhala); (2004) ISBN 1-55939-221-5
- How to Free Your Mind: Tara the Liberator. Paperback 224 pages; Publisher: Snow Lion (an imprint of Shambhala); (2005) ISBN 1-55939-226-6
- Transforming Our Daily Activities: A Practical Guide To Practising Buddhism In Daily Life. PDF 98 pages; Publisher: Kong Meng San Phor Kark See Monastery, Dharma Propagation Division, Awaken Publishing and Design; (2005) ISBN 9789810530037
- Cultivating a Compassionate Heart: The Yoga Method of Chenrezig. Paperback 155 pages; Publisher: Snow Lion (an imprint of Shambhala); (2006) ISBN 1-55939-242-8
- Guided Buddhist Meditations: Essential Practices on the Stages of the Path. Paperback 224 pages; Publisher: Shambhala; (2019) ISBN 978-1611807301 [Original title: Guided Meditations on the Stages of the Path (2007) ISBN 1-55939-281-9]
- Dealing with Life's Issues: A Buddhist Perspective. PDF 192 pages; Publisher: Kong Meng San Phor Kark See Monastery, Dharma Propagation Division, Awaken Publishing and Design; (2008) ISBN 9789810593957
- Don't Believe Everything You Think: Living With Wisdom and Compassion. Paperback 256 pages; Publisher: Snow Lion (an imprint of Shambhala); (2013) ISBN 9781559393966
- Timeless Wisdom: Being the Knowing. NTSC DVD 109 minutes; Producer: Sweet Corn Productions; (2013) ASIN B00B79WPCY
- Living with an Open Heart: How to Cultivate Compassion in Everyday Life. Co-authored with Russell Kolts, PhD. Paperback 400 pages; Publisher: Robinson Publishing; (2013) ISBN 9781780335421
- Buddhism: One Teacher, Many Traditions. Co-authored with His Holiness the 14th Dalai Lama. Hardcover 352 pages; Publisher: Wisdom Publications; (2014) ISBN 9781614291275
- An Open-Hearted Life: Transformative Methods for Compassionate Living from a Clinical Psychologist and a Buddhist Nun. Co-authored with Russell Kolts, PhD. Paperback 272 pages; Publisher: Shambhala; (2015) ISBN 9781611802115
- Seven Tips for a Happy Life. PDF 38 pages; Publisher: Kong Meng San Phor Kark See Monastery, Dharma Propagation Division, Awaken Publishing and Design; (2015) ISBN 9789810955892
- Good Karma: How to Create the Causes of Happiness and Avoid the Causes of Suffering. Paperback 272 pages; Publisher: Shambhala; 1 edition (2016); ISBN 978-1611803396
- The Compassionate Kitchen: Buddhist Practices for Eating with Mindfulness and Gratitude. Paperback 160 pages; Publisher: Shambhala; (2018); ISBN 978-1611806342
- Unlocking Your Potential, co-authored with Calvin Malone.146 pages; Publisher: (2019); ISBN 978-0985849894
- Awaken Every Day: 365 Buddhist Reflections to Invite Mindfulness and Joy. Paperback 400 pages; Publisher: Shambhala; (2019); ISBN 978-1611807165
- 365 Gems of Wisdom. PDF 516 pages; Publisher: Kong Meng San Phor Kark See Monastery, Dharma Propagation Division, Awaken Publishing and Design; (2023); ISBN 978-981-18-2623-8
- The Library of Wisdom and Compassion, co-authored with His Holiness the 14th Dalai Lama.
  - Approaching the Buddhist Path. Hardcover 360 pages; Publisher: Wisdom Publications; (2017); ISBN 978-1614294412
  - The Foundation of Buddhist Practice. Hardcover 400 pages; Publisher: Wisdom Publications; (2018); ISBN 978-1614295204
  - Samsara, Nirvana, and Buddha Nature. Hardcover 440 pages; Publisher: Wisdom Publications; (2019); ISBN 978-1614295365
  - Following in the Buddha's Footsteps. Hardcover 552 pages; Publisher: Wisdom Publications; (2019); ISBN 978-1614296256
  - In Praise of Great Compassion. Hardcover 420 pages; Publisher: Wisdom Publications; (2020); ISBN 978-1614296829
  - Courageous Compassion. Hardcover 496 pages; Publisher: Wisdom Publications; (2021); ISBN 978-1614297475
  - Searching for the Self. Hardcover 456 pages; Publisher: Wisdom Publications; (2022); ISBN 978-1614297956
  - Realizing the Profound View. Hardcover 616 pages; Publisher: Wisdom Publications; (2022); ISBN 978-626-9549856
  - Appearing and Empty. Hardcover 544 pages; Publisher: Wisdom Publications; (2023); ISBN 978-161-42988-7-8
  - Vajrayana and the Culmination of the Path. Hardcover 464 pages; Publisher: Wisdom Publications; (2024); ISBN 978-161-4299578
- The Key of Compassion. Paperback 308 pages; Publisher: Sravasti Abbey; (2025); ISBN 979-898-8226680
- All-Embracing Good: Bodhisattva Aspirations That Uplift the Heart. Paperback 288 pages; Publisher: Shambhala; (2027); ISBN 978-1645475880

Edited by Chodron:

- Heruka Body Mandala Sadhana and Tsog and Commentary. PDF; Publisher: Sravasti Abbey; (1990) By request from Sravasti Abbey
- Preparing for Ordination. PDF 104 pages; Publisher: Sravasti Abbey; (1996)
- Blossoms of the Dharma: Living as a Buddhist Nun. Paperback 248 pages; Publisher: North Atlantic Books; (1999) ISBN 9781556433252
- A Teaching on Heruka. PDF; Publisher: Lama Yeshe Wisdom Archive; (2000)
- A Teaching on Yamantaka. PDF; Publisher: Lama Yeshe Wisdom Archive; (2000)
- Choosing Simplicity: A Commentary on the Bhikshuni Pratimoksha. Paperback 300 pages; Publisher: Snow Lion (an imprint of Shambhala); (2001) ISBN 9781559391559
- Transforming Adversity Into Joy and Courage. Paperback 320 pages; Publisher: Snow Lion (an imprint of Shambhala); (2005) ISBN 9781559392327
- Pearl of Wisdom Buddhist Prayers and Practices: Book I. Spiral-bound 104 pages; Publisher: Sravasti Abbey; Sixth edition (2011) ISBN 9780985849801
- Insight Into Emptiness. Paperback 296 pages; Publisher: Wisdom Publications; (2012); ISBN 9781614290131
- Pearl of Wisdom Buddhist Prayers and Practices: Book II. Spiral-bound 95 pages; Publisher: Sravasti Abbey; Sixth edition (2014) ISBN 9780985849825
- Karmans for the Creation of Virtue: The Prescriptive Precepts in the Dharmaguptaka Vinaya. Paperback 314 pages; Publisher: Sravasti Abbey; (2015) ISBN 9781508456070
- Practical Ethics and Profound Emptiness: A Commentary on Nagarjuna's Precious Garland. Paperback 440 pages; Publisher: Wisdom Publications; (2017) ISBN 978-1614293248 [Note: This is the first complete English-language commentary on Nagarjuna's Precious Garland of Advice for a King.]
- Dharmaguptaka Vinaya Series
  - Bhikṣu Poṣadha and Rites to Establish the Territory. PDF 80 pages; Publisher: Sravasti Abbey; (2017) ISBN 978-0-9858498-3-2
  - Bhikṣuṇī Poṣadha and Rites to Establish the Territory. PDF 86 pages; Publisher: Sravasti Abbey; (2017) ISBN 978-0-9858498-4-9
  - Pravrajyā and Śikṣamāṇā Ordination Rites. PDF 53 pages; Publisher: Sravasti Abbey; (2017) ISBN 978-0-9858498-7-0
  - Śikṣamāṇā Poṣadha and Other Rites. PDF 48 pages; Publisher: Sravasti Abbey; (2017) ISBN 978-0-9858498-5-6
  - Teachings and Rites for Śrāmaṇerī/as. PDF 70 pages; Publisher: Sravasti Abbey; (2017) ISBN 978-0-9858498-6-3
  - Varṣā, Pravāraṇā, and Kaṭhina Rites. PDF 108 pages; Publisher: Sravasti Abbey; (2017) ISBN 978-0-9858498-8-7
- Refuge Resource Book. PDF 92 pages; Publisher: Sravasti Abbey; (2018)
- Exploring Monastic Life. PDF 94 pages; Publisher: Sravasti Abbey; (2019)
- Building Community: Living and Learning with the Sangha. Paperback 224 pages; Publisher: Sravasti Abbey; (2019) ISBN 978-1689642057
- Pearl of Wisdom Buddhist Prayers and Practices: Book III. PDF 80 pages; Publisher: Sravasti Abbey; First edition (2020)
- Gavin Discovers the Secret to Happiness. Paperback 44 pages; Publisher: Sravasti Abbey; (2021) ISBN 979-8535642055
- Living the Vinaya: An Introduction to Karmans and Skandhakas. Paperback 304 pages; Publisher: Sravasti Abbey; (2023) ISBN 979-8-9882266-0-4
- Driving the Dharma Home. Paperback 216 pages: Publisher: Sravasti Abbey; (2025) ISBN 979-8-9882266-2-8

== See also ==
- Sravasti Abbey
- Ordination of Women in Buddhism
- Buddhism in the United States
- Bhikkhuni
