= Kee Nanayon =

Thai Buddhist upāsikā (1901–1978)

Upasika Kee Nanayon

Upasika Kee Nanayon (Thai: กี นานายน) or Kor Khao-suan-luang (ก. เขาสวนหลวง) was a Thai Buddhist upāsikā (devout laywoman) from Ratchaburi (1901 - 1978). After her retirement in 1945, she turned her home into a Samatha-vipassanā Anapanasati meditation centre with her aunt and uncle. She was mostly self-taught, reading the Pali Canon, Sutta Piṭaka and other Buddhist texts. Her Dhamma talks and poetry were widely circulated. As word of her spread, she became one of the most popular female Bhāvanā meditation Ajahns in Thailand. Many of her talks have been translated into English by Thanissaro Bhikkhu, who sees her as "arguably the foremost woman Dhamma teacher in twentieth-century Thailand".

== Publications ==
- Upasika K. Nanayon, An unentangled knowing: lessons in training the mind, Buddhist Publication Society, 1996.
- Upasika Kee Nanayon, Thanissaro Bhikkhu, Pure and simple: teachings of a Thai Buddhist laywoman, Somerville, 2005
- "Breath Meditation Condensed".
