= Tsenzhab Serkong Rinpoche =

- Title: Rinpoche, Geshe

Personal life
- Born: July 27, 1914 Lhoka, Kingdom of Tibet
- Died: August 29, 1983 (aged 69) Kibber, Himachal Pradesh, India
- Known for: Tonglen

Religious life
- Religion: Buddhism
- School: Gelug

Senior posting
- Teacher: Serkong Dorje Chang
- Predecessor: Darmadodey (a son of Marpa)
- Successor: Serkong Rinpoche
- Disciples: 14th Dalai Lama, Thubten Chodron

Tsenzhab Serkong Rinpoche (July 27, 1914, Tibet—August 29, 1983, Spiti Valley, India) was a master (tsenshab) of Tibetan Buddhism from the Gelug tradition. At the age of 34 in 1948 he was appointed from Ganden Jangtsey Monastery near Lhasa as one of seven teachers for the Dalai Lama.

== Duties with the Dalai Lama ==
Having joined the 14th Dalai Lama in Dharamsala India in 1959, Rinpoche taught the Dalai Lama through debates about Buddhist teachings until Rinpoche's death in August 1983. He assisted the 14th Dalai Lama in prayers for the benefit of the world.

Rinpoche assisted in reestablishing in India's many Buddhist monasteries and their rituals, otherwise destroyed in the Chinese invasion of Tibet.

== Travels ==
Rinpoche traveled in India, Nepal, Western Europe and North America. Over five visits to Spiti, the Himalayan valley next to Kinnaur, Rinpoche rededicated the most ancient monastery, Tabo Gonpa, and conferred on its monks the empowerments and oral transmissions for its traditional rituals. He imported learned spiritual teachers and founded a school for the local children.

Rinpoche used the offerings he received during his Western tours to commission a large applique scroll portraying the Buddha-figure Kalachakra and a full set of scroll-paintings of the life of Tsongkhapa, which he presented to his monastery, Ganden Jangtsey. He also made extensive offerings to the monks and nuns gathered at Drepung Monastery, Mundgod, in March 1983 for the first full Monlam prayer festival.

== Death and reincarnation ==
According to Alexander Berzin, Rinpoche died while practicing tonglen to take on obstacles faced by the Dalai Lama. He died in village Kibber, Spiti valley, Himachal Pradesh. In 1986, a two-year old boy from village Lari, Spiti valley, was recognised as the reincarnation of Tsenzhab Serkhong Rinpoche. He is now formally known as Tsenzhab Serkhong Rinpoche II, and is the spiritual head of Spiti's ancient Tabo monastery.
