= Vultum Dei quaerere =

Vultum Dei quaerere Latin for 'Seeking the Face of God' Apostolic constitution of Pope Francis
- Signature date: 29 June 2016
- Subject: Women's contemplative life
- Text: In Latin; In English

Vultum Dei quaerere (Latin for Seeking the Face of God) is an apostolic constitution issued by Pope Francis on 29 June 2016, regarding women's contemplative life.

== Contents ==
Francis devotes a chapter to praise of the vocation to the contemplative life. He reflects on 12 aspects of the contemplative life which may help contemplative women achieve the goals of their vocation, namely: "formation, prayer, the word of God, the sacraments of the Eucharist and Reconciliation, fraternal life in community, federations, the cloister, work, silence, the communications media and asceticism." He notes in conclusion that nuns are needed by the "world and the Church" as "beacons of light for the journey of the men and women of our time".

The constitution establishes new rules governing women's contemplative life, emphasizing the importance of the God-centered nature of monastic life. It also establishes new provisions for federation of contemplative communities. Those portions of canon law which are in conflict with Vultum Dei quaerare were partially repealed by the constitution; in particular, Francis cited portions of Pope Pius XII's apostolic constitution Sponsa Christi as well as portions of the instructions Inter Praeclara, published in 1950, and Verbi Sponsa, published in 1999.

Particular attention was given to ongoing, recommending that monasteries cooperate and share resources, and to this end encouraged federation with other communities.

== Publication ==
During the Vatican press briefing during which Vultum Dei quaerere was presented to the public, Archbishop José Rodríguez Carballo, O.F.M., secretary of the Congregation for Institutes of Consecrated Life and Societies of Apostolic Life, remarked that

in outlining the essential elements [of the contemplative life] there is no lack of explicit references to contemplative women, to whom there is presented the icon of Mary as summa contemplatrix [i.e. the greatest contemplator], "Mary, Virgin, Bride and Mother, who welcomes and treasures the Word in order to give it back to the world ... to help to bring Christ to birth and increase in the hearts of men and women".

== Instruction Cor Orans ==
The Congregation for Institutes of Consecrated Life and Societies of Apostolic Life published the document Cor Orans in 2018 to implement Vultum Dei quaerere.
