= Edo Belli =

American architect

Edo Jesualdo Belli (1918 – August 26, 2003) was an American modernist architect based in Chicago.

== Biography ==
Belli was born on Chicago's North Side and attended Lane Technical High School. He apprenticed with the Holsman & Holsman firm while attending the Armour Institute of Technology in the evenings. He graduated in 1939. Belli also worked for Perkins and Will, briefly for Graham, Anderson, Probst & White, and served in Guam as a member of the United States Navy Construction Battalion (the Seabees) during World War II.

Joined by his brother Anthony, early in his career Belli formed a lasting relationship with Chicago Archbishop Samuel Stritch, and won commissions for many churches and schools in the growing archdiocese. The Archbishop supported Belli's early commitment to innovative engineering and a decidedly modernist style.

Archbishop Stritch also introduced Belli to financier John F. Cuneo Sr. Cuneo hired Belli for multiple major projects, including the 1957 Frank Cuneo Memorial Hospital, mall developments in Niles Illinois, Houston, and Scottsdale Arizona, and work at Cuneo's dairy/amusement park Hawthorn Mellody Farms. As of mid-2013 the Frank Cuneo Hospital complex is the focus of a preservation battle.

Among hundreds of projects, with significant international work, Belli's single major work is likely the 13-story St. Joseph's Hospital (now Ascension Saint Joseph) at 2900 N. Lake Shore Drive, completed in 1963.

Belli died in Lake Forest, Illinois, on August 26, 2003. His sons Allen and James continue to operate Belli & Belli as a family-run firm, primarily specializing in healthcare, manufacturing and commercial work.

== Work ==
- Blue Cloud Abbey, Marvin, South Dakota, 1949
- Marmion Abbey, Aurora, Illinois, multiple buildings, 1950
- St. Patrick's High School, 5900 W. Belmont, Chicago, 1952-1956
- multiple buildings, Notre Dame High School for Boys, Niles, Illinois, 1956
- St. Gertrude Church, Franklin Park, Illinois, 1952–53
- The Miracle House, 2001 N. Nordica, an official Chicago Landmark, 1954
- St. Nicholas School, Aurora, Illinois, AIA award, 1957
- Frank Cuneo Children's Hospital, Chicago, 1957
- School at the St. Stanislaus Kostka Church, Chicago, 1959
- Moreau Seminary, University of Notre Dame, Notre Dame, Indiana, 1959
- multiple buildings on the Marillac College campus, Normandy, Missouri, now part of the University of Missouri–St. Louis, circa 1960
- St. William Church & Rectory Chicago, Chicago, 1960
- Immaculate Conception Church, Pittsburgh, Pa, 1961
- St. Joseph’s Hospital, 2900 N. Lake Shore Drive, Chicago, 1963
- Golf Mill Professional Building (round 10-story tower), Golf Mill Shopping Center, Niles Illinois, 1963, with the Mill Run Playhouse, 1965 (playhouse razed 1984)
- Clelian Heights School for Exceptional Children, Greensburg, Pennsylvania, 1968
- Camelview Plaza, Scottsdale, Arizona, including Sakowitz, Bullock’s, an 11-story Arizona Bank Tower, and Camelview Cinema, 1974. Now merged into Scottsdale Fashion Square.
- Frank Cuneo Memorial Hospital Extended Care Facility, Chicago, Illinois, 1975
- St. Benedict the African Church, Englewood, Illinois, 1987
