= Dave Ortega =

American comics artist

- Born: El Paso, Texas, U.S.
- Area: Comics artist
- Notable works: Abuela y Los Dead Mexicans (2011); Hacienda (2013); Días de Consuelo (2015–2020; 2021)
- Collaborators: The Miracle 5
- Awards: The Best American Comics notable comic (2012); Comics Workbook Composition Competition winner (2013); Andy Warhol Foundation for the Visual Arts grant (2021); Brother Thomas Fellow (2025)

Dave Ortega is an American comics artist whose work examines the human impact of the Mexican Revolution and Spanish colonization through family narratives. The Best American Comics named his Abuela y Los Dead Mexicans (transl. Grandma and the Dead Mexicans) a notable comic. He released Días de Consuelo (transl. Days of Consuelo), about his grandmother's life, in six self-published issues before Radiator Comics published it as a graphic novel. Publishers Weekly praised it as "deeply personal and affecting."

Ortega's work appears in several comics anthologies, and is in the permanent collections of the Billy Ireland Cartoon Library & Museum and the Lucas Museum of Narrative Art. In 2016, he created a life-size interactive installation for the Institute of Contemporary Art, Boston, and in 2025, Ortega was named a Brother Thomas Fellow of The Boston Foundation.

== Early life and education ==
Ortega grew up in El Paso, Texas, where he played video games as a child. He was not introduced to comics until he attended the University of Texas at El Paso.

== Career ==
Ortega read his first graphic novel, Frank Miller's Batman: The Dark Knight Returns, after college. Ortega studied how Miller and Art Spiegelman used panel composition in their storytelling.

Ortega moved to Boston in 2000 to pursue art and illustration. He became part of Somerville's independent comics community and has exhibited with the collaborative group The Miracle 5.

He has taught at the School of the Museum of Fine Arts and Brandeis University. In 2024, he was a visiting artist at the School of the Art Institute of Chicago.

=== Artistic style and influences ===
Ortega's work focuses on Mexican history and the Spanish colonization of the Americas to address ongoing cultural trauma: "It's not a closed loop of history. It's still an open wound." For his research into Mexican history, Ortega has drawn on Eduardo Galeano's Open Veins of Latin America, Frank McLynn's Villa and Zapata, and Friedrich Katz's The Life and Times of Pancho Villa.

His work is characterized by an 8-panel grid and frantic pacing, conveying stress and elevated emotions through detailed facial expressions. The Comics Journal described him as "some kind of narrative virtuoso," praising his clever comic book writing and complex narrative structures. He produces his work using brushes and Micron pens for inking, then colors the drawings digitally.

Ortega has cited George Herriman's Krazy Kat, Ernie Bushmiller's Nancy, and E. C. Segar's Popeye as inspirational works, as well as the artists Lynda Barry, Kate Beaton, Jordan Crane, Michael DeForge, Michel Fiffe, Simon Hanselmann, Jaime Hernández, Noah Van Sciver, Dash Shaw, and Jillian Tamaki.

=== Días de Consuelo ===
Cover of Días de Consuelo No. 1 (2015)

In fall 2015, Ortega self-published the first issue of Días de Consuelo, chronicling the life of his grandmother Consuelo Castañón Herrera, who was born in 1914 during the Mexican Revolution. The work incorporates historical figures including Pancho Villa, Emiliano Zapata, and President Venustiano Carranza, showing how the revolution affected daily life while focusing on women's experiences rather than battlefield action. Ortega crafted the story from family lore and historical sources.

The six-issue series concluded in 2020. The complete work was published as a graphic novel in 2021.

=== Exhibitions and installations ===
Ortega regularly exhibits at comics and art book fairs throughout North America, including the Chicago Alternative Comics Expo, the Latino Comics Expo, the Massachusetts Independent Comics Expo (MICE) and Mini-MICE, the NY Art Book Fair, the Small Press Expo, and the Toronto Comic Arts Festival.

In addition to his comics, Ortega creates wearable art. He participated in a collaborative silk-screening project at the NY Art Book Fair at MoMA PS1 and exhibited in the group show "Beyond the Fluff & Fold: Contemporary Artists & the T-Shirt" at The Art Institute of Boston, displaying work from his "Tees from the Future" series featuring characters from his comics.

He has also created immersive experiences, including the interactive installation Comics: Frame by Frame at the Institute of Contemporary Art, Boston, which featured movable black-and-white panels that visitors could rearrange to create narratives, with paper speech bubbles available to add dialogue. Ortega appeared at the museum to collaborate with visitors. The installation addressed how people construct narratives from fragmented information, a problem Ortega had faced when documenting his grandmother's story.

== Awards ==
- 2012 – Abuela y Los Dead Mexicans named a notable comic by The Best American Comics
- 2013 – Hacienda won first place in the Comics Workbook Composition Competition
- 2021 – Grant from Andy Warhol Foundation for the Visual Arts
- 2023 – Días de Consuelo an official selection in the Book Series category for the Society of Illustrators Illustration 65 Annual
- 2025 – Named a Brother Thomas Fellow of The Boston Foundation

== Publications ==
- Abuela y los Dead Mexicans [Grandma and the Dead Mexicans]. Boston: Dave Ortega. 2011. ISBN 978-1-4507-8196-1.
- Insurrectos [Insurgents]. Boston: Dave Ortega. 2012. OCLC 932127037.
- Hacienda. Boston: Dave Ortega. 2013. OCLC 932066248.
- De Narvaez. Boston: Dave Ortega. 2013. OCLC 937780558.
- School of the Americas. Boston: Dave Ortega. 2013. OCLC 937807079.
- Zacatecas 1914 #1. Boston: Dave Ortega. 2013. OCLC 1140548735.
- Zacatecas 1914 #2. Boston: Dave Ortega. 2013. OCLC 1140548790.
- Battle of Juarez MCMXI. Boston: Dave Ortega. 2014. OCLC 937716735.
- Dichos [Sayings] (in Spanish). Boston: Dave Ortega. 2014. OCLC 937817307.
- De las Casas: Selections from "An Account, Much Abbreviated, of the Destruction of the Indies". Boston: Dave Ortega. 2015. OCLC 937695539.
- Días de Fresnillo I [Days of Fresnillo I]. Somerville, Massachusetts: The Miracle Five Press. 2015. OCLC 961484976.
- Días de Fresnillo II [Days of Fresnillo II]. Somerville, Massachusetts: The Miracle Five Press. 2016. OCLC 961484825.
- Here, Knightly. Boston: Institute of Contemporary Art. 2016. OCLC 1091355273.
- Días de Guerra III [Days of War III]. Boston: Dave Ortega. 2018. OCLC 1311415307.
- River. Boston: Dave Ortega. 2019. OCLC 1267718042.
- Días de Adversidad [Days of Adversity]. Boston: Dave Ortega. 2020. OCLC 1311415402.
- Días de Consuelo [Days of Consuelo]. Radiator Comics. 2021. ISBN 978-0-9963989-1-6.
