= Swiss-American Congregation =

Association of Benedictine monasteries

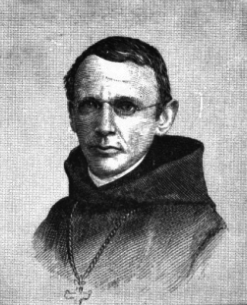
- Abbot Finton Munwiler (First Abbot President)
- Abbreviation: Post-nominal letters: O.S.B.
- Nickname: Benedictines
- Formation: 5 April 1881; 145 years ago
- Founders: Fintan Mundwiler; Frowin Conrad
- Type: Benedictine Congregation
- Region served: North and Central America
- Members: 422 monks as of 2024
- Abbot President: Abbot Justin Brown
- Main organ: Benedictine Confederation
- Affiliations: Roman Catholic Church
- Website: Official website

The Swiss-American Congregation is an association of Benedictine monasteries founded in 1881 in the United States, as a part of the international Benedictine Confederation of monasteries.

== History ==
During the 19th century, a number of Benedictine monasteries had been founded in the United States by monks coming from monasteries in the German-speaking region of Switzerland. The fortunes of Roman Catholic institutions in Switzerland were turbulent, especially in the 19th century. All were dissolved as a consequence of the French Revolution in 1798, but were restored by Napoleonic decree in 1803, with the exception of the Abbey of St. Gall, where the Prince-Abbot refused to make the necessary political concessions. The anti-monastic policies of the Swiss cantons, however, later brought about the dissolution of monasteries in Pfäfers (1838), Muri (1841), Fischingen (1848) and Rheinau (1863).

The outlook for Swiss Roman Catholics during the Kulturkampf was so bleak that the ancient Abbeys of Einsiedeln and Engelberg began a program of establishing new monasteries in the United States, so that the remaining Swiss monasteries would have a refuge if they were all exiled. Those pioneer monks also were to serve the large number of German people who had emigrated there. As their offshoots, these new communities remained a part of the Swiss Confederation of Benedictine monasteries.

By 1881 the number of such communities had grown that it was felt appropriate to separate them from the authority of the mother country. Accordingly, Pope Leo XIII authorized the creation of this congregation on April 5, 1881, under the patronage of the Immaculate Conception of the Blessed Virgin Mary.

== Current status ==
The Congregation, as of 2024, is composed of abbeys and priories throughout the United States, Mexico, Canada, and Guatemala. The Congregation numbers 422 monks.

=== Current members ===
- St. Meinrad Archabbey in St. Meinrad, Indiana
- Conception Abbey in Conception, Missouri
- Subiaco Abbey in Subiaco, Arkansas
- St. Joseph Abbey in Saint Benedict, Louisiana
- Mount Angel Abbey in St. Benedict, Oregon
- Marmion Abbey in Aurora, Illinois
- Westminster Abbey in Mission, British Columbia, Canada
- Mount Michael Abbey in Elkhorn, Nebraska
- Our Lady of Glastonbury Abbey in Hingham, Massachusetts
- Prince of Peace Abbey in Oceanside, California
- St. Benedict Abbey in Still River, Massachusetts
- Monastery of the Ascension in Jerome, Idaho
- Our Lady of the Angels Benedictine Monastery Cuernavaca, Morelos, Mexico
- Abadia de Jesucristo Crucificado in Esquipulas, Guatemala
- Weston Priory in Weston, Vermont (since July 2026)

=== Dependent Priories ===
- Priory of St. Joseph, Guatemala: "The monastery was founded by Marmion Abbey on June 10, 1965, and raised to a dependent priory on November 24, 1967".
- St. Benedict Priory in Benet Lake, Wisconsin: "The monastery was founded by Conception Abbey on March 21, 1945, was raised to a conventual priory on December 15, 1950, and to the status of an abbey on May 24, 1952. On October 23, 2014, the Chapter of St. Benedict’s Abbey voted to become dependent Priory of Conception Abbey. The petition was ratified by Conception Abbey on October 30, 2014. At that time the administration of the abbey passed to the Abbot President. Monks of St. Benedict’s Abbey had the option of transferring their stability to Conception Abbey or remaining monks of St. Benedict’s Abbey".

=== Former Presidents ===
These are the former presidents:

1. Rt. Rev. Fintan Mundwiler, O.S.B. (1881–1898)
2. Rt. Rev. Frowin Conrad, O.S.B. (1898–1922)
3. Rt. Rev. Philip Ruggle, O.S.B. (1922–1936)
4. Rt. Rev. Columban Thuis, O.S.B. (1937–1957)
5. Rt. Rev. Stephen Schappler, O.S.B. (1957–1961)
6. Rt. Rev. Gilbert Hess, O.S.B. (1961–1965)
7. Rt. Rev. David Melancon, O.S.B. (1965–1978)
8. Rt. Rev. Raphael DeSalvo, O.S.B. (1978–1984)
9. Rt. Rev. Jerome Hanus, O.S.B. (1984–1987)
10. Rt. Rev. Patrick Regan, O.S.B. (1987–1999)
11. Rt. Rev. Peter Eberle, O.S.B. (1999–2011)
12. Rt. Rev. Vincent de Paul Bataille, O.S.B. (2011-2023)

=== Current President ===
The current Abbot President is Abbot Justin Brown elected in 2023. He resides at Saint Joseph Abbey (Louisiana) located in Saint Benedict, Louisiana.
