= Blue Cloud Abbey =

20th-century American Benedictine monastery

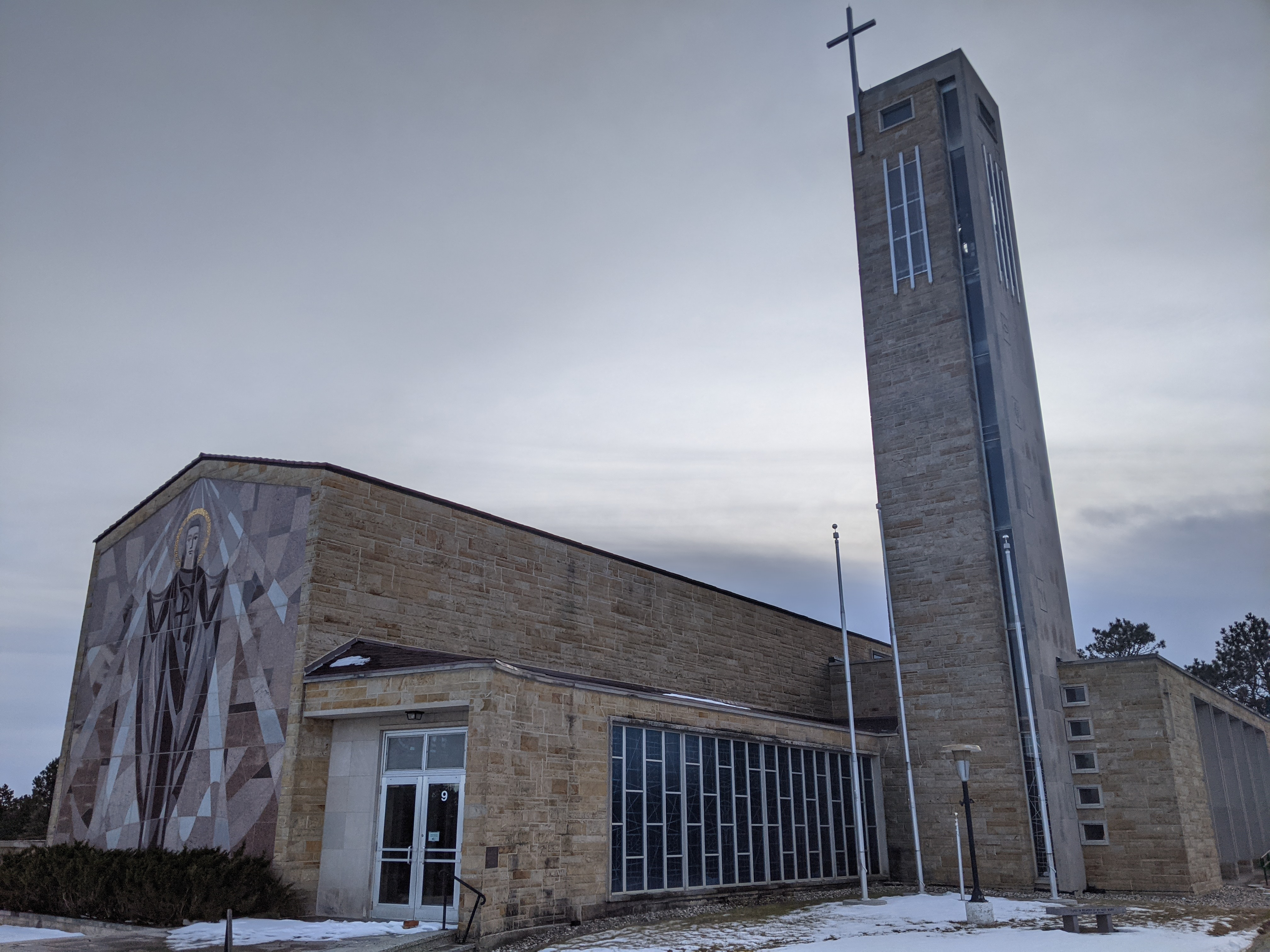
- Exterior of the abbey in 2021

- Location within South Dakota Location within the United States
- Interactive map of Blue Cloud Abbey

Monastery information
- Full name: Our Lady of the Snows Abbey
- Order: Benedictine
- Established: June 24, 1950
- Disestablished: August 5, 2012
- Mother house: St. Meinrad Archabbey
- Dedication: Saint Mary of the Snows
- Diocese: Sioux Falls

Architecture
- Status: Closed
- Functional status: Retreat Center
- Architect: Edo Belli
- Style: Modernist
- Groundbreaking: 1949

Site
- Location: 46561 147th Street, Marvin, SD 57251-0098, United States
- Coordinates: 45°15′03″N 96°53′31″W

Blue Cloud Abbey, formally Our Lady of the Snows Abbey, was an American Benedictine monastery located near the town of Marvin, in Grant County, South Dakota. It was a member of the Swiss-American Congregation. The patron saint of the monastery was the Blessed Virgin Mary under the title of Our Lady of the Snows, from which the abbey derived its name.

The abbey closed in 2012, and a Catholic non-profit purchased the property, which now functions as Abbey of the Hills Inn and Retreat Center.

== History ==
During the first half of the 20th century, the monks of St. Meinrad Archabbey in Indiana had operated four small mission churches in the Dakotas, two in North Dakota and two in South Dakota. Their purpose was to serve the local population of the region, primarily the Native Americans on the Indian reservations, for whom they also operated several schools. In 1949 the monastic chapter decided to establish a new monastery to establish their presence more stably in that region and thereby to permit the full expression of their monastic lives.

To this end, Archabbot Ignatius Esser, O.S.B., assigned four monks to scout the area. While driving to look at one site, they stopped outside the tiny town of Marvin and saw a rolling, wooded string of hills above Whetstone Valley. The land was rocky but they liked it so they went to nearby Milbank to inquire about its availability. They were directed to the local bank, where the president of the bank, Effner Benedict, told them that the land had just been listed for sale 30 minutes earlier. He offered them 300 acres (120 hectares) at $22 an acre. These Benedictines felt that the good timing, combined with the banker's name, were signs which they could not ignore, so they immediately agreed to purchase the land. The abbey was named after a Native American named Blue Cloud who spread the Catholic faith in the area when there were no priests.

Construction began that same year, with the monastic buildings being designed by the Chicago architect Edo Belli. The monastery was formally established on June 24, 1950, as a dependency of St. Meinrad Archabbey. It was raised to the rank of a semi-independent priory on August 5, 1952, and to a fully autonomous abbey on March 21, 1954, with Gilbert Hess, O.S.B., being elected as the community's first abbot. He was installed by Bishop William O. Brady of Sioux Falls on June 24, 1954. Archbishop John Gregory Murray preached the pontifical high Mass. At its peak, there were forty monks in the community.

The abbey church was formally consecrated on October 17, 1967, by Archbishop Leo Binz of the Archdiocese of Saint Paul and Minneapolis.

In 1967, Fr. Stan Maudlin, called Eagle Man by the Dakota, established the American Indian Culture Research Center at the abbey. By the time of the abbey's closing, it had some 40,000 photos and many other artifacts and recorded oral histories. After the abbey's closure, the collection became a part of the Center for Western Studies at Augustana College in Sioux Falls.

It was during the administration of the second abbot, Alan Berndt, O.S.B. (1920–2016), that the abbey reached its highest membership, and carried on a variety of services. He was instrumental in the transferring the ownership and administration of the abbey's mission schools to the Native people they served.

=== Daughter house ===
In 1964, in response to a call made by Pope John XXIII to the Catholic Church in North America to assist their fellow Catholics in Latin America, the abbey established a new foundation, the Priory of the Resurrection, in Cobán, Guatemala. This small community of monks remained a dependency of Blue Cloud Abbey until the abbey's closing, when it was transferred to the authority of St. Meinrad Archabbey.

== Closure ==
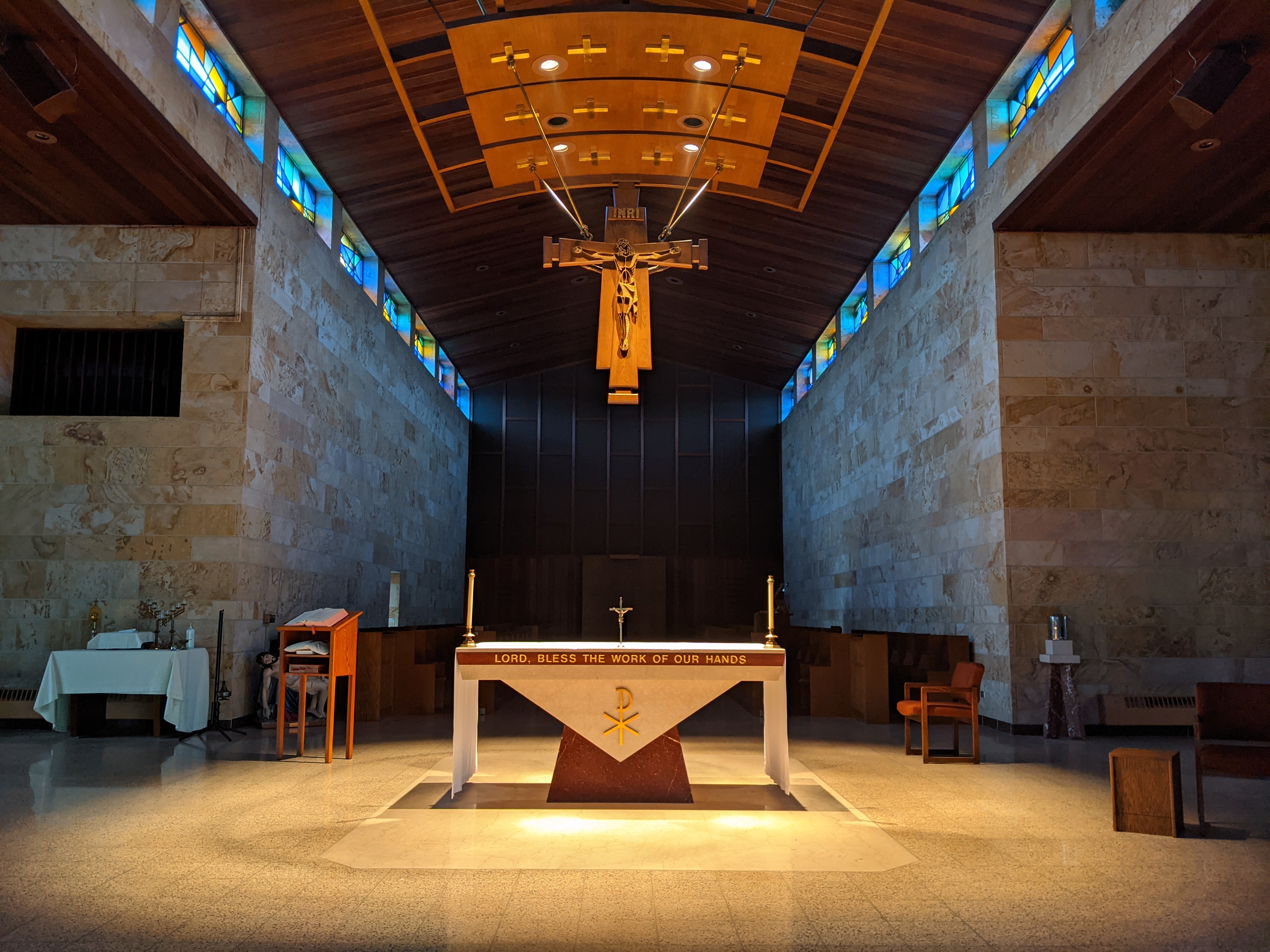
The sanctuary and altar

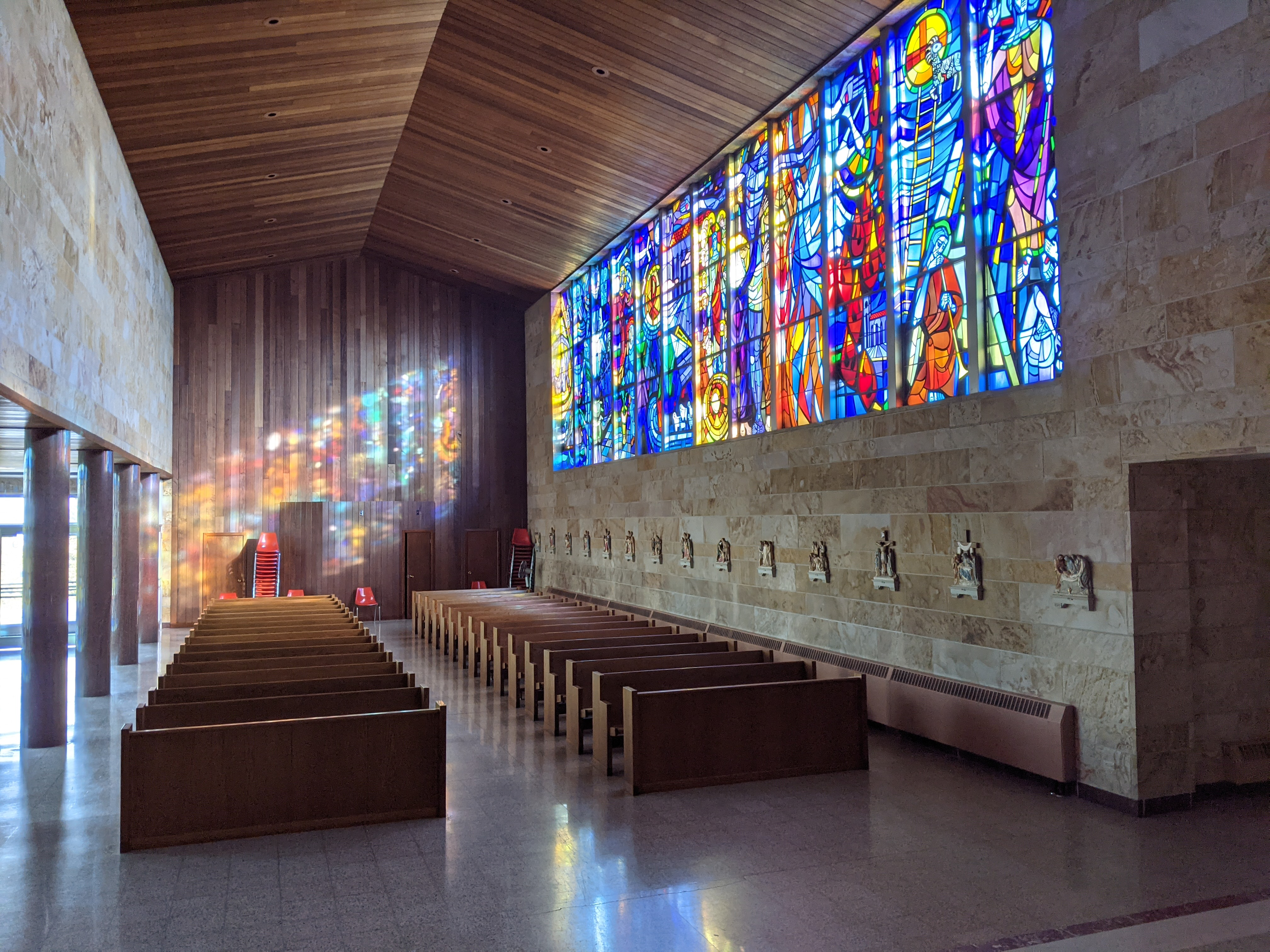
The nave

By 2000, there were only 28 members in finals vows. The final monks to make final vows at Blue Cloud did so in 2004.

On May 29, 2012, the monks of Blue Cloud Abbey voted to close the monastery. The reason for closure was that the monastery had not been able to draw a sufficient number of new members, which led to an increasingly aging monastic community. After a final Mass on Sunday, August 5, 2012—the feast day of Our Lady of the Snows, the patroness of the abbey—it officially ceased operations, and all public liturgies and scheduled retreats were cancelled.

Denis Quinkert, O.S.B., was Blue Cloud Abbey's last abbot. The 14 remaining monks of the community, almost all of whom were above the age of 70, dispersed to other monasteries, including Assumption Abbey in North Dakota and Christ the King Priory in Nebraska.

== Current status ==
While the abbey has not yet been legally dissolved, in December 2013, a Catholic nonprofit organization has taken ownership of the abbey property. It is now operated as the Abbey of the Hills Inn and Retreat Center and includes two hermitages.

== Abbots ==
- Gilbert Hess, O.S.B. (1954–1970)
- Alan Berndt, O.S.B. (1970–1986)
- Denis Quinkert, O.S.B. (1986–1991)
- Thomas Hillebrand, O.S.B. (1992–2009)
- Denis Quinkert, O.S.B.(2009–2012)
