= Bezanson =

Bezanson can refer to:

== Places ==
- Bezanson, Alberta, a hamlet in Alberta, Canada

== People ==
- Jeff Bezanson, an American computer scientist
- Philip Bezanson, an American composer
- Thomas Bezanson, a Canadian artist
