= Saint Meinrad Archabbey =

Benedictine monastery in Ferdinand, Indiana

- Location within Indiana Location within the United States

Monastery information
- Order: Benedictine
- Established: 1854
- Mother house: Einsiedeln Abbey
- Diocese: Archdiocese of Indianapolis

People
- Abbot: Right Reverend Kurt Stasiak, O.S.B.
- Prior: Reverend Bede Sisco, O.S.B.
- Archbishop: Most Rev. Charles C. Thompson

Site
- Coordinates: 38.166212°N 86.810886°W
- Website: https://www.saintmeinrad.org

Saint Meinrad Archabbey is a Catholic monastery in Spencer County, Indiana, US, was founded by monks from Einsiedeln Abbey in Switzerland on March 21, 1854, and is home to approximately 67 monks. The Saint Meinrad Seminary and School of Theology is also located on the premises.

The abbey is named for the monk St. Meinrad of Einsiedeln, who died in 861. It is one of only two archabbeys in the United States and one of 11 in the world. The abbey is located approximately 15 minutes from Monastery Immaculate Conception in Ferdinand, Indiana. Immaculate Conception is for Benedictine women. Because of the presence of the Archabbey, Harrison Township is located within the Archdiocese of Indianapolis instead of the Diocese of Evansville, like the rest of Spencer County.

The Benedictine community at Saint Meinrad consists of men who dedicate their lives to prayer and work. They gather in community five times a day—for morning prayer, Mass, noon prayer, evening prayer and compline—to pray for the Church and the world. Guests often join the monks in prayer in the Archabbey Church.

Gregorian chant is sung in the canonical hours of the monastic Office, primarily in antiphons used to sing the Psalms, in the Great Responsories of Matins, and the Short Responsories of the Lesser Hours and Compline. The psalm antiphons of the Office tend to be short and simple, especially compared to the complex Great Responsories.

In addition, the monks spend private time reading spiritual and religious materials. They live under the Rule of St. Benedict, the 6th-century instructions for community living written by St. Benedict.

== History ==
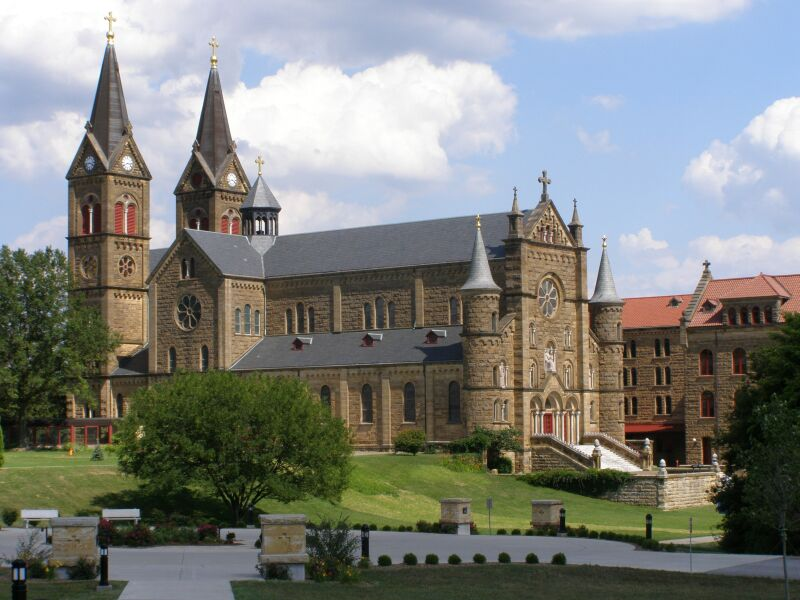
Archabbey Church

The monks came to southern Indiana at the request of a local priest (Reverend Joseph Kundek) for assistance in addressing the pastoral needs of the growing German-speaking Catholic population and to prepare local men to be priests. St. Meinrad was named by the Pope as an abbey in 1870, with Martin Marty as abbot and Fintan Mundwiler as prior.

Shortly after arriving in Indiana, the Benedictines began offering high school courses to local youths. In 1861, the monks expanded their general courses to include undergraduate courses in philosophy and theology. Through these programs, the monks of Saint Meinrad began their mission, which continues today: preparing men for service in the Church as priests. The undergraduate degree program, St. Meinrad College, closed in 1998. It had expanded admission to men who were not seeking the priesthood, and had considered admitting women but found enrollment too low to continue. Saint Meinrad continues to operate a graduate school of theology. It has more than a score of its monks in parish work, chaplaincies, and diocesan assignments.

In 1877, the Abbot of Saint Meinrad Abbey, Martin Marty, negotiated an agreement with an agent of the Little Rock and Fort Smith Railroad Company (LR&FS) Railroad Company, for land in order to establish a Benedictine monastery in northern Arkansas. The railroad controlled thousands of acres of land, and had approached the abbey seeking to gain its support to establish a monastery and school on its holdings. The RR granted 640 acres to the abbey for the monastery and a school. The railroad wanted to attract settlers to this part of their holdings.

Three monk-missionaries from St. Meinrad Abbey founded the new institute on March 15, 1878, in Logan County, Arkansas. Later the monks founded the associated school that continues at the complex. St. Benedict Priory gained independence from St. Meinrad in 1886. In 1891 Pope Leo XIII named it as Subiaco Abbey. It donated 80 acres for a townsite and railroad connection, and the first train served the new town of Subiaco, Arkansas in 1909.

In 1889, a group of monks traveled from St. Meinrad Abbey to the Archdiocese of New Orleans. They were responding to an invitation from the Archbishop to found a college seminary to train local vocations. The monks founded what developed as St. Joseph Abbey, Louisiana, located in Saint Benedict, near Covington, Louisiana, north of New Orleans. Saint Joseph Abbey operates Saint Joseph Seminary College, and a number of other ministries around the Diocese.

In 1933, Saint Meinrad founded Marmion Abbey in Aurora, Illinois. In 1950 Blue Cloud Abbey was founded near Marvin, South Dakota, to serve the local Lakota and related Native American peoples. Due to declining numbers and an aging population, Blue Cloud was closed by its remaining members in 2012. Priests of the Sacred Heart of Jesus also had missions and schools in South Dakota from the early 20th century

In 1958, the monks of Saint Meinrad founded Prince of Peace Abbey in Oceanside, California. Prince of Peace and Marmion abbeys continue to operate.

In 1954 St. Meinrad Abbey was elevated to Archabbey by the Holy See.

== Abbots and Archabbots ==
Abbots

- 1870-1879 Martin Marty
- 1880-1898 Fintan Mundwiler
- 1898-1930 Athanasius Schmitt

Archabbots

- 1930-1955 Ignatius Esser (elevated to Archabbot 1954–1955)
- 1955-1966 Bonaventure Knaebel
- 1966-1978 Gabriel Verkamp
- 1978-1995 Timothy Sweeney
- 1995-2004 Lambert Reilly
- 2004-2016 Justin Duvall
- 2016–Present Kurt Stasiak

== Seminary and School of Theology ==
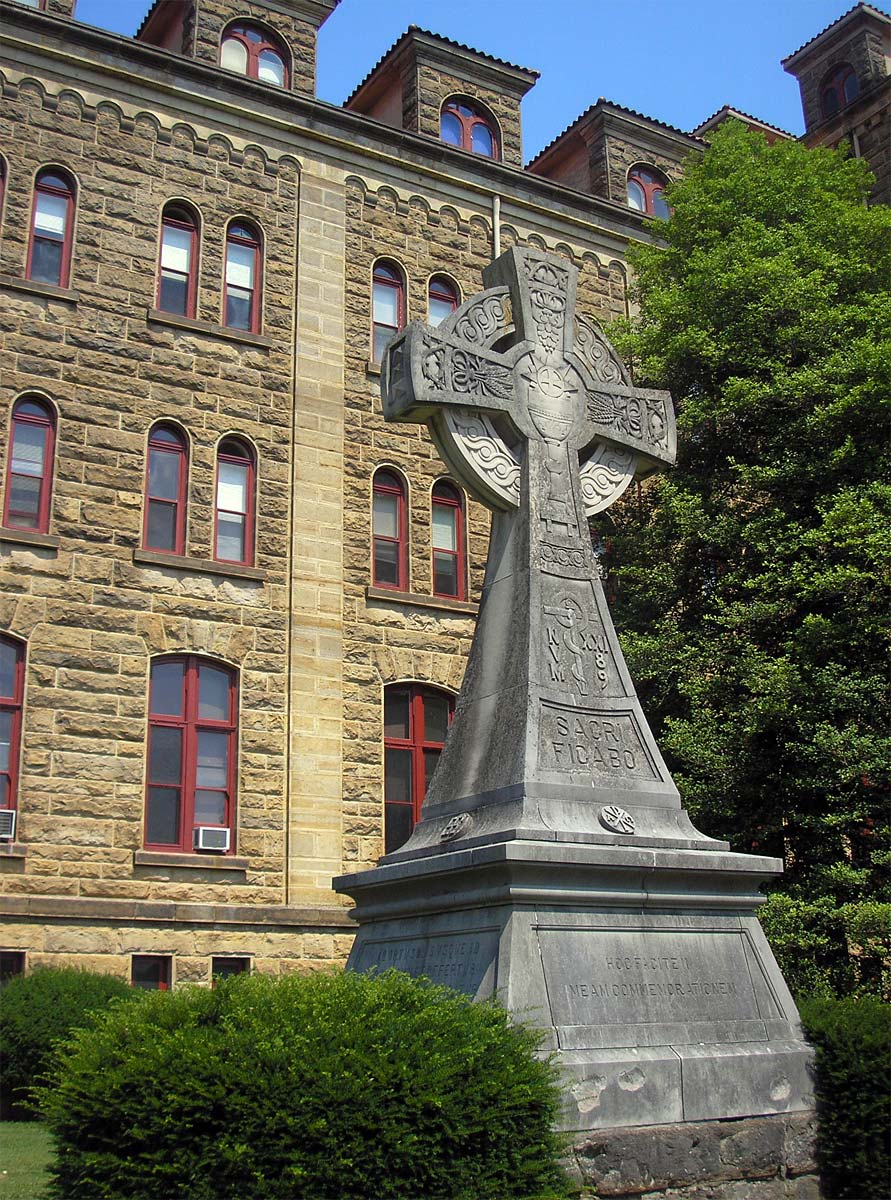
A Celtic cross in front of the School of Theology

The St Meinrad Seminary and School of Theology offers graduate-level degrees in theology. Priesthood candidates work toward a Master of Divinity. Lay degree students can earn a Master of Arts (Theology) or a Master of Arts (Pastoral Theology). A two-year pre-theology program leads to a Master of Catholic Philosophical Studies.

In 1995, there was a controversy over the firing of a theologian, Carmel McEnroy, who taught at the school. In the spring of 1994, Pope John Paul II had issued an Apostolic Letter declaring the issue of the ordination of women as priests resolved and no longer open to debate. Several months after the statement was issued, Dr. McEnroy joined 1,500 others in signing an open letter opposing the Pope's teachings on the subject. After reading the open letter in the National Catholic Reporter, the Archabbot determined that Dr. McEnroy must be removed from the faculty at Saint Meinrad for publicly dissenting from the Pope's teachings. Dr. McEnroy sued on a claim of breach of contract. The lower court dismissed the case, citing lack of jurisdiction, which decision was upheld on appeal.

== Abbey Press ==
Saint Meinrad Archabbey owned and operated an international company that produced and marketed religious, spiritual and inspirational cards, books and gifts. Net proceeds from the sales of Abbey Press products supported the ministries of Saint Meinrad Archabbey. As of June 30, 2017, after 150 years of operation, Abbey Press closed and the printing presses and other equipment were sold. Some 70 people lost their jobs.

== Abbey Caskets ==
Abbey Caskets is a work of Saint Meinrad Archabbey. Founded in 1999, Abbey Caskets offers handcrafted wooden caskets and cremation urns directly to the public. The caskets and cremation urns are made from solid hardwoods, in the choice of poplar, cherry, walnut and oak. The Monastic Abbey Casket is designed after the caskets used by the monks of Saint Meinrad. Abbey Caskets also offers a more conventional casket, the Traditional Abbey Casket. Abbey Woodworking was also created, as a division of Abbey Caskets, that offers custom religious-themed furniture. All proceeds from the sales support Saint Meinrad Archabbey and the Seminary and School of Theology.

== See also ==
- List of churches in the Roman Catholic Archdiocese of Indianapolis
