= Mill Run Playhouse =

- Interactive map of Mill Run Playhouse
- Address: 600 Golf Mill Shopping Center; Niles, Illinois; United States
- Coordinates: 42°03′13″N 87°50′18″W
- Owner: Rach, Comiskey, and Vaughn, Inc.
- Operator: Mill Run Theater Corporation
- Capacity: 1,600
- Type: Theatre in the round

Construction
- Opened: July 2, 1965
- Closed: August 1, 1984
- Demolished: August 1984
- Cost: $750,000
- Architect: Belli & Belli Architects and Engineers

Mill Run Playhouse (a.k.a. Mill Run Theatre) was a 1,600 seat theatre in the round in Niles, Illinois. It was built in 1965 on the grounds of the Golf Mill Shopping Center. It was scheduled to open in June 1965 but torrential rains delayed the opening to July 2, 1965. It was demolished in August 1984. Its last show was a performance by Lou Rawls on August 1.

== History ==
Mill Run was originally a venue for off-Broadway shows. It closed sometime in the late 1960s. In 1969, a group headed by Gerald Kaufman, Sammy Davis Jr., and Donjo Medlevine (a former owner of the Chez Paris), leased the theater from Golf Mill Shopping Center. The plan of the new operators was to bring to the theater Las Vegas entertainers, each act opening on a Tuesday and performing 8 or 9 shows - 1 show each night from Tuesday through Thursday, 1 or 2 shows on Friday, and 2 shows on Saturday and Sunday (some shows were booked for weekend performances only, depending on popularity/availability of performers). Almost every show had an opening act and the 20-minute intermission between acts was utilized by the theater to sell drinks and candy. Long before the theater showed a profit, it was kept solvent by the sale of liquor. First musical contractor was Edwin Shedosky, who was also lead trumpet player for all the orchestras he assembled that the various artists and plays required. 1970 - 1971.

The first act to perform - in early 1970 - was Shecky Greene, who was paid $30,000 for the appearance (tickets went for $7.50). One of the last to perform - in 1984 - was Diana Ross, who was paid $250,000 (tickets now cost $25). In the mid-1970s, management started booking one-night stands on Monday nights, sometimes boxing matches, sometimes headliners. Tom Waits was one of the first to perform on a Monday night. His performance sold out, all records for candy sales were broken, and the theater came close to the single night record for liquor sales. When Kaufman saw the figures. he told Butch Wonders, his manager, to re-book Tom Waits. Butch said that Mr. Waits said he would never work there again as it was the first time he had ever worked in a venue where the patrons "didn't vomit in the aisles." Periodically, the theater would showcase a musical or play, such as Sweet Charity, Hair, Grease, and Jesus Christ Superstar.

Throughout this time, the theater presented shows for children on weekday and weekend mornings. Harry Lee Rogers ran this operation, handling scripts, costumes, music, lighting, casting, and directing single-handedly.

In 1971, Marquee Enterprises was formed to operate Mill Run. It then opened a second venue in San Carlos, California (Circle Star Theater), and subsequently opened other theaters in Los Angeles, Sunrise (Florida), Louisville, Atlanta, and New York. It also ran shows at Radio City Music Hall in New York for 13 weeks a year for several years. It also booked shows for other owners' venues (such as Holiday Star Theater in Merrillville, Indiana).

The theater closed when Golf Mill Shopping Center, the owner of the property, refused to renew the lease in 1984. The site is now part of the parking lot of the shopping center.

=== Cancelled renovation ===
A renovation was scheduled for January 1977 to increase the seating capacity to 2,000 seats and to be closed for six months during renovation. The renovation never went through.

== Notable performers ==
- The 5th Dimension
- Don Adams
- Robert Alda, Lynn Bari, Vivian Blaine, Selma Diamond, Hildegarde, Jane Kean and Mary Small in Follies
- Marty Allen
- Steve Allen
- Woody Allen
- Dana Andrews and Susan Oliver in A Remedy for Winter
- Eddy Arnold
- Average White Band
- Charles Aznavour
- Burt Bacharach
- Jim Bailey
- Pearl Bailey
- Marty Balin
- The Band
- Gene Barry in Fiddler on the Roof
- Count Basie
- Shirley Bassey
- Harry Belafonte
- Tony Bennett
- Jack Benny
- Milton Berle
- Big Twist and the Mellow Fellows
- Bobby Bland
- Joan Blondell in Barefoot in the Park
- Angela Bofill
- Victor Borge
- David Brenner
- Foster Brooks
- James Brown
- Red Buttons
- John Byner
- Glen Campbell
- Canned Heat
- Captain & Tennille
- George Carlin
- The Carpenters
- Vikki Carr
- Jack Carter
- Johnny Cash
- Harry Chapin
- Cyd Charisse
- Ray Charles
- Charo
- Chubby Checker
- Cheech & Chong
- Fred Clark and Virginia Graham in The Crocodile and the Cockeyed Moose
- Roy Clark
- Rosemary Clooney
- Myron Cohen
- Natalie Cole
- Dorothy Collins in The Sound of Music
- Perry Como
- Pat Cooper
- Bill Cosby
- Jim Croce
- Kathryn Crosby in Sabrina Fair
- Norm Crosby
- The Crusaders
- The Cryan' Shames
- Steve Dahl & Garry Meier
- Vic Damone
- Rodney Dangerfield
- Billy Daniels
- James Darren, Reginald Gardiner, Gigi Perreau and Pippa Scott in Tom Jones
- John Davidson
- Bette Davis
- Miles Davis
- Sammy Davis Jr.
- The Spencer Davis Group
- Marlene Dietrich
- Phyllis Diller
- Tony Dow in Here Today
- Tom Dreesen
- Ronnie Dyson
- Billy Eckstine
- Cass Elliot
- England Dan & John Ford Coley
- Barbara Fairchild
- Lola Falana
- José Feliciano
- Freddy Fender
- Totie Fields
- Ella Fitzgerald
- Roberta Flack
- John Forsythe in Oh, Men! Oh, Women!
- Redd Foxx
- Sergio Franchi
- Connie Francis
- James Franciscus in Anatomy of a Murder
- Janie Fricke
- Zsa Zsa Gabor in Blithe Spirit
- John Gary
- Larry Gatlin
- Mitzi Gaynor
- Mickey Gilley
- George Gobel
- Frank Gorshin
- Robert Goulet
- Betty Grable in Born Yesterday
- Al Green
- Shecky Greene
- Joel Grey
- Buddy Hackett
- Rich Hall
- Stanley Myron Handelman
- Emmylou Harris
- Donny Hathaway
- Isaac Hayes
- Heartsfield
- Joey Heatherton
- Heatwave
- Florence Henderson
- Pat Henry
- Charlton Heston in A Man for All Seasons
- Mimi Hines
- Don Ho
- Bob Hope
- Lena Horne
- Thelma Houston
- H.P. Lovecraft
- Engelbert Humperdinck
- Tab Hunter and Ann Sothern in Barefoot in the Park
- Iron Butterfly
- The Isley Brothers
- The Jacksons
- Jan and Dean
- Al Jarreau
- Dick Jensen
- Van Johnson in A Thousand Clowns
- Quincy Jones
- Tom Jones
- Gabe Kaplan
- John Kay & Steppenwolf
- Lainie Kazan
- KC and the Sunshine Band
- Sally Kellerman
- Chaka Khan
- The King Sisters
- Alan King
- B.B. King
- Gladys Knight & the Pips
- Kool & the Gang
- Cleo Laine
- Frankie Laine
- Dorothy Lamour and Scott McKay in Once More, With Feeling
- Carol Lawrence
- Steve Lawrence & Eydie Gormé
- Peggy Lee
- The Lettermen
- Jerry Lewis
- Jerry Lee Lewis
- Liberace
- Gordon Lightfoot
- The Limeliters
- Rich Little
- Little River Band
- Paul Lynde
- Gordon MacRae in Carousel
- The Mamas & the Papas
- Melissa Manchester
- The Manhattan Transfer
- Peter Marshall
- Martha and the Vandellas
- Dean Martin
- Tony Martin
- Al Martino
- Johnny Mathis
- Les McCann
- Barbara McNair
- Sérgio Mendes
- Robert Merrill
- Marilyn Michaels
- Ray Milland in Angel Street
- The Mills Brothers
- Stephanie Mills
- Liza Minnelli
- Melba Moore
- Rita Moreno
- Patricia Morison in The King and I
- Nana Mouskouri
- Anne Murray
- Jan Murray
- Jim Nabors
- The New Seekers
- Bob Newhart
- Anthony Newley
- Wayne Newton
- Nitty Gritty Dirt Band
- The O'Jays
- The Oak Ridge Boys
- Helen O'Connell
- Tony Orlando
- The Osmonds
- Donny and Marie Osmond
- Jack Palance in Heaven Can Wait
- Dolly Parton
- Tom Paxton
- Freda Payne
- Teddy Pendergrass
- The Persuasions
- Oscar Peterson
- Molly Picon in A Majority of One
- Jean-Luc Ponty
- Louis Prima
- Freddie Prinze
- Juliet Prowse in Sweet Charity
- Eddie Rabbitt
- Bonnie Raitt
- Lou Rawls
- Martha Raye in Goodbye Charlie
- Helen Reddy
- Tim Reid
- Debbie Reynolds
- Don Rickles
- Minnie Riperton
- Joan Rivers
- Marty Robbins
- Smokey Robinson
- Cesar Romero in Strictly Dishonorable
- Rose Marie
- Diana Ross
- Jane Russell in Here Today and Mame
- Mitch Ryder & The Detroit Wheels
- Sandler and Young
- John Schneider
- Neil Sedaka
- Shalamar
- Sha Na Na
- Frank Sinatra
- Jimmy Smith
- Kate Smith
- Smothers Brothers
- Suzanne Somers
- Sonny & Cher
- The Spinners
- Rick Springfield
- The Staple Singers
- Connie Stevens
- Donna Summer
- The Supremes
- Koko Taylor
- The Temptations
- Danny Thomas
- Mel Tillis
- Lily Tomlin
- Mel Tormé
- Tower of Power
- Lana Turner in Forty Carats
- Ike & Tina Turner
- Tina Turner solo
- Conway Twitty
- Leslie Uggams
- Up with People
- Jerry Vale
- Dana Valery
- Frankie Valli
- Luther Vandross
- Sarah Vaughan
- Ben Vereen
- Bobby Vinton
- Tom Waits
- Dionne Warwick
- Muddy Waters
- The Whispers
- Slappy White
- Margaret Whiting
- Andy Williams
- Hank Williams Jr.
- Joe Williams
- Paul Williams
- Nancy Wilson
- Steven Wright
- Tammy Wynette
- Pia Zadora
