= Marillac College =

Catholic college in St. Louis, Missouri, US (1955–1974)

Coordinates: 38.701860°N 90.307218°W

Marillac College was a Catholic sisters' college that operated from 1955 to 1974 in St. Louis, Missouri.

It was founded by the Daughters of Charity of Saint Vincent de Paul, who named it for the order's co-founder, Saint Louise de Marillac. Like other sisters' colleges, it was dedicated to the education of women religious, though it was also open to the laity. Unlike some sisters' colleges, it had a full four-year Bachelor's-granting program.

First accredited in 1960, Marillac offered instruction in theological and philosophical fields as well as in secular subjects, including nursing, mathematics, optometry, English, and American studies.

The major buildings were designed by Chicago architect Edo Belli, whose firm conducted a longstanding collaboration with the Daughters of Charity in several states.

The Marillac campus was acquired by the University of Missouri–St. Louis by 1976.

== See also ==
- List of current and historical women's universities and colleges
