= Golf Mill Shopping Center =

Shopping center in Cook County, Illinois, U.S.

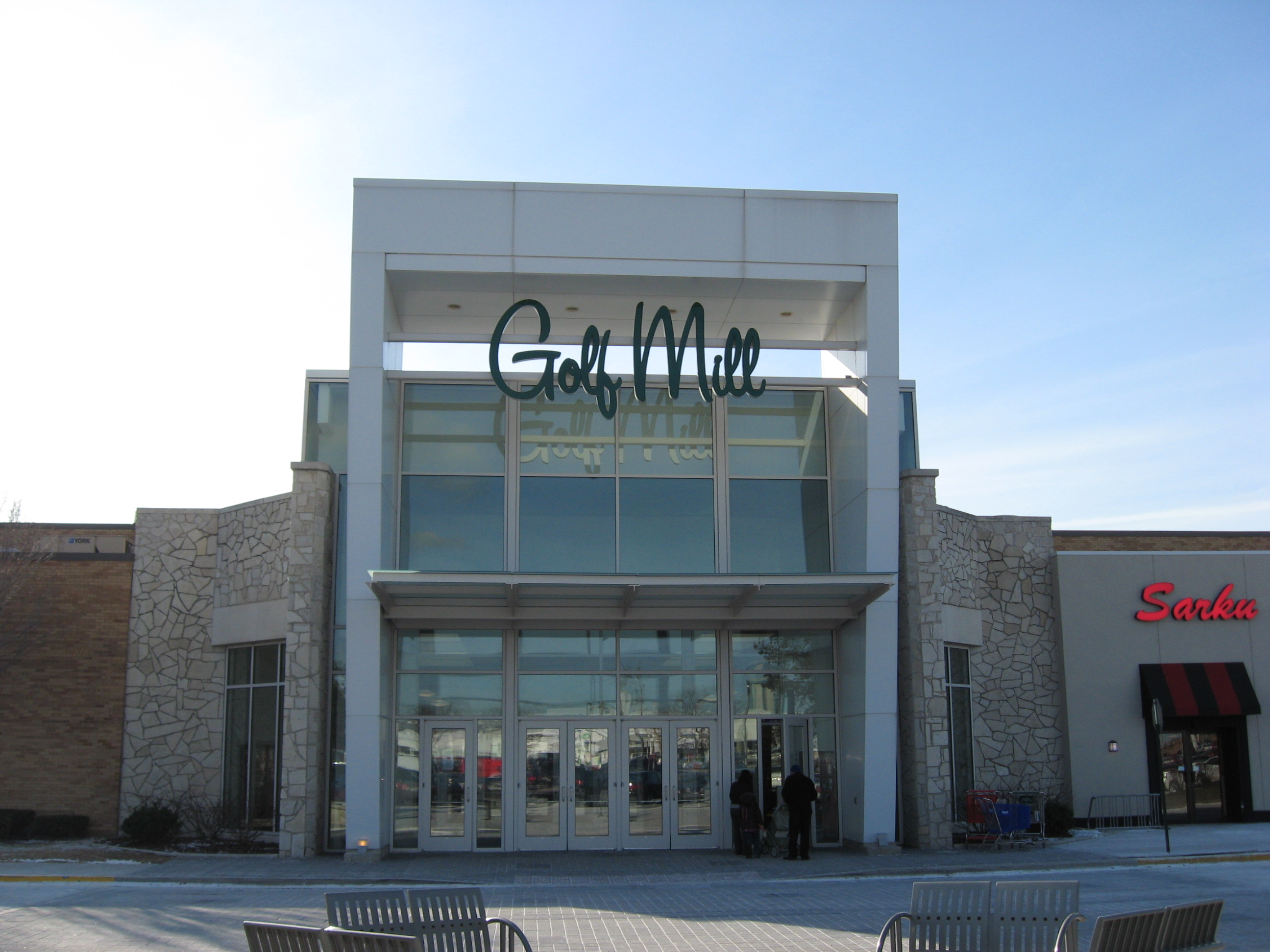
- Golf Mill Center entrance in 2010
- Location: Niles, Illinois, United States
- Coordinates: 42°3′0″N 87°50′14″W
- Address: 239 Golf Mill Center
- Opened: October 13, 1960; 66 years ago
- Manager: Sterling Retail Services
- Num. of stores: 120 (at peak)
- Num. of anchor tenants: 7 (6 open, 1 vacant)
- Floor area: 1,057,000 square feet (98,200 m^{2})
- Floors: 1 (2 in JCPenney, and former Sears)
- Parking: 5,500
- Public transit: Pace
- Website: golfmill.com

Golf Mill Shopping Center, or simply Golf Mill is a shopping center located at 239 Golf Mill Center in Niles, Illinois. The shopping mall has a gross leasable area of 1.1 million square feet (100,000 m^{2}). It is managed by Sterling Retail Services. It borders the intersections of Golf Road (Illinois Route 58), Milwaukee Avenue (Illinois Route 21) and Greenwood Avenue. The shopping mall has over 100 specialty shops, three anchor stores (JCPenney, Target, and Ross Dress for Less), an AMC Theatres, a grocery store (Gordon Food Service), a LA Fitness (formerly XSport Fitness), and a 9-story office tower and other outparcels. Former anchors included Sears and Roebuck (closed December 2018), Kohl's (closed Halloween 2020), and Value City Furniture.

== History ==
Golf Mill opened to the public in October 1960 as an open-air mall and featured an office tower (designed by Chicago architect Edo Belli to look like the top of a golf ball) and Sears. It featured a full "mill" theme, complete with ponds, bridges, and a working waterwheel. Soon after opening, a Lord's department store was built, but closed after a few years and was replaced by JCPenney. Around that time, the Mill Run Playhouse was built at the north end of the complex that wasn't connected to the corridors.

General Growth Properties took over the management of the Golf Mill Shopping Center in 1994.

After General Growth Properties went bankrupt, Milwaukee Golf Management Corporation took over the management of the Golf Mill Shopping Center in 2009. Sterling Organization purchased Golf Mill Shopping Center in August 2014 via a private equity fund, and its subsidiary, Sterling Retail Services is currently managing the property on behalf of the fund.

== Renovations ==
In 1986, the mall underwent major renovations, with the north end being completely rebuilt as an enclosed portion anchored by MainStreet and enclosing the mall between the Sears and JCPenney, also adding a food court in the process.

In 2006, GGP remodeled the mall complete with new flooring and a new food court entrance, however the north wing and a corridor in the south wing were left untouched. The remodel also added a 12-screen Kerasotes movie theater.

When Ulta first opened in 2017, mall management planned to relocate the former south food court next to AMC, but later scrapped those plans.

In January 2022, the management announced that it would redevelop most of the mall, planning to demolish the former Sears, AMC, iconic circular tower, and various outlots as part of a "live work play" styled development. The new development would bring back the water wheel, add new outdoor retail, apartment complexes, new greenspace. JCPenney, Ulta Beauty, Chick-fil-A, Panera, Chase, X-Sport Fitness, Burlington, Target, and other stores will remain.

== Bus routes ==
Pace

- 100 Pulse Milwaukee Line
- 208 Golf Road
- 240 Dee Road
- 241 Greenwood/Talcott
- 270 Milwaukee Avenue
- 272 Milwaukee Avenue North
- 410 East Niles Local
- 411 West Niles Local
- 412 North Niles Circulator
