= Westminster Abbey (British Columbia) =

Community of Benedictine monks in British Columbia, Canada

Coordinates: 49.15360°N 122.27100°W

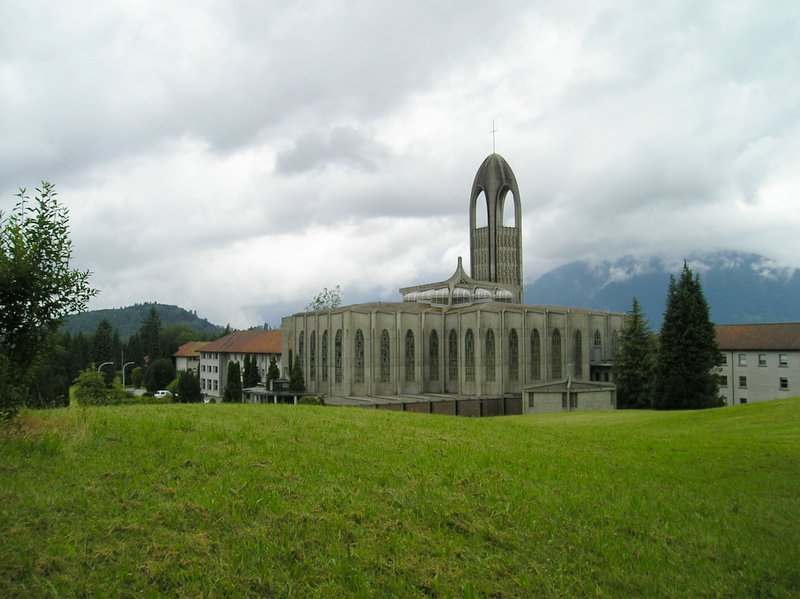
- Church of Westminster Abbey
- Interactive map of Westminster Abbey

Monastery information
- Established: 1939; 87 years ago

Westminster Abbey is a community of Benedictine monks in Mission, British Columbia, established in 1939 from the Abbey of Mount Angel, Oregon. The abbey is home to the Seminary of Christ the King and is a member of the Swiss American Congregation within the Benedictine Confederation.

The abbey's official name is the Abbey of Saint Joseph of Westminster; Saint Joseph is the abbey's patron saint. The abbey was designed by the firm of Gardiner, Thornton, Gathe and Associates.

== History ==
The seminary was founded in 1931 by Archbishop William Mark Duke of the Archdiocese of Vancouver. Five monks, including Father Eugene Medved, later Prior and Abbot, were sent from Mount Angel Abbey, Oregon, to British Columbia in 1939 to found a priory and to take over the running of the Seminary of Christ the King, which was then located in Ladner, B.C. The following year, the monks moved their new priory together with the seminary to Burnaby, near Vancouver, B.C., neighbouring New Westminster. It became a conventual (independent) priory in 1948.

The Holy See raised the priory to the status of an Abbey, and Prior Eugene was elected as the first Abbot of the new abbey in 1953. In the same year, construction began on a new abbey, church, and seminary, designed by the Norwegian architect, Asbjørn Gåthe. The new location was on the outskirts of the town of Mission. The monks began to live on this site beginning in 1954; buildings were gradually added, culminating in the abbey church in 1982. The abbey is located on a hill northeast of the town centre, with a view up the Fraser River valley.

Father Maurus Macrae was elected abbot in 1992 after the death of Abbot Eugene. He continued as abbot until his death in 2005, when Father John Braganza was elected. After having served the monastic community for over 17 years, Father Abbot John Braganza OSB resigned on May 3, 2022. (Note: In a statement from the Abbey, it said, “At this time, however, it has become evident that there is need for change and renewal, for both Abbot John and for the community...concerns have arisen regarding his interpersonal relations,” but that there are no allegations of sexual misconduct or of any misconduct with minors.) On July 11, 2022, the bells of Westminster Abbey rang once again for her newly elected abbot—Father Abbot Alban Riley OSB. He was solemnly blessed by the Archbishop of Vancouver J. Michael Miller on September 14, 2022, in the Abbey Church.

== Activities ==
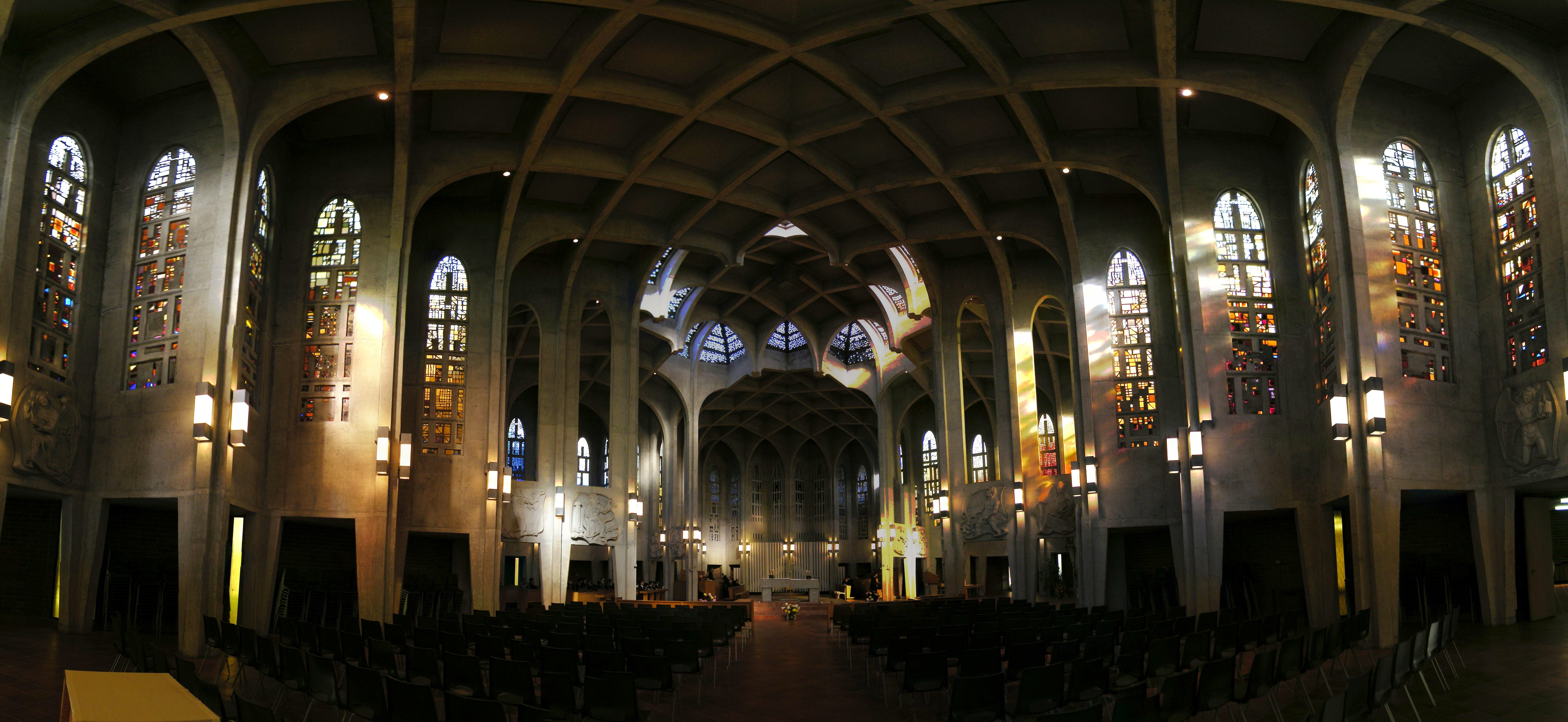
Panoramic image of the interior of the church.

Benedictine monks live by the motto of their order, Ora et Labora ("Pray and Work"). The roughly 30 monks at Westminster Abbey also follow this.

In 1950, Benedictine sisters came to help the abbey, and continued there until they left in 1968. Since then, all kitchen, farm, and most other work at the abbey has been done by the monks themselves.

=== Prayer ===
The monks pray the Liturgy of the Hours, namely Lauds, Midday Prayer, Vespers and Vigils at four different times throughout the day. These are usually sung publicly in the Abbey church.

=== Seminary ===
The monks operate the Seminary of Christ the King, with a minor (high school) and major (college) seminary, both for young men. The students reside on the grounds during the school year. They also participate in the singing of the Liturgy of the Hours. The minor seminary is the only Anglophone high school seminary in Canada, and also the only minor seminary run by Benedictine Monks in the world. The major seminary is a private institution authorised by the government of British Columbia to grant degrees. In 1951 the Seminary opened the Faculty of Theology. In 1966, through its own University Charter, the Seminary was empowered to grant the Bachelor of Arts degree as well as degrees in Theology.

The students are taught by the monks, as well by many volunteer teachers. The Major seminarians are also taught by local diocesan priests.

In 1973-74 a large athletic field was constructed with the aid of a Canadian Forces field unit; in 1977 the gymnasium-auditorium was completed.

=== Art ===
Father Dunstan Massey was the abbey's resident artist. He has painted several frescoes around the abbey, and he has also created a series of concrete bas-reliefs affixed to pillars inside the church.

=== Farm ===
The abbey's farm is worked by the monks. It houses up to 40 cattle, raised for their meat. There are also chickens, whose eggs and meat are eaten. Most of the meat eaten at the abbey comes from the farm.

The abbey, including the farm and woods, covers over 70 hectares of land.

== Gallery ==
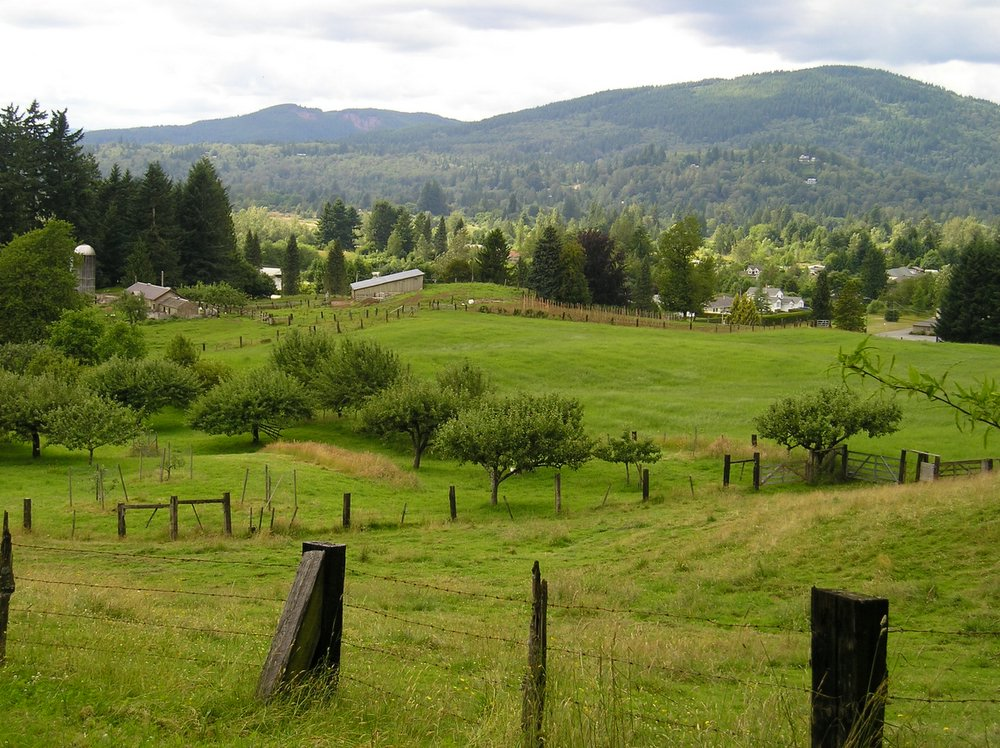
Abbey farm

Detail of incomplete fresco, The Celestial Banquet, painted by Fr. Dunstan Massey

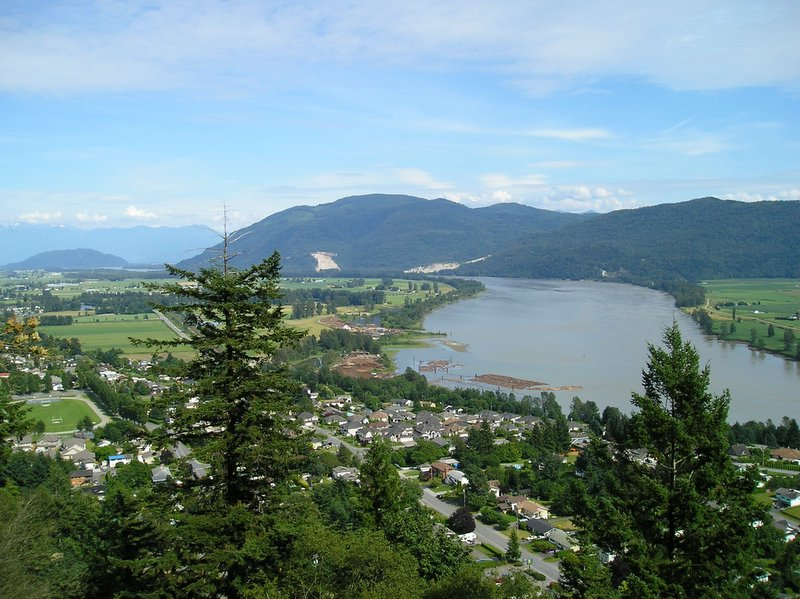
View of the Fraser River, seen from the abbey
