= Mount Michael Benedictine School =

Location
- 22520 Mount Michael Road; Elkhorn, Nebraska; United States; 41°19′0″N 96°16′8″W

Information
- Type: Private, all-male; residential and day
- Motto: "Ut in omnibus glorificetur Deus" ("That in all things God may be glorified.")
- Religious affiliation: Roman Catholic
- Head of school: Dr. David Peters
- Grades: 9–12
- Colors: Red, black and white
- Team name: Knights
- Accreditation: AdvancED
- Website: www.mountmichael.com

Mount Michael Benedictine School is a Catholic all boys high school just north of Elkhorn in the state of Nebraska, within the Roman Catholic Archdiocese of Omaha.

== History ==
The school, originally St. John Vianney Seminary, was founded in 1953 by Immaculate Conception Abbey in Missouri as a high school and junior college for men preparing for the priesthood. The seminary was run by monks of Mount Michael Abbey. In the spring of 1970, the monks converted the seminary to a typical high school changing the name to Mount Michael Benedictine School, a Catholic residential high school encompassing grades 9 through 12 with a focus on college-prep curriculum.

Mount Michael began as a five-day boarding school for students in Omaha and surrounding areas. During the 2002–2003 school year, Mount Michael introduced its day program for students who wished to commute to and from school each day, and the seven-day boarding program for international and out-of-state students.

== Sports/extracurricular activities ==
Mount Michael competes in Class B Rivers Cities Conference for all sports. Sports and extracurricular activities offered at Mount Michael include cross country, tennis, football, wrestling, swimming, basketball, bowling, golf, trapshooting, soccer, baseball, track & field, American Legion baseball, robotics, Academic Decathlon, speech, band, choir, drama, journalism, Rainbow Coalition, mock trial, student government, Investment Club, and National Honor Society.

From 1970 through 2015, Mount Michael won 31 state championships in a variety of sports and activities.

== Transportation ==
Mount Michael's only direct connection to the rest of the road system is by using the namesake Mt. Michael Road. Located north of Elkhorn and additionally close to the village of Waterloo, Nebraska, the school's primary road connections by highway are Nebraska Highway 64 and U.S. Route 275.
