= Dunstan Massey =

Canadian Benedictine sculptor and painter (1924–2022)

Father Dunstan Massey OSB
- Born: William Massey; April 16, 1924; Vancouver, British Columbia, Canada
- Died: December 26, 2022 (aged 98); Mission, British Columbia, Canada
- Citizenship: Canadian
- Education: Vancouver School of Art
- Occupations: Benedictine monk, artist
- Notable work: The Heavenly Banquet; The Temptation of St. Benedict; The Tree of Life

Dunstan Massey, OSB (born William Massey; 1924–2022) was a Canadian Benedictine monk, sculptor, and painter who spent decades of his monastic life creating sacred art for Westminster Abbey in Mission, British Columbia. Born in Vancouver on April 16, 1924, he studied at the Vancouver School of Art. In 1940, at age 16, he became the youngest artist ever to hold a solo exhibition at the Vancouver Art Gallery.

Massey gave up being a professional artist to accept a monastic vocation at Westminster Abbey in Mission in 1942, at age 18. He adopted the name Dunstan after St. Dunstan of Canterbury, patron saint of artists and goldsmiths. He created most of his artwork for the abbey's own use, living almost entirely unknown outside the Fraser Valley for most of his life. Among his frescoes are The Heavenly Banquet, The Temptation of St. Benedict, and The Tree of Life. He also produced a series of concrete relief panels for the interior of the abbey church.

Father Massey died on December 26, 2022, at age 98.

== Selected writings ==
- Massey, Dunstan. The Mystic Mountain: A Poetic Scenario for the Resurrection. Carlisle, UK: Piquant, 2002. ISBN 1903689023.
- Massey, Dunstan. The Mystic Mountain: A Poetic Scenario for the Resurrection (With Other Poems). Eugene, Oregon: Resource Publications, 2017. ISBN 9781532642364.
- Massey, Dunstan. The Stone Ship: A Nocturne in Three Watches. Eugene, Oregon: Resource Publications, 2014. ISBN 9781625641014.
- Massey, Dunstan. "The Temptation of St. Benedict". Westminster Abbey, 2018. Accessed September 4, 2026.
