= Weston Priory =

Benedictine monastery in Weston, Vermont

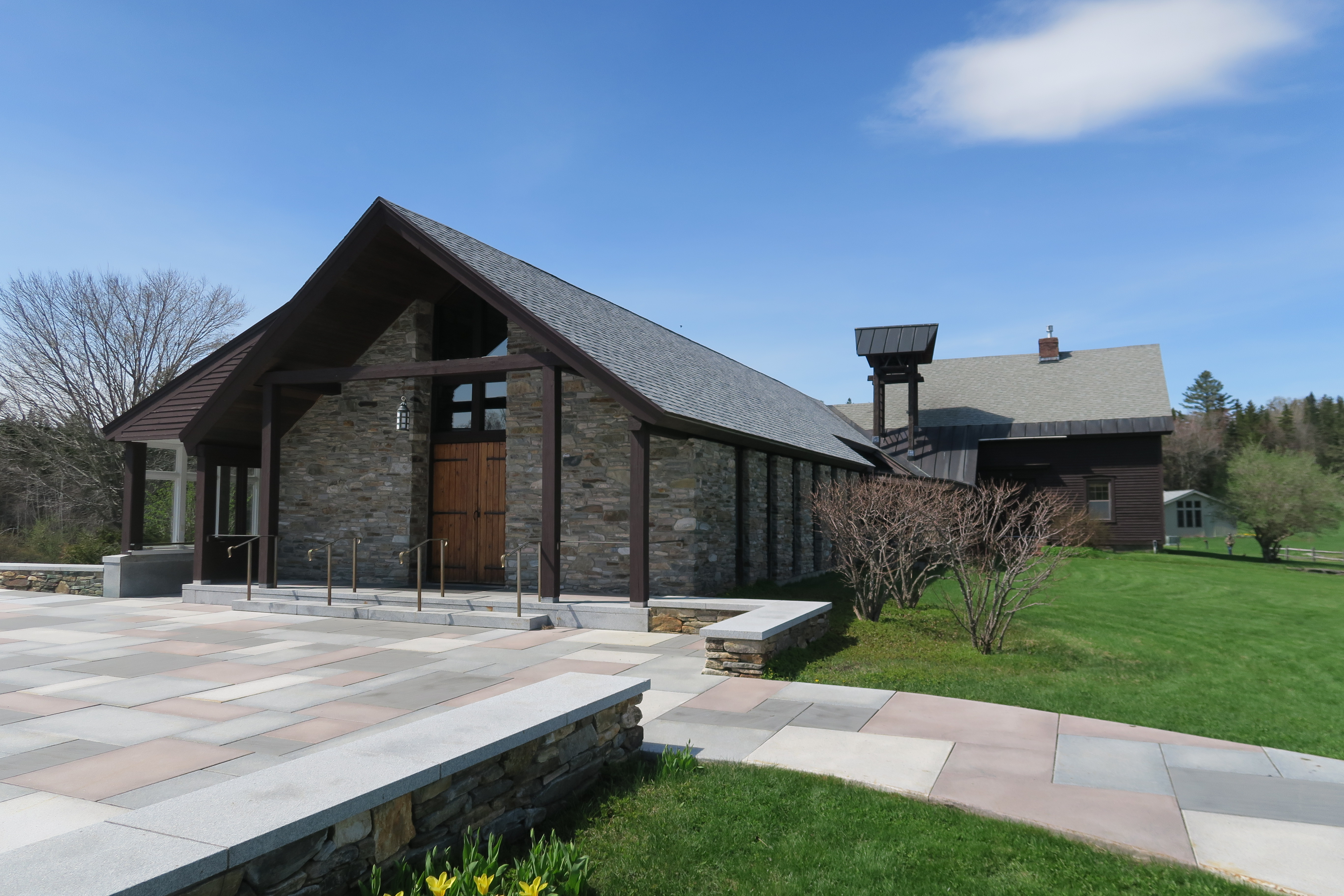
- Chapel

- Location within Vermont Location within the United States

Monastery information
- Order: Benedictine

People
- Founder: Leo A. Rudloff

Architecture
- Groundbreaking: 1952

Site
- Coordinates: 43°20′15.4″N 72°47′32.0″W

Weston Priory is a community of Benedictine monks who reside in Weston, Vermont and currently belongs to the Swiss-American Congregation. Founded in 1953, The Priory is situated within the confines of the Roman Catholic Diocese of Burlington, which encompasses the entirety of Vermont. They are particularly known for the songs they have contributed to Roman Catholic worship over the past 50 years, their connection to Latin America, and the crafts produced at the monastery.

== History and mission ==
Weston Priory was founded by Abbot Leo A. Rudloff of Dormition Abbey in Jerusalem in 1953. He had the intention that some of those trained in Vermont would later assist the community at Dormition Abbey in Jerusalem. Abbot Leo also expressed the hope that the priory would become a community in its own right in the movement of monastic renewal. Today, the community is an independent or conventual priory. At the beginning, Abbot Leo considered locating the priory in Pennsylvania or a few other places, but the presence of other religious houses in those places required that he look elsewhere. With the help of Benedictine oblates Leon and Dorothea Smith, he located a suitable site in the Green Mountains of Vermont.

The original building was an old abandoned farmhouse with an attached barn, a few miles from the village of Weston. The attached barn had been partially burned and was renovated to become the chapel. Abbot Leo engaged a Weston group to renovate the barn-chapel. A dilapidated chicken house behind the main house was renovated to become classroom, recreation room and dormitory for novices.

In a small book titled The Silent Life, published in 1957 Thomas Merton refers to Weston Priory as a new Benedictine foundation of "the Primitive Observance". The priory was in fact one of several North American monasteries in the renewal movement that preceded Vatican Council II. Thomas Merton considered Weston to be one of only a handful that was dedicated to Benedictine renewal, including the rediscovery of "choir monks," educated monks who prayed the full Liturgy of the Hours, yet not being priests.

The Weston community became increasingly dedicated to the peace and social justice movements. The abbey bonded with a group of Benedictine nuns in Mexico, establishing a retreat center in Cuernavaca to raise consciousness among North Americans of their southern neighbors. Through the monastery's relationships with senators Patrick Leahy and Bernie Sanders, they have tried to bring more attention to the plight of the poor in Mexico. The priory was, in the 1980s, one of several hundred churches and religious organizations that pledged to provide for refugees seeking homes in the United States.

In June 2026 the Weston community was incorporated into the Swiss-American Congregation.

=== Music and artwork ===
In the 1960s, the brothers of Weston Priory began writing their own music for liturgical use. Their music has become well known throughout the world.

The monks maintain gardens, livestock, and a book store with items produced by the brothers. Several pieces of the pottery produced at the monastery are held by museums, such as the Museum of Fine Arts in Boston.

== Notable members ==
Abbot Leo Rudloff, at that time Abbot of Dormition Abbey, was named to the pre-Vatican Council Commission that included the quest for reconciliation between Christians and Jews. When he retired as abbot in Jerusalem, the abbot journeyed to his foundation in Weston and was known as Brother Leo. Other well-known community members have included ceramic artist Brother Thomas (Thomas Bezanson) and Gregory Norbet, the composer of much of the community's earlier music. Author Tomie dePaola was briefly a member in 1956.

== Awards ==
In July 1992, the Weston Priory Community was awarded the Peace Abbey Courage of Conscience Award in Sherborn, Massachusetts, for its reception of the Guatemalan Refugee family, Elena and Felipe Ixcot and their five children.

== See also ==
- Contemporary Catholic liturgical music
