= Mount Michael Abbey =

Roman Catholic monastery in Nebraska, United States

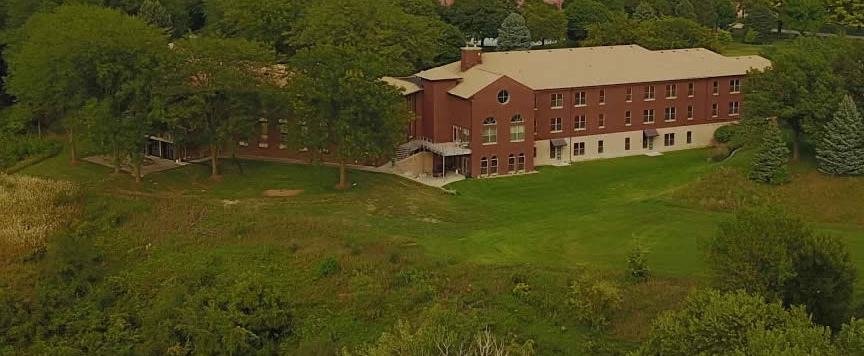
- Mount Michael Abbey building

- Location within Nebraska Location within the United States
- Interactive map of Mount Michael Abbey

Monastery information
- Order: Order of St. Benedict
- Established: 1953
- Mother house: Conception Abbey
- Dedication: St. Michael the Archangel
- Diocese: Archdiocese of Omaha

People
- Abbot: Abbot Michael Liebl OSB
- Prior: Fr. Louis Sojka OSB

Architecture
- Functional status: Abbey

Site
- Location: Elkhorn, Nebraska
- Coordinates: 41°19′0″N 96°16′8″W
- Website: mountmichael.org

Mount Michael Abbey is a Benedictine monastery outside Elkhorn, Nebraska. It is located in the Archdiocese of Omaha. The Abbey sits within 400 acre grounds just northwest of the city. The majority of which is a mixture of cropland, pasture, and woodlands. Also on the property are the buildings of the high school (which was founded by the Abbey), multiple guest houses, barns for the farm equipment, and outdoor shrines for monks and visitors to reflect and pray. The abbey is part of the Swiss-American Congregation and traces its roots to Engelberg Abbey in Switzerland and Immaculate Conception Abbey in Missouri.

== Origins ==
In 1942 Conception Abbey and Seminary, located in Missouri, was expanded to a 12-year institution, including a preparatory high school, a junior college, a senior college, and a school of theology. By 1950 increased enrollment and a change in focus led to the transfer of the high school division to a new Benedictine monastery. Abbot Stephen Schappler began to look for a place to which he could move the minor seminary.

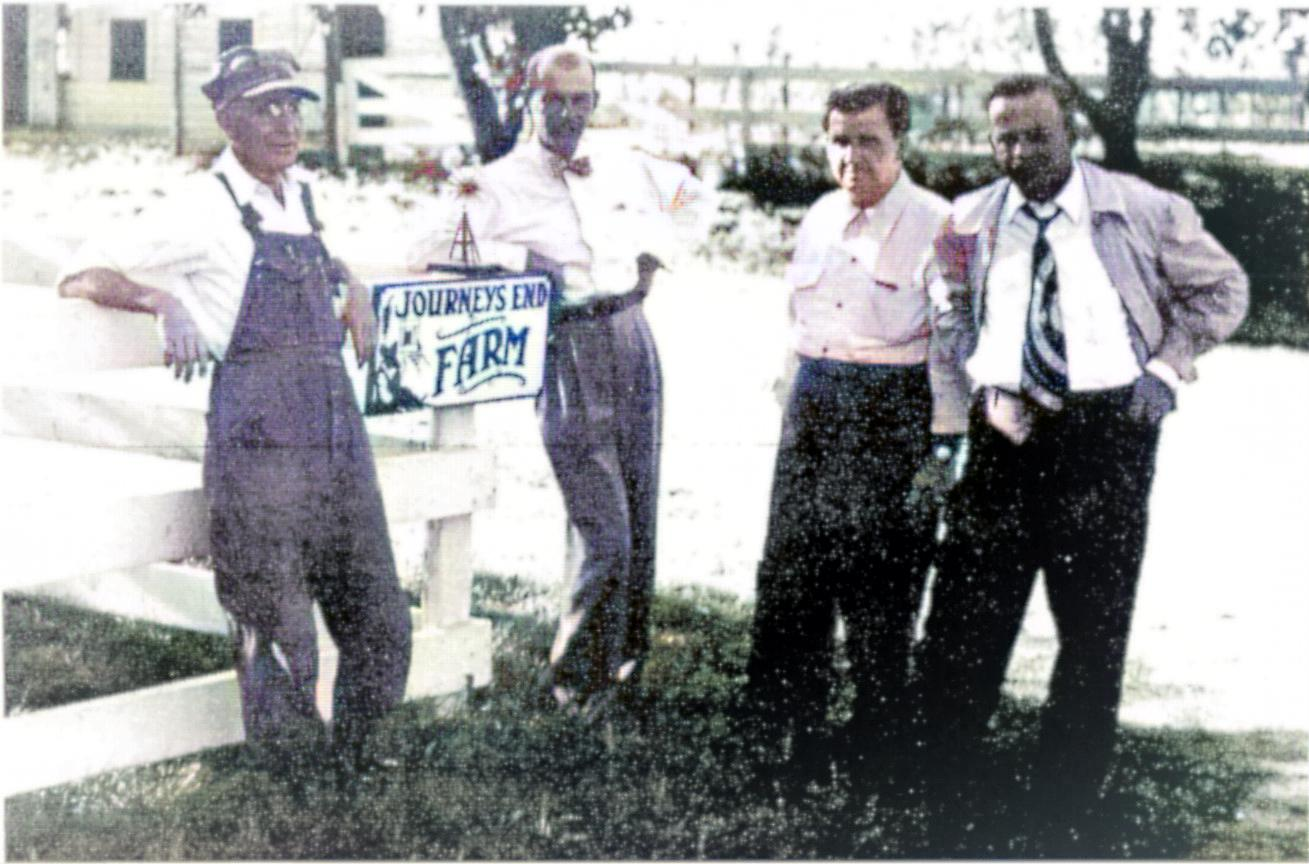
Rex Olsen at Journey's End farm. From left are Mr. Rex Olsen, a NE State Senator, Mr. Charles Tvrdik, and another NE State Senator.

In 1952 he found a host in Omaha, Archbishop Gerald T. Bergan. Abbot Stephen sent Fathers Edward Malone, Lawrence Gidley, and Daniel Schuster to Omaha NE to find a property for the new foundation. They came up short but Oblate Director Fr. Dominic Lavin began his own search. Fr. Dominic’s persistence brought him into contact with Mr. Rex Olsen, a retired journeyman who owned a Journey's End farm on the eastern edge of the Elkhorn Valley. Fr. Lavin visited Journey's End and found it to be ideal for the new foundation. After viewing the farm Fr. Lavin met with Olsen and told him that he found the site quite suitable. Olsen was initially hesitant to give up the farm but after some consultation from the bishop of Grand Island, Olsen generously donated his farm, all his equipment, and livestock. The monks accepted the property on September 29, 1952, the feast of St. Michael, and the first monks were sent to Omaha on May 14, 1953.

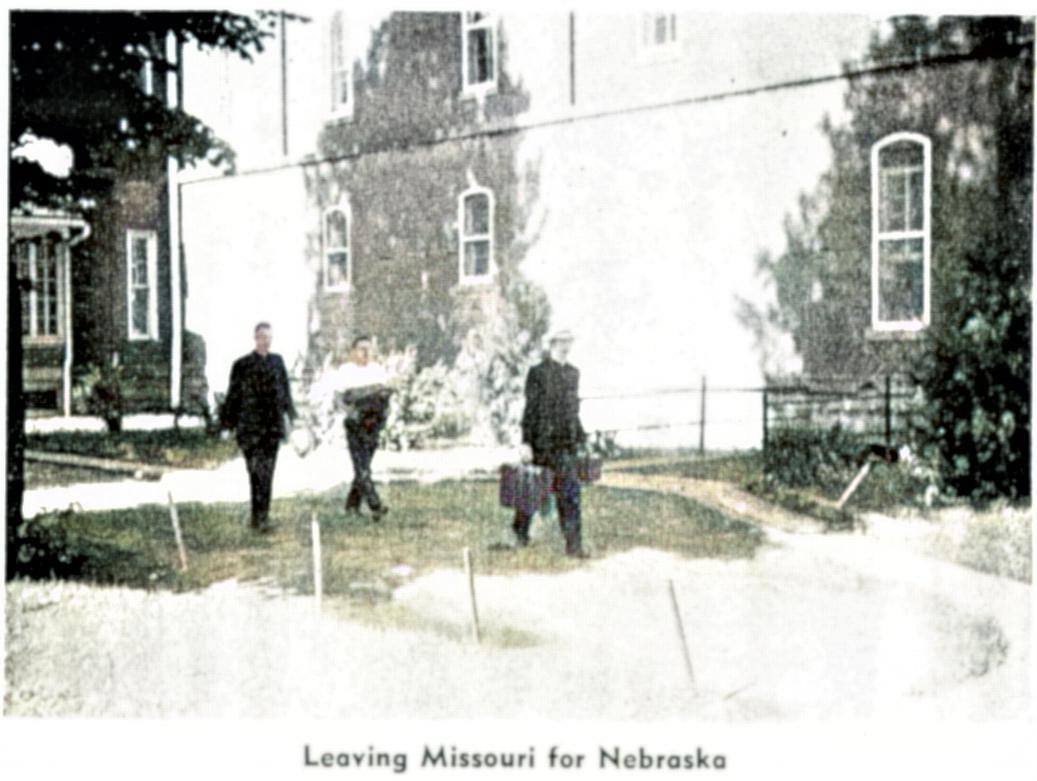
Monks from Conception Abbey leaving for Nebraska

== History ==
The first monks lived in the Olsen family farmhouse and oversaw the conversion of the property to a seminary campus. The monastery would be named Mount Michael because of its location at the highest elevation in Douglas County, Nebraska and because the land was given to the monks on the feast of St. Michael the Archangel.

The first building constructed was a simple chapel for the monks, built on the existing house. The second was for the primary apostolate—educating and forming young men for the priesthood. The breaking ground ceremony for the St. John Vianney Seminary building took place on January 30, 1955, more than a year and a half later the building and the attached new chapel were dedicated on October 28, 1956. Mount Michael hadn't yet constructed a monastery building, so when more monks began arriving from Conception to begin teaching they were forced to live in the seminary attic.

In the early 1960s, the new Prior, Father Anselm Coppersmith, decided to finally move the faculty out of the attic. He initiated the construction of a temporary metal building located a short distance away from the school and the chapel, that would serve the community until a permanent structure could be built.

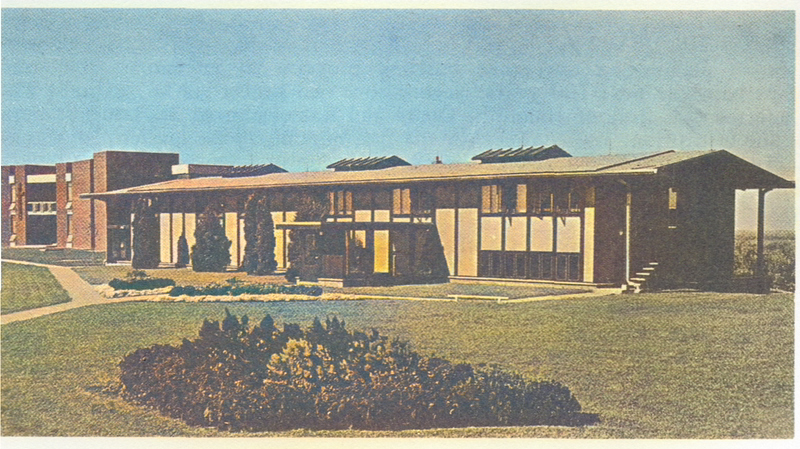
The temporary metal monastery. In the background is the permanent building built later.

To this day, because of the distance between the monastery and the chapel, the monks walk across the grounds to the chapel in the school for the Divine Office and Mass.

In the 1963 Mount Michael, still a priory of Conception Abbey, was given a choice to become an independent priory or become an independent abbey. The monks voted to become an abbey and petitioned the Vatican for abbatial status. Father Raphael Walsh was appointed the first abbot and on October 6, 1964, Mount Michael was raised to abbatial status

== Abbey Community ==
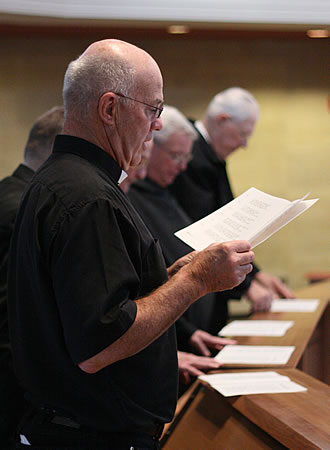
The monks pray the Divine Office

The community closely follows the Rule of Saint Benedict, the communal schedule is a balance of prayer and work that is designed to keep God as the central driving force in the monks' day. The community's Horarium is structured to allow for the main apostolate the attached high school by bringing together the seven hours for the Divine Office into four times of combined offices as well as Mass and Lectio Divina.

The monks convene four times throughout the day to participate in the seven components of the Divine Office. At 6:30 am, they commence Morning Prayer, encompassing Matins, Lauds, Prime, and Terce. Subsequently, at noon, they reconvene for Sext and None, followed by Vespers at 5:15 pm and culminated with Compline at 7:15 pm. In the intervals between these structured prayers, monks dedicate themselves to various forms of manual labor, such as educational activities within the monastery's school or maintenance of the monastery grounds.

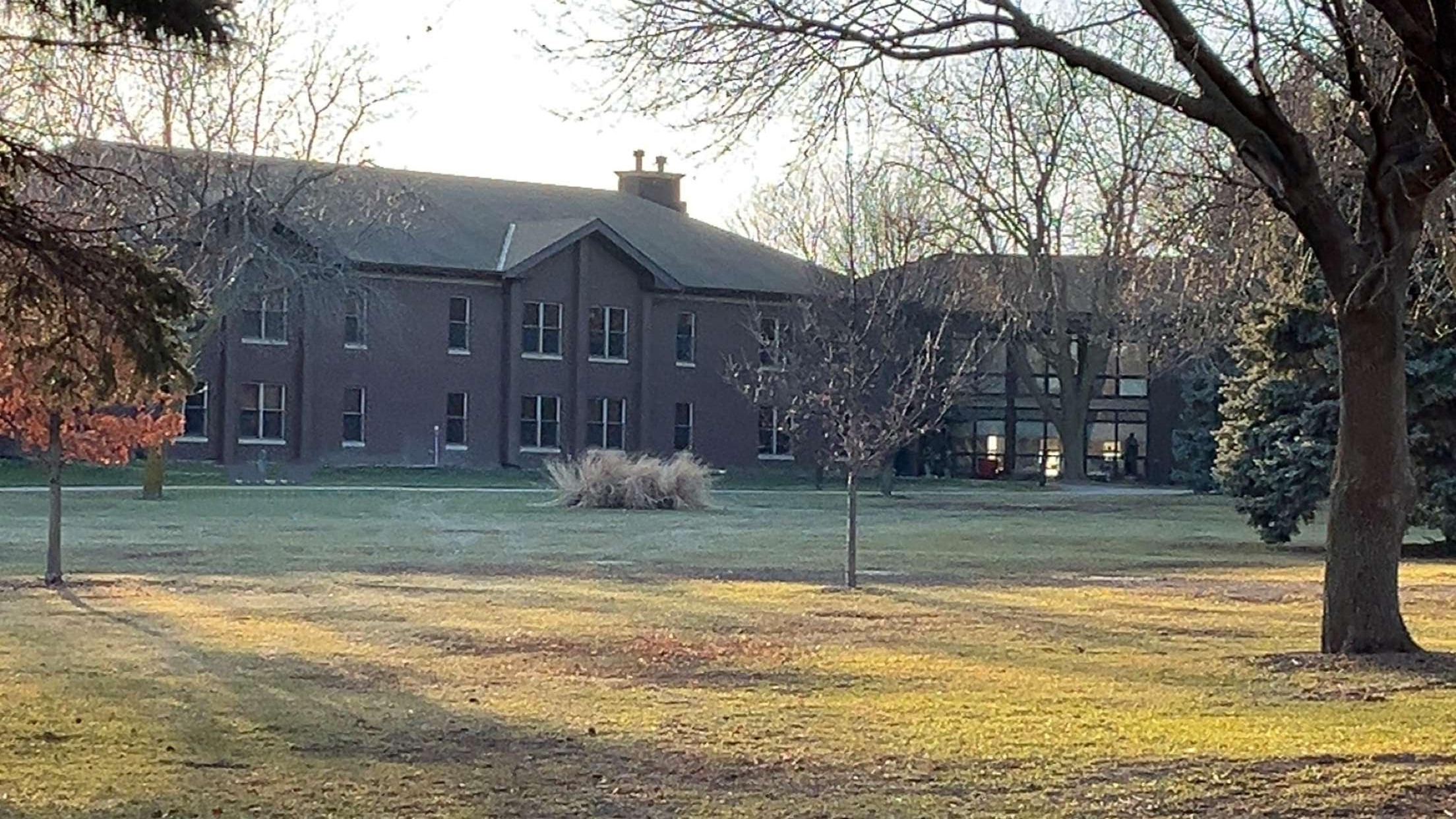
Mount Michael Abbey from the north.

Although the main apostolate of Mount Michael Abbey is its school, there are other apostolates as well. For many years Mount Michael provided priests to help in the Archdiocese of Omaha and other dioceses as well. Another apostolate is hospitality (as per the Rule of St. Benedict), the monks preserved Rex Olson’s house and it is now St. Benedict’s Guest House. They have faithfully cared for this house and provided hospitality in the form of a tea and gift shop.

The work of the monks ranges from teaching at the school, to farming, to making soap and pottery to support the monastery.

Mount Michael currently has around 12 monks and a large number of dedicated Oblates.

In 2001 the community was featured in a documentary called "We Go the Way Together".

== Abbots ==
- 1964-1989: Abbot Raphael Walsh OSB
- 1989-2007: Abbot Theodore Wolff OSB
- 2007–present: Abbot Michael Liebl OSB

== Recent Dangers ==
Mount Michael Abbey has an encroachment crisis driven by expanding real estate development in its vicinity.

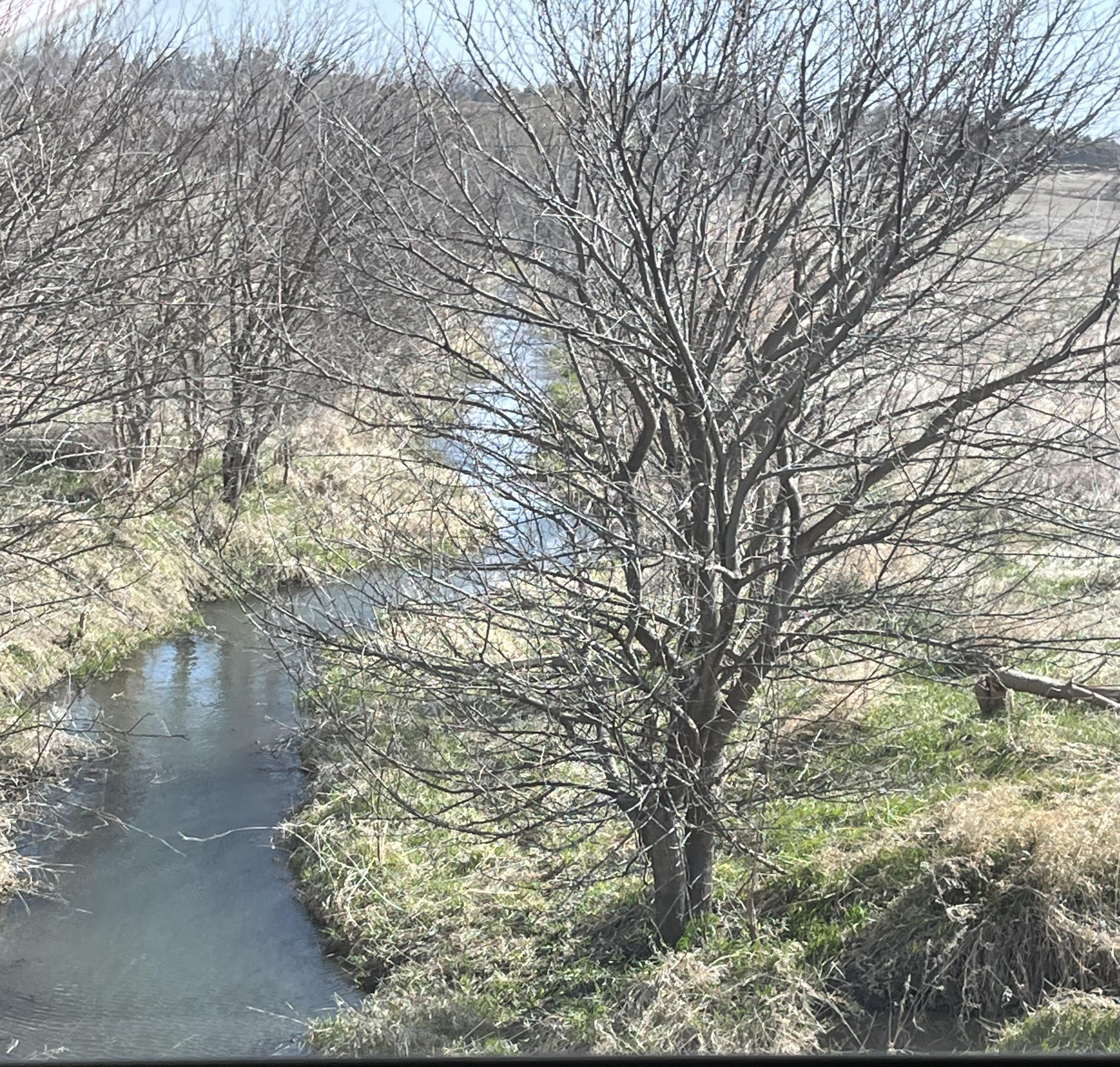
West Papillion Creek near Mount Michael

The construction of Dam Site 12 by the Papio-Missouri River Natural Resources District (NRD) southeast of Mount Michael, aimed at controlling flooding along West Papillion Creek, has been part of a long-term plan spanning a decade. The NRD's practice of selling surplus land to real estate developers has raised concerns about potential housing developments encroaching upon the abbey's borders, mirroring a pattern observed at the conclusion of previous NRD projects. Notably, housing developments have already commenced on the opposite side of 216th Street, with a trajectory suggesting that residential construction will be constructed close to the lake (and the Abbey) upon completion of the Dam Site 12 project.

In response to the threat of encroachment, on 15 July 2024, Mount Michael created a group called the Mount Michael Land Preservation Committee to "preserve and enhance" the land around the abbey.

Mount Michael was also nearly hit by the Great tornado of 4/26/2024, which narrowly missed and struck down a large number of homes on the other side of 216th street

== See also ==
- Swiss-American Congregation
- Conception Abbey
- Rule of Saint Benedict
- Roman Catholic Archdiocese of Omaha
