= Marmion Abbey =

Benedictine monastery in Aurora, Illinois

- Logo of the abbey
- Marmion Abbey
- 41°48′55″N 88°17′50″W
- Country: United States
- Denomination: Catholic Church
- Religious institute: Order of Saint Benedict
- Website: www.benedictinemonks.us

Clergy
- Abbot: Joel Rippinger

Marmion Abbey is a Benedictine community of the Swiss-American Congregation in Aurora, Illinois. It was founded in 1933 from St. Meinrad Archabbey in Indiana.

The principal apostolate of the monks has been Marmion Academy, though a variety of work has been undertaken by them throughout the Fox Valley area and beyond, particularly their mission priory in Quetzaltenango, Guatemala, where they operate a minor seminary, where they live the monastic life and provide pastoral assistance.

The fifth abbot, John Brahill, retired in 2023. His successor, Joel Rippinger, was elected on August 19 of that year.
