= Fintan Mundwiler =

Swiss Benedictine (1835–1898)

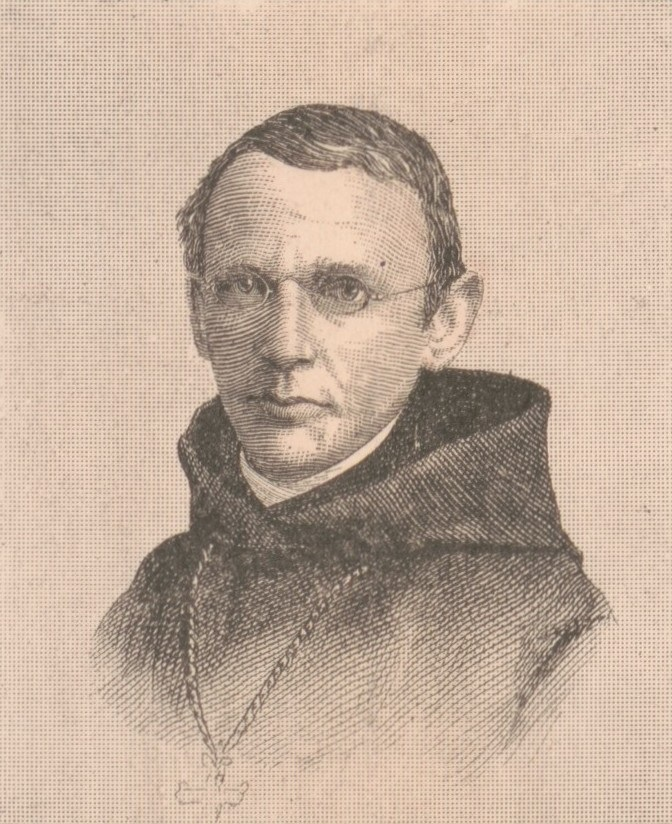
Fintan Mundwiler

Fintan Mundwiler (12 July 1835 at Dietikon in Switzerland – 14 February 1898 at St. Meinrad's Abbey) was a Swiss Benedictine, who became Abbot of St. Meinrad Abbey, Indiana.

== Life ==
Andreas Mundwiler was born 12 July 1835 at Dietikon, Switzerland, the son of Jakob and Anna Maria Seiler Mundwiler. He studied at the monastic school of Einsiedeln in Switzerland, where he took the Benedictine habit in 1854, made profession on 14 October 1855, and was raised to the priesthood on 11 September 1859.

In 1852, Joseph Kundek, vicar-general for Bishop Jacques-Maurice De Saint Palais of the Diocese of Vincennes approached the abbot of Einsiedeln Abbey for assistance in addressing the pastoral needs of the growing German-speaking Catholic population and to prepare local men for the priesthood. The first monks set out in late 1852 for Vincennes, and established a priory and school at Harrison Township, in Spencer County, Indiana.

In 1860 Mundwiler accompanied his confrère, Martin Marty, afterwards Bishop of St. Cloud, to the newly founded monastery of St. Meinrad in Indiana. Marty took charge of the philosophical and theological departments at the college, while Mundwiler handled the classical department.

Mundwiler also attended a few neighbouring missions. While stationed at Terre Haute, Indiana (1864), he organized the German Catholic Congregation of St. Benedict, for which he built a church in 1865. In 1866 he was back at St. Meinrad as prefect of the college. In 1869, when St. Meinrad was raised to an abbey and Marty became its first abbot, Mundwiler was appointed prior and master of novices, and the following year commissioned to raise funds for the construction of a new monastery to replace the original log house.

While Marty worked among the Native Americans in Dakota (1876–80), Mundwiler was administrator of the abbey, and, upon the resignation of the former, who had meanwhile been appointed Vicar Apostolic of Dakota, Mundwiler was elected Abbot of St. Meinrad on 3 February 1880, and received abbatial benediction from Silas Chatard, Bishop of Vincennes, Indiana on 16 May 1880.

He enlarged the college, founded the Priory of Subiaco in Arkansas and the Priory of St. Joseph in Louisiana, and obtained from Rome the permission to erect the Helvetico-American Congregation of Benedictines, of which he became the first president. When St. Meinrad's Abbey was destroyed by fire on 2 September 1887, he rebuilt the monastery on an even greater scale, founded a commercial college at Jasper, Indiana, and assisted in the foundation of the Priory of St. Gall in North Dakota. As abbot, Mundwiler sought to balance the need to maintain monastic spirit and discipline with the obligations of missionary commitments.

He was a fervent promoter of the Priests' Eucharistic League. In October 1885 he returned to Europe, where he stayed until 1886. In 1893 he took part in the Eucharistic Congress held at Jerusalem.

Mundwiler was known for his learning and piety, and for his calm disposition. He died at the abbey on 14 February 1898.
