= Marvin, South Dakota =

- Town
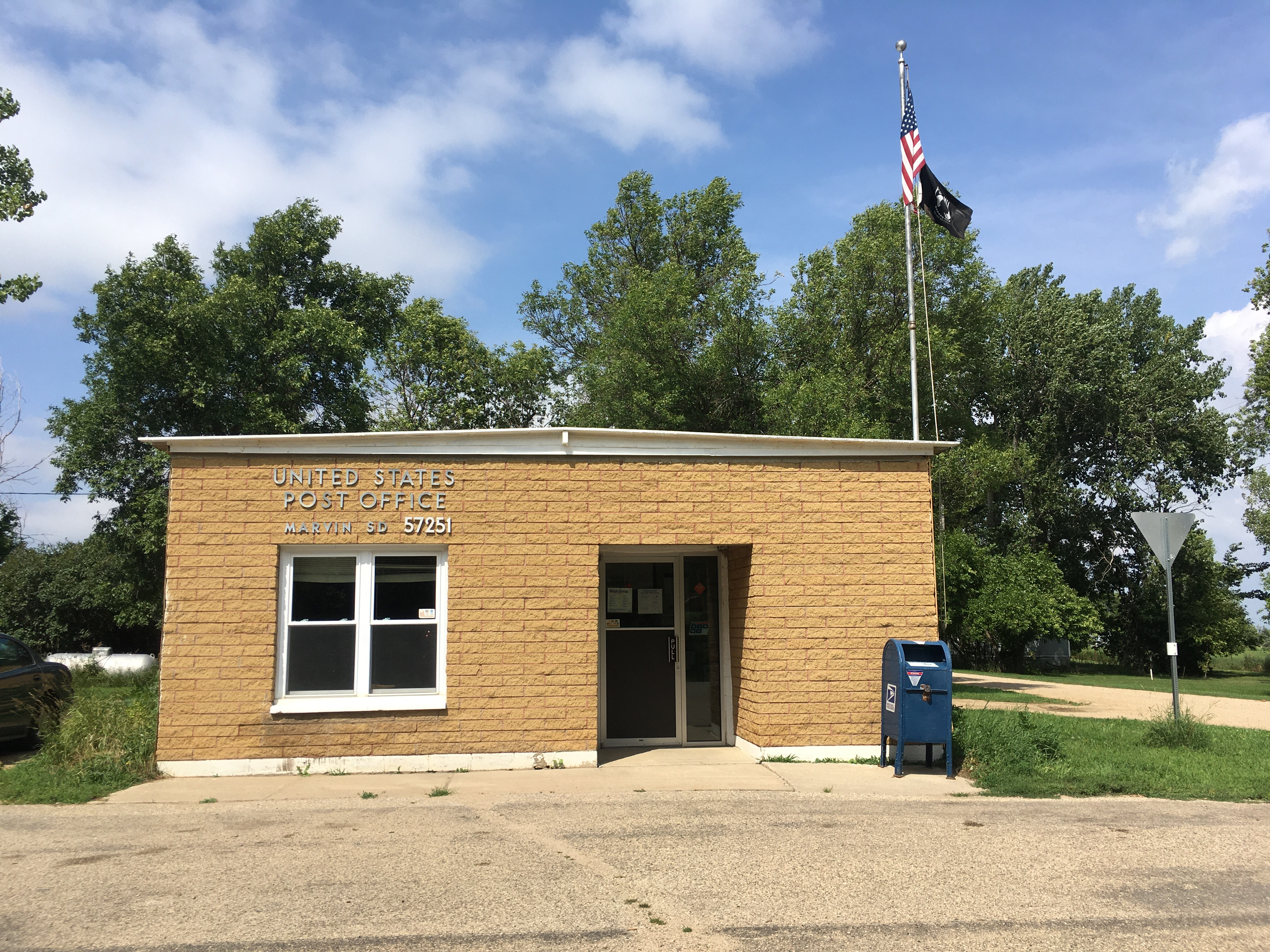
- Marvin, South Dakota Post Office

- Location in Grant County and the state of South Dakota
- Coordinates: 45°15′38″N 96°54′55″W
- Country: United States
- State: South Dakota
- County: Grant
- Incorporated: 1917

Area
  - Total: 0.55 sq mi (1.42 km^{2})
  - Land: 0.55 sq mi (1.42 km^{2})
  - Water: 0 sq mi (0.00 km^{2})
- Elevation: 1,660 ft (510 m)

Population (2020)
  - Total: 19
  - Density: 35/sq mi (13.4/km^{2})
- Time zone: UTC-6 (Central (CST))
  - Summer (DST): UTC-5 (CDT)
- ZIP code: 57251
- Area code: 605
- FIPS code: 46-41220
- GNIS feature ID: 1267472

Marvin is a town in Grant County, South Dakota, United States. The population was 19 at the 2020 census.

Marvin was originally called Grade Siding; during the search for what residents considered a more suitable name, the presence of a Marvin brand safe in town caused the new name to be selected.

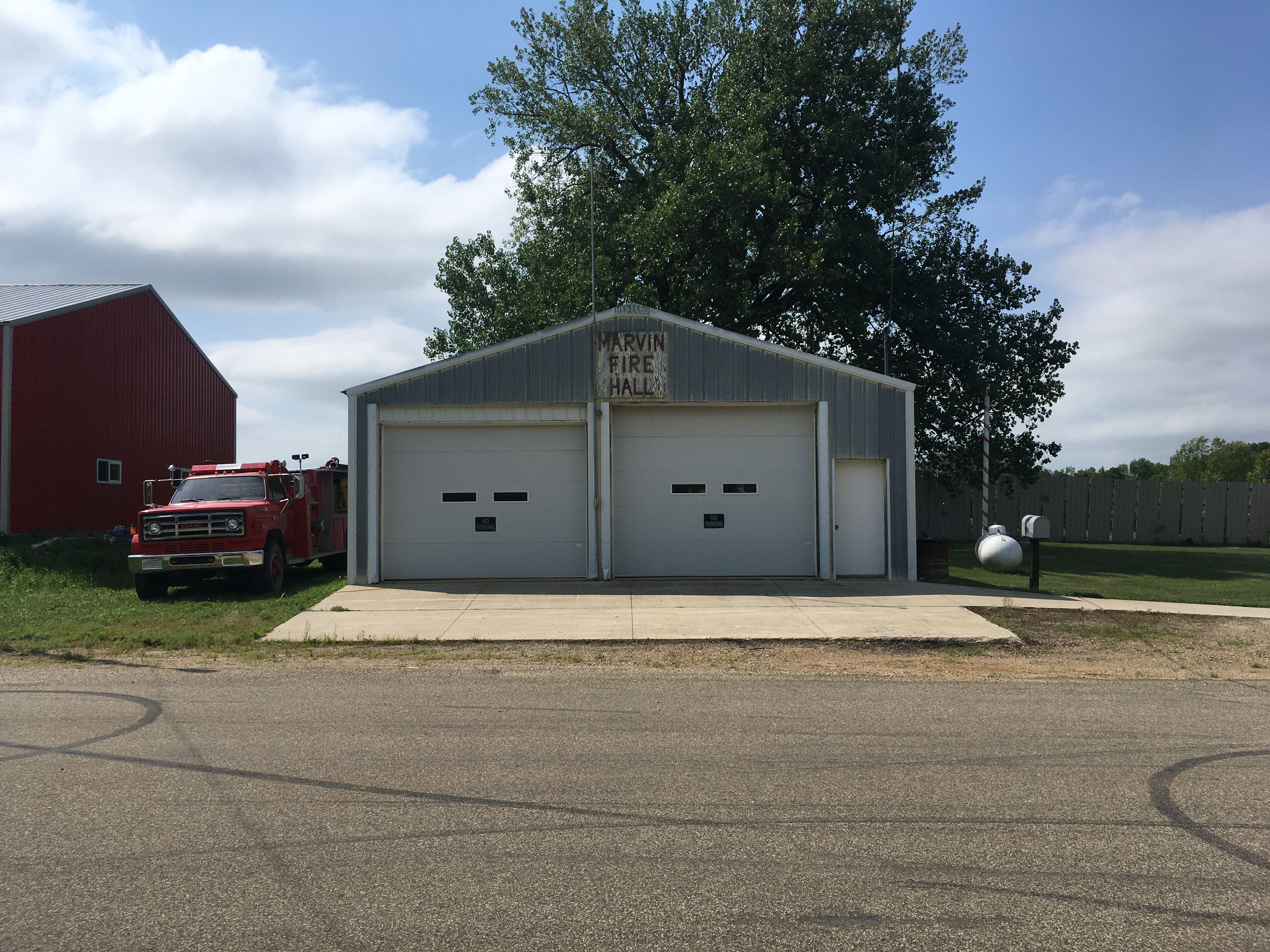
Marvin, South Dakota Fire Hall

== Geography ==
Marvin is located in the headwaters region of the Whetstone River.

According to the United States Census Bureau, the town has a total area of 0.55 square miles (1.42 km^{2}), all land.

== Demographics ==
Historical population
Census	Pop.	Note	%±
1920	173		—
1930	150		−13.3%
1940	164		9.3%
1950	110		−32.9%
1960	93		−15.5%
1970	65		−30.1%
1980	52		−20.0%
1990	38		−26.9%
2000	66		73.7%
2010	34		−48.5%
2020	19		−44.1%
U.S. Decennial Census

=== 2010 census ===
As of the census of 2010, there were 34 people, 15 households, and 10 families residing in the town. The population density was 61.8 inhabitants per square mile (23.9/km^{2}). There were 21 housing units at an average density of 38.2 per square mile (14.7/km^{2}). The racial makeup of the town was 85.3% White, 5.9% Native American, and 8.8% from two or more races.

There were 15 households, of which 26.7% had children under the age of 18 living with them, 60.0% were married couples living together, 6.7% had a male householder with no wife present, and 33.3% were non-families. 33.3% of all households were made up of individuals, and 13.4% had someone living alone who was 65 years of age or older. The average household size was 2.27 and the average family size was 2.90.

The median age in the town was 47.5 years. 14.7% of residents were under the age of 18; 8.7% were between the ages of 18 and 24; 11.8% were from 25 to 44; 47% were from 45 to 64; and 17.6% were 65 years of age or older. The gender makeup of the town was 52.9% male and 47.1% female.

=== 2000 census ===
As of the census of 2000, there were 66 people, 19 households, and 9 families residing in the town. The population density was 121.6 inhabitants per square mile (47.0/km^{2}). There were 28 housing units at an average density of 51.6 per square mile (19.9/km^{2}). The racial makeup of the town was 84.85% White, 13.64% Native American, and 1.52% from two or more races.

There were 19 households, out of which 21.1% had children under the age of 18 living with them, 26.3% were married couples living together, 10.5% had a female householder with no husband present, and 52.6% were non-families. 47.4% of all households were made up of individuals, and 10.5% had someone living alone who was 65 years of age or older. The average household size was 2.21 and the average family size was 3.22.

In the town, the population was spread out, with 19.7% under the age of 18, 3.0% from 18 to 24, 22.7% from 25 to 44, 28.8% from 45 to 64, and 25.8% who were 65 years of age or older. The median age was 47 years. For every 100 females, there were 407.7 males. For every 100 females age 18 and over, there were 430.0 males.

The median income for a household in the town was $17,250, and the median income for a family was $34,375. Males had a median income of $36,250 versus $11,250 for females. The per capita income for the town was $11,405. There were 23.1% of families and 40.2% of the population living below the poverty line, including 52.2% of under eighteens and 57.9% of those over 64.

== Religion ==
Blue Cloud Abbey is a Benedictine monastery located near Marvin.

== See also ==
- List of towns in South Dakota
