= Thomas Bezanson =

Canadian artist and monk (1929–2007)

- Born: Charles Bezanson; August 5, 1929; Halifax, Nova Scotia, Canada
- Died: August 16, 2007 (aged 78); Erie, Pennsylvania, United States
- Education: Nova Scotia College of Art and Design; Art Students League of New York; University of Ottawa
- Known for: Ceramic artist
- Awards: National Endowment for the Arts Grant (1983)

Brother Thomas Bezanson (5 August 1929 – 16 August 2007) was a Canadian-born artist and Benedictine monk primarily known for his porcelain pottery and mastery of complex glazes. Strongly influenced by Asian pottery, he often adapted traditional Chinese and Japanese pottery methods and materials to his work.

== Early life and education ==
Brother Thomas was born in Halifax, Nova Scotia, a descendant of Irish and Scottish families that had been in Nova Scotia for many generations. In 1950 he graduated from Nova Scotia College of Art and Design. He also spent some time in New York City studying at Art Students League of New York. From 1951 to 1958 he both worked in business and was an advisor to the Nova Scotia Handcraft Century. He began working in pottery in 1953. In 1958–59 he traveled and studied in Europe.

== Monastic life and career ==
In 1959, he entered the Benedictine Monastery, Weston Priory, in Weston, Vermont. In 1968 he graduated from the University of Ottawa with a master's degree in philosophy and a University Gold Medal. In 1976 he was a visiting lecturer at Alfred University School of Ceramics. In 1978 he traveled to Japan and Taipei. While in Japan he met five Living National Treasure potters. In 1983 he was awarded a National Endowment for the Arts grant. From 1985 until his death, he was the artist-in-residence at Mount Saint Benedict in Erie, Pennsylvania.

His works are held in more than 80 museum collections. One piece, initially rejected by the artist, is in the collection of the Museum of Fine Arts, Boston.

== Death ==
Brother Thomas died at his home in Erie, Pennsylvania, on 16 August 2007.

== Brother Thomas Fund ==
The Brother Thomas Fund was established under the auspices of the Boston Foundation upon the artist's death. Since 2007, proceeds from the sale of his work have supported the fund. In October 2009, the first eight Brother Thomas Fellowships were awarded to mid-career Boston artists, each receiving $15,000.

The fund is also supported by donations and by sales of Brother Thomas's work through the Pucker Gallery in Boston. As of 2021, the fund had awarded $1,080,000 in grants to 72 artists. Fellowships are awarded every two years.

== Exhibitions and honors ==
- National Endowment for the Arts Grant, 1983
- Retrospective Exhibition, Erie Art Museum, Erie, Pennsylvania, 1990
- Retrospective Exhibition, Art Gallery of Nova Scotia, Halifax, Nova Scotia, 1991

== Known collections ==
- Aidekman Art Center, Tufts University, Medford, Massachusetts
- Allen Art Museum, Oberlin College, Oberlin, Ohio
- Art Complex Museum, Duxbury, Massachusetts (Note: Additional information available at the museum's website.)
- Art Gallery of Nova Scotia, Halifax, Nova Scotia, Canada
- Art Institute of Chicago, Chicago, Illinois
- Bunting Institute, Radcliffe College, Cambridge, Massachusetts
- Canadian Museum of Civilization, Hull, Quebec, Canada
- Carnegie Museum of Art, Pittsburgh, Pennsylvania
- Chrysler Museum of Art, Norfolk, Virginia
- Cleveland Museum of Art, Cleveland, Ohio
- Cooper-Hewitt, National Design Museum, Smithsonian Institution, New York, New York
- Davis Museum and Cultural Center, Wellesley College, Wellesley, Massachusetts
- Dimock Gallery, George Washington University, Washington, D.C.
- Everson Museum of Art, Syracuse University, Syracuse, New York
- Fleming Museum, University of Vermont, Burlington, Vermont
- Fogg Art Museum, Harvard University, Cambridge, Massachusetts
- Framingham State University, Framingham, Massachusetts
- Hokkaido University, Hokkaido, Japan
- Los Angeles County Museum of Art, Los Angeles, California
- The Metropolitan Museum of Art, New York, New York
- Museum of Art, Rhode Island School of Design, Providence, Rhode Island (Note: A note on the museum's acquisition is available in their archived acquisitions page.)
- Museum of Fine Arts, Boston, Massachusetts
- Phoenix Art Museum, Phoenix, Arizona
- Portland Museum of Art, Portland, Maine
- Pucker Gallery, Boston, Massachusetts
- Roberson Museum and Science Center, Binghamton, New York
- The Rose Art Museum, Brandeis University, Waltham, Massachusetts
- Royal Ontario Museum, Toronto, Ontario, Canada
- Santa Barbara Museum of Art, Santa Barbara, California
- St. Lawrence University, Canton, New York
- Smithsonian American Art Museum (Note: The museum featured highlights of Brother Thomas's work in their collection.)
- Tel Aviv Museum of Art, Tel Aviv, Israel
- The Tikotin Museum of Japanese Art, Haifa, Israel
- University of Massachusetts Amherst, Massachusetts
- Vatican Collection, Rome, Italy
- Victoria and Albert Museum, London, England
- Windsor Castle, Windsor, England
- Worcester Art Museum, Worcester, Massachusetts (Note: A note on the museum's acquisition is available in their archived collection pages.)
- Yale University, New Haven, Connecticut

== Publications ==
- The Path to the Beautiful. Boston: David R. Godine Publishers. 1988. ISBN 0-87923-699-X.
- Gifts From the Fire. Boston: Pucker Gallery. 1993.
- Creation out of Clay. Boston: Pucker Gallery. 1999.
- Celebrate the Days: Brother Thomas Book of Days. Boston: Pucker Art Publications. 2000.
- This Is the Day: Work and Words of Brother Thomas. Boston; Syracuse: Pucker Art Publications; Syracuse University Press. 2007. ISBN 978-0-8028-6312-6.

== Images ==
- Pucker Gallery: An image gallery
- Brother Thomas Small lidded vase with celadon glaze, ca. 1980
- The Art Museum Image Consortium Library Vase, Flask Form, Hunan Tenmoku, 1988
- Harrison Gallery: An image gallery
