= Thai Americans =

Americans of Thai birth or descent

ชาวอเมริกันเชื้อสายไทย
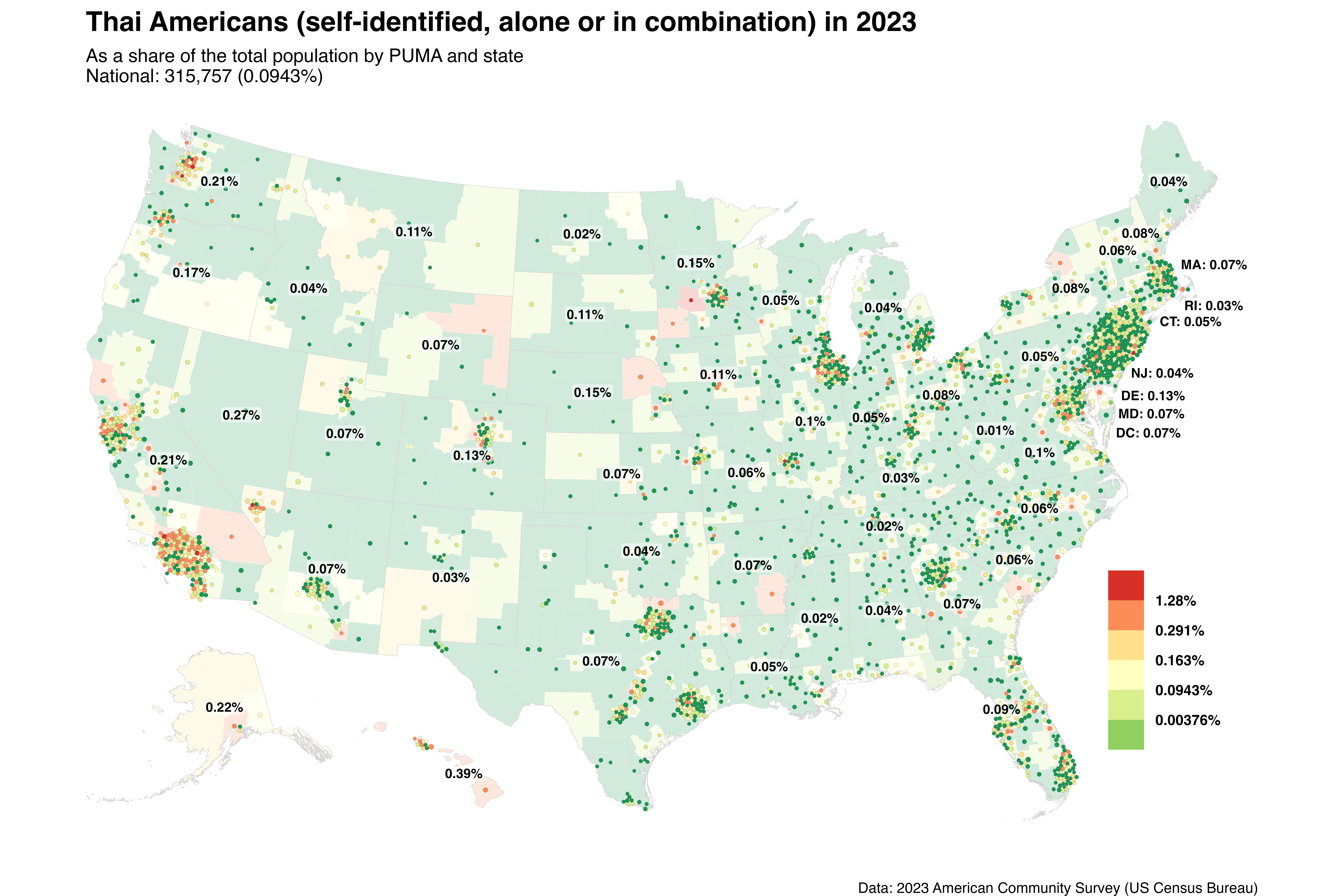

Total population
- 343,265 (2023) (ancestry or ethnic origin); 252,638 (2023) (Born in Thailand)

Regions with significant populations
- Illinois (Chicago), Virginia (Alexandria), California (Los Angeles, San Francisco, Long Beach, Riverside), Nevada (Las Vegas), Wisconsin (Madison), Washington (Seattle), Oregon (Portland), Pennsylvania (Pittsburgh), Alaska (Anchorage), Hawaii (Honolulu), Texas (Houston, Austin, Dallas, San Antonio), Arizona (Phoenix), New Mexico (Albuquerque), Georgia (Atlanta), Massachusetts (Greater Boston)

Languages
- American English, Thai, Lanna, Isan, Karen

Religion
- Theravada Buddhism, Tai folk religion, Mahayana Buddhism, Vajrayana Buddhism, Christianity

Related ethnic groups
- Laotian Americans, Burmese Americans, Cambodian Americans, Hmong Americans, other Asian Americans

Thai Americans, formerly referred to as Siamese Americans, are Americans of Thai ancestry. The Thai American population is racially and ethnically diverse, consisting of many Thais who identify as mixed race.

== History in the United States ==
Siamese people were named as one of the many Asian groups excluded from immigrating to the United States by the Immigration Act of 1917. The law was one of many provisions restricting Asian immigration to the United States in the early 20th century.

The 1930 Census recorded just 18 Siamese Americans. According to the MPI Data Hub, there have been a total of 253,585 Thai people who have immigrated to the United States as of 2016. That year, they were 0.0057% of all immigrants. In comparing data from the MPI Data Hub to the U.S. Census Bureau, there are significant inconsistencies of total current population. According to the U.S. Census, there are currently 300,319 Thai people living in the United States today, with an error margin of ± 14,326.

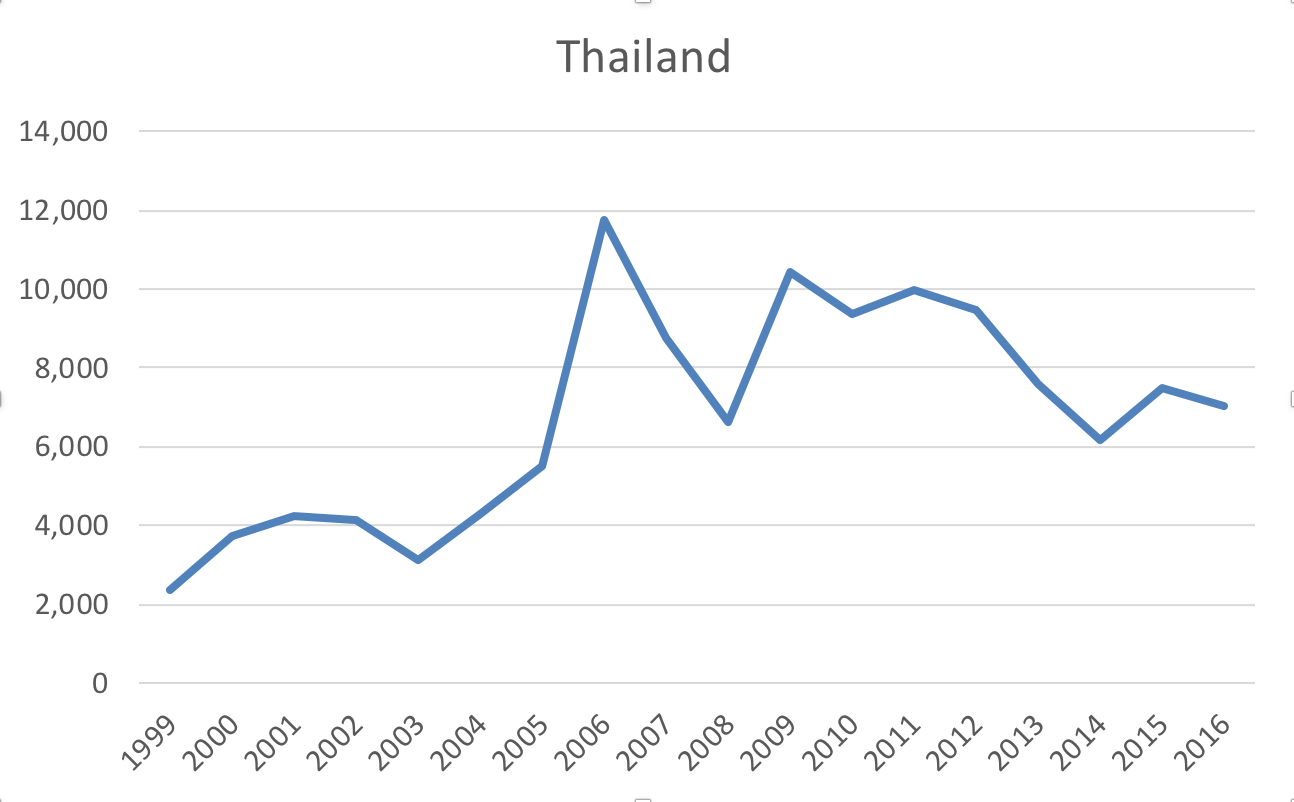
Data Compiled from MPI Data Hub

Thai immigration to the United States proceeded very slowly. It began in earnest during and after the Vietnam War, in which Thailand was an ally of the United States and South Vietnam. Records show that, in the decade between 1960 and 1970, some 5,000 Thais immigrated to the United States. In the following decade, the number increased to 44,000. From 1981 to 1990, approximately 64,400 Thai citizens moved to the United States.

The general trend of Thai immigration can be stated at a relatively steady rising pace save for the peak in 2006, which marks the dissolution of the Thai Parliament in February and a subsequent coup in the following September. From 2007 to 2008, numbers dip back down to regular rate until 2009, which proceeded a year of military and political turmoil due to the disconnect between the monarchic Royal Army and the relatively newly established democratic government in 2006.

According to the 2000 census there were 150,093 Thais in the United States.

In 2009, 304,160 U.S. residents listed themselves as Thais.

== Demographics ==
Los Angeles, has the largest Thai population outside of Asia. It is home to the world's first Thai Town. In 2002, it was estimated that over 80,000 Thais and Thai Americans live in Los Angeles. Other large or sizeable Thai communities are in Clark County, Nevada; Cook County, Illinois; Tarrant County, Texas; Orange County, California; San Bernardino County, California; San Diego County, California; San Francisco; Fresno, California; Sacramento, California; King County, Washington; Fairfax County, Virginia; Philadelphia; Albuquerque, New Mexico; Queens, New York; Madison, Wisconsin; Seattle; and Montgomery County, Maryland. The 2010 U.S. census counted 237,629 Thai Americans in the country, of whom 67,707 live in California.

=== Statistics ===
Data from Migration Policy Institute
Data from Pew Research Center

Thai-born population:

| Year | Number | Margin of error |
|---|---|---|
| 2000 | 169,801 | - |
| 2006 | 186,526 | +10,506 |
| 2007 | 195,948 | +9,668 |
| 2008 | 199,075 | +8,633 |
| 2009 | 203,384 | +8,921 |
| 2010 | 222,759 | +9,960 |
| 2011 | 239,942 | +13,087 |
| 2015 | 295,000 | - |
| 2019 | 343,000 | - |

New legal permanent residents:

| Year | Number |
|---|---|
| 2000 | 3,753 |
| 2001 | 4,245 |
| 2002 | 4,144 |
| 2003 | 3,126 |
| 2004 | 4,318 |
| 2005 | 5,505 |
| 2006 | 11,749 |
| 2007 | 8,751 |
| 2008 | 6,637 |
| 2009 | 10,444 |
| 2010 | 9,384 |
| 2011 | 9,962 |
| 2012 | 9,459 |
| 2013 | 7,583 |
| 2014 | 6,197 |
| 2015 | 7,502 |
| 2016 | 7,039 |

Thais who acquire US citizenship:

| Year | Number |
|---|---|
| 2000 | 5,197 |
| 2001 | 4,088 |
| 2002 | 4,013 |
| 2003 | 3,636 |
| 2004 | 3,779 |
| 2005 | 4,314 |
| 2006 | 4,583 |
| 2007 | 4,438 |
| 2008 | 6,930 |
| 2009 | 4,962 |
| 2010 | 4,112 |
| 2011 | 5,299 |
| 2012 | 6,585 |
| 2013 | 5,544 |
| 2014 | 4,805 |
| 2015 | 5,213 |
| 2016 | 5,211 |

== Cultural influence on America ==
Thai Americans are famous for bringing Thai cooking to the United States. Thai cuisine is popular across the country. Even non-Thai restaurants may include Thai-influenced dishes on their menu like pad thai and Thai tea.

Thai culture's prominence in the United States is disproportionate to their numbers. The stationing of American troops in Thailand during the Vietnam War exposed the GIs to Thai culture and cuisine, and many of them came home with Thai wives.

== Political involvement ==
In 2003, two Thai Americans ran in municipal elections, one in Anaheim, California, the other in Houston, Texas. Both lost. However, on November 7, 2006, Gorpat Henry Charoen became the first U.S. official of Thai origin when he was elected to the La Palma City Council in California. On December 18, 2007, he became the first Thai-American mayor of a U.S. city.

In 2010, Charles Djou became the first Thai American elected to Congress; he had previously served in the Hawaii State House and Honolulu City Council.

Tammy Duckworth, a Thai-born American Iraq War veteran, ran for Congress as a Democrat in Illinois's 6th district in the 2006 mid-term election. She was narrowly defeated, and served for two years as Assistant Secretary of Public and Intergovernmental Affairs for the United States Department of Veterans Affairs. She was previously the director of the Illinois Department of Veterans Affairs. She was considered a likely nominee for appointment to the United States Senate to fill the vacancy caused by Barack Obama's election to the Presidency of the United States; however, Roland Burris was appointed instead. On November 6, 2012 Duckworth was elected to the U.S. House of Representatives to represent the 8th District of Illinois. On November 8, 2016, she was elected as the junior U.S. senator from Illinois, the seat previously held by Barack Obama.

King Bhumibol Adulyadej of Thailand was born at the Mount Auburn Hospital in Cambridge, Massachusetts, on December 5, 1927. At the time, his father was studying at Harvard University. He is the only American-born monarch in history.

In 2017, Ekamon Venin was appointed and later elected to the Borough Council in Pompton Lakes, New Jersey. In 2020, he served as Council President and was re-elected to another 3-year term.

== Notable Thai Buddhist temples in the United States ==
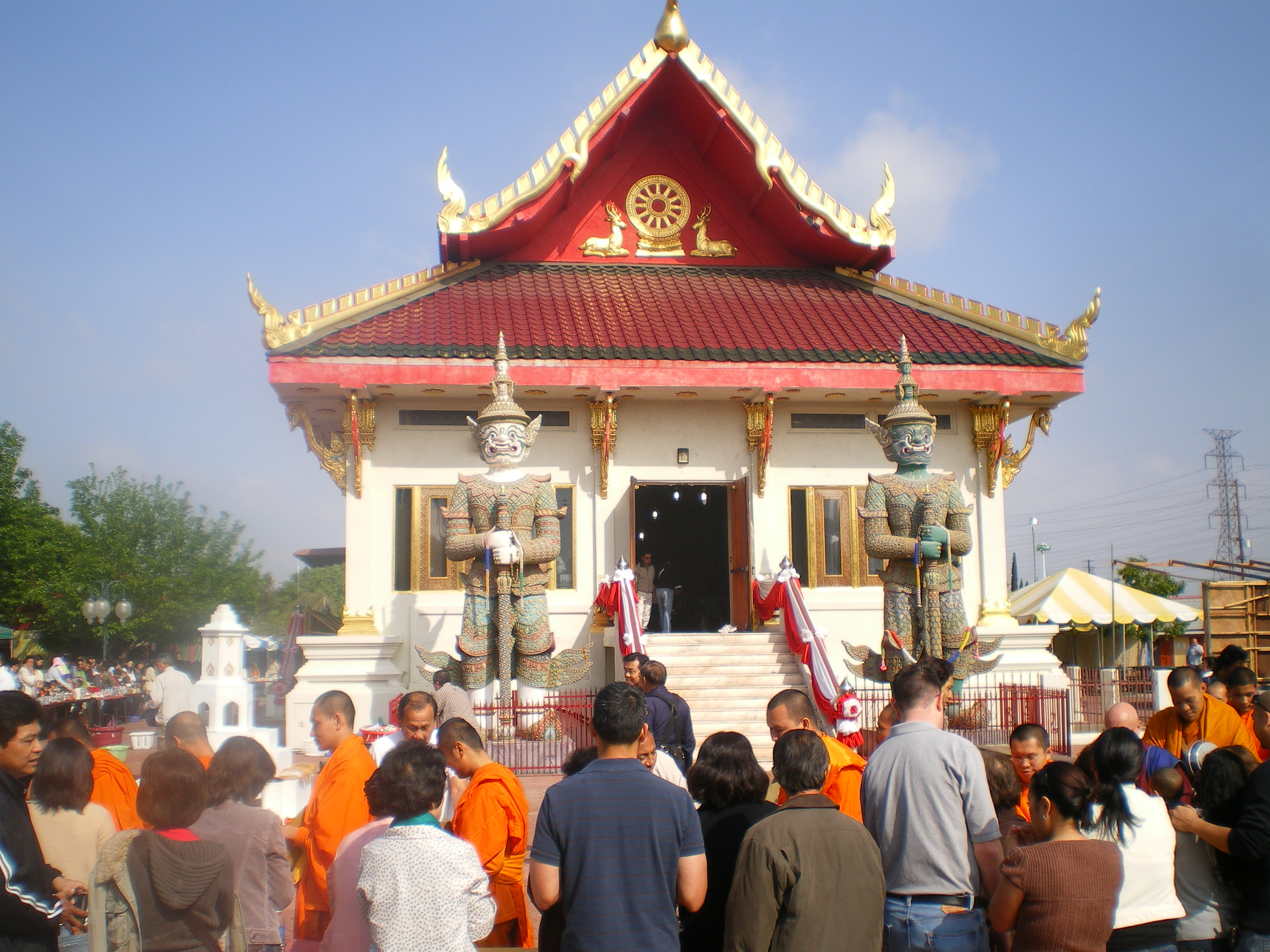
Songkran festival at Wat Thai, Los Angeles, 2008

- Abhayagiri Buddhist Monastery, Redwood Valley, California
- San Fran Dhammaram Temple, San Francisco
- Vajiradhammapadip Temple, Centereach and Mount Vernon in New York
- Wat Boston Buddha Vararam, Bedford, Massachusetts
- Wat Buddhananachat of Austin, Del Valle, Texas
- Wat Buddhamanee Rattanaram, Arnold, Missouri
- Wat Buddhasamakeevanaram, Bossier City, Louisiana
- Wat Buddhanusorn, Fremont, California
- Wat Carolina Buddhajakra Vanaram, Bolivia, North Carolina
- Wat Florida Dhammaram, Kissimmee, Florida
- Wat Mettāvarānaṁ, Valley Center, California
- Wat Mongkolratanaram, Berkeley, California
- Wat Dhammakaya, Azusa, California
- Wat Mongkolratanaram, Tampa, Florida
- Wat Nawamintararachutis, Raynham, Massachusetts
- Wat Pasantidhamma, Carrollton, Virginia
- Wat Thai DC, Silver Spring, Maryland
- Wat Phrasriratanaram, Florissant, Missouri

== Notable people ==
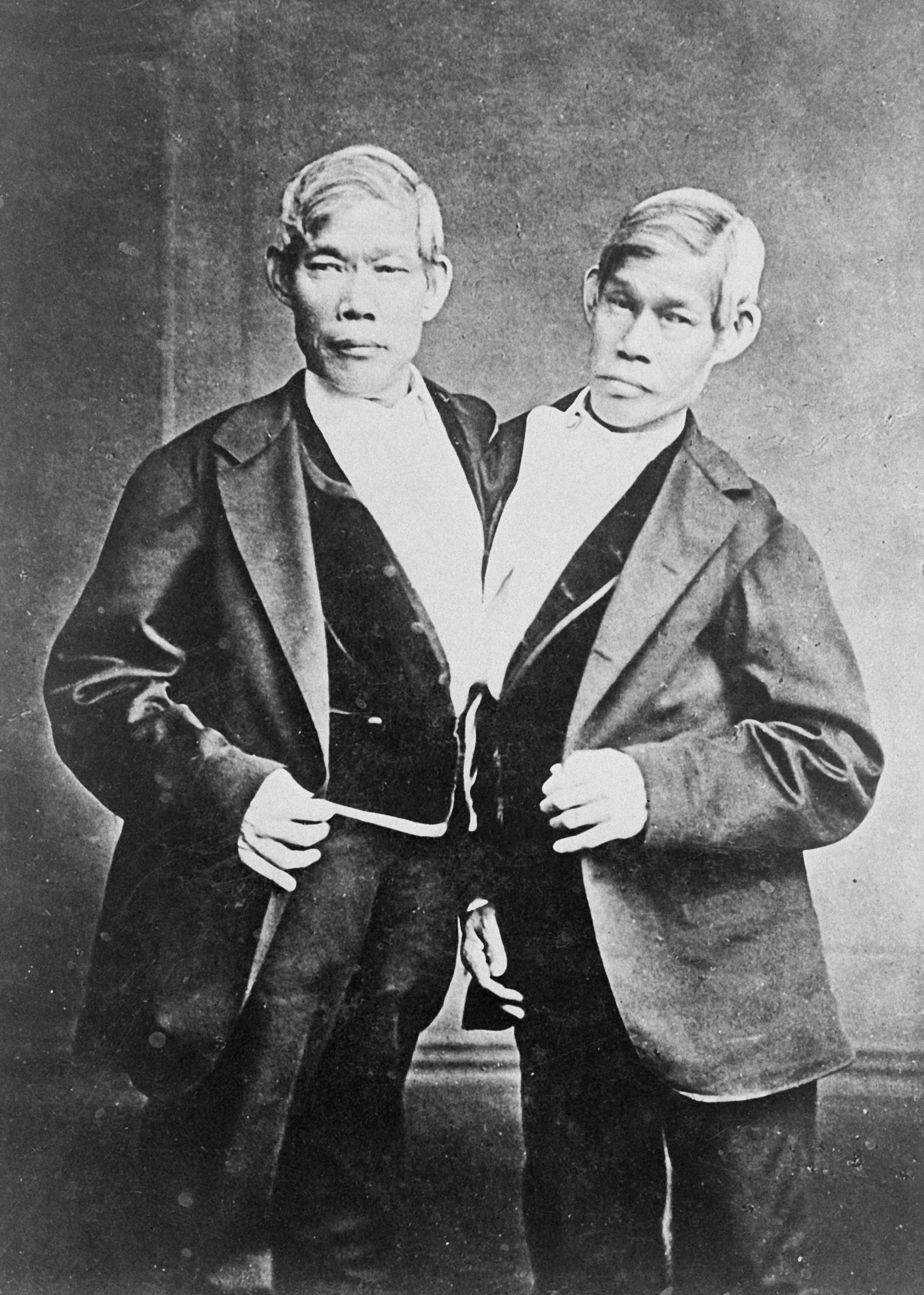
Chang and Eng Bunker

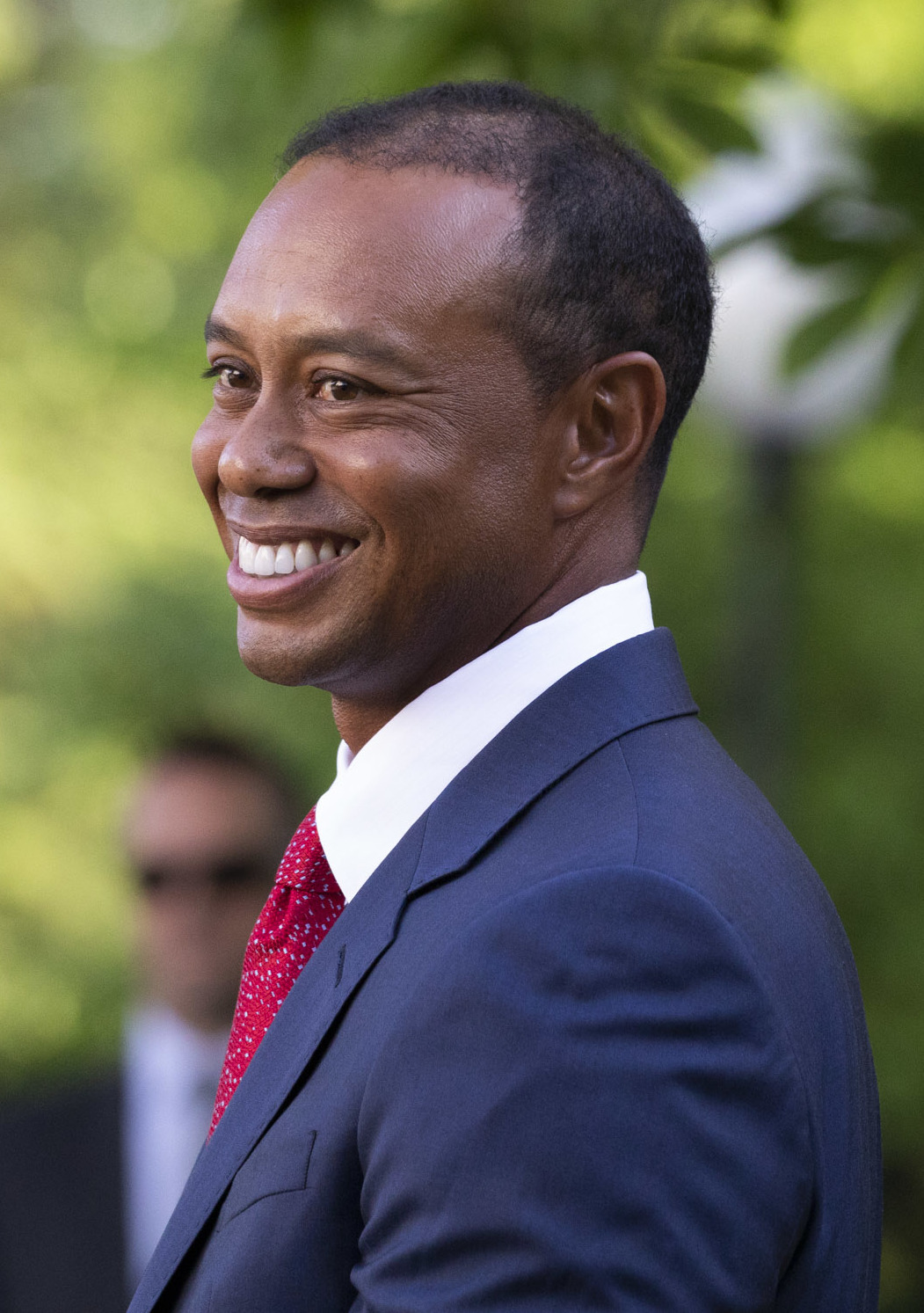
Tiger Woods

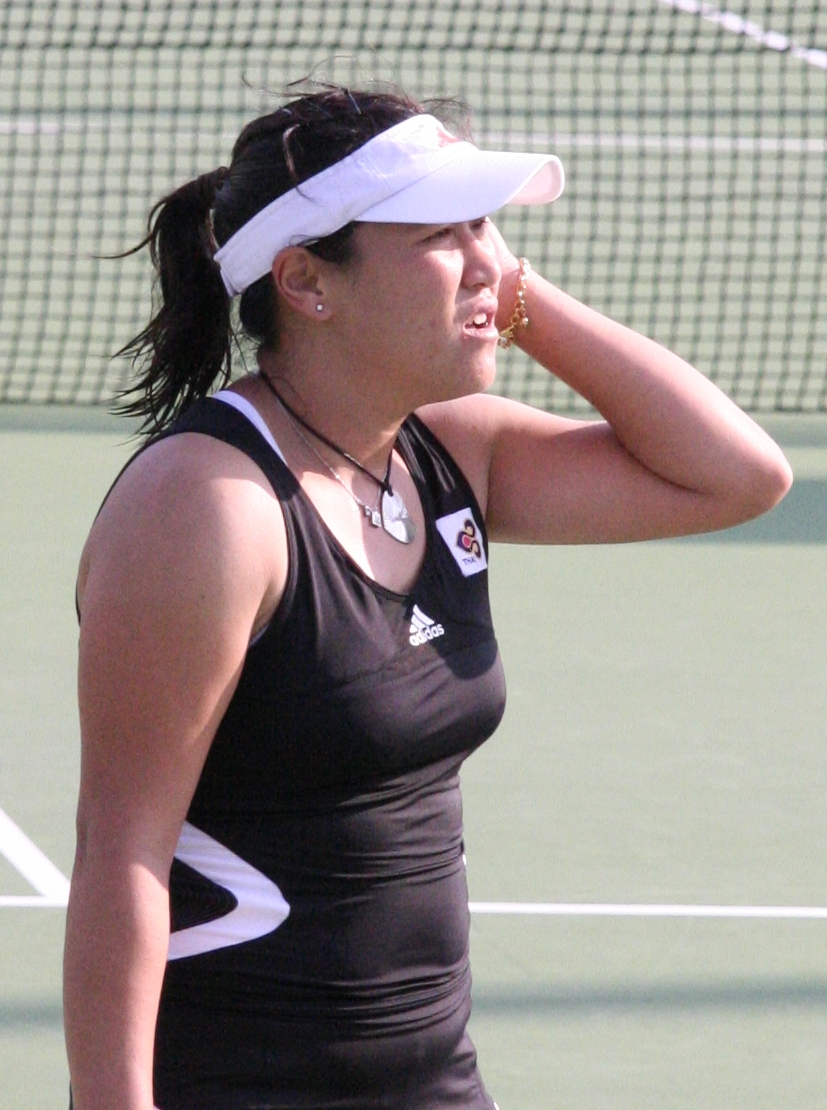
Tamarine Tanasugarn

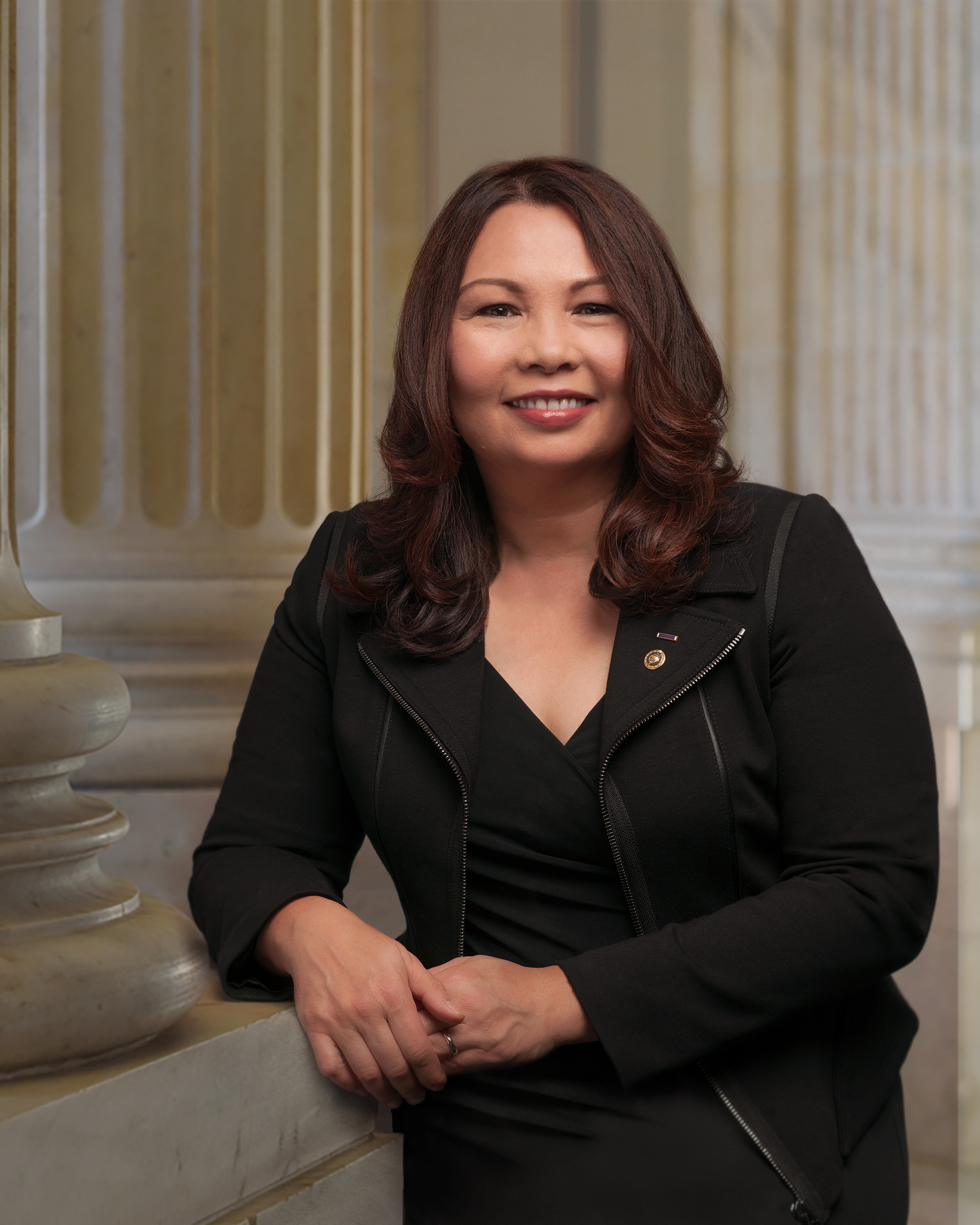
Tammy Duckworth

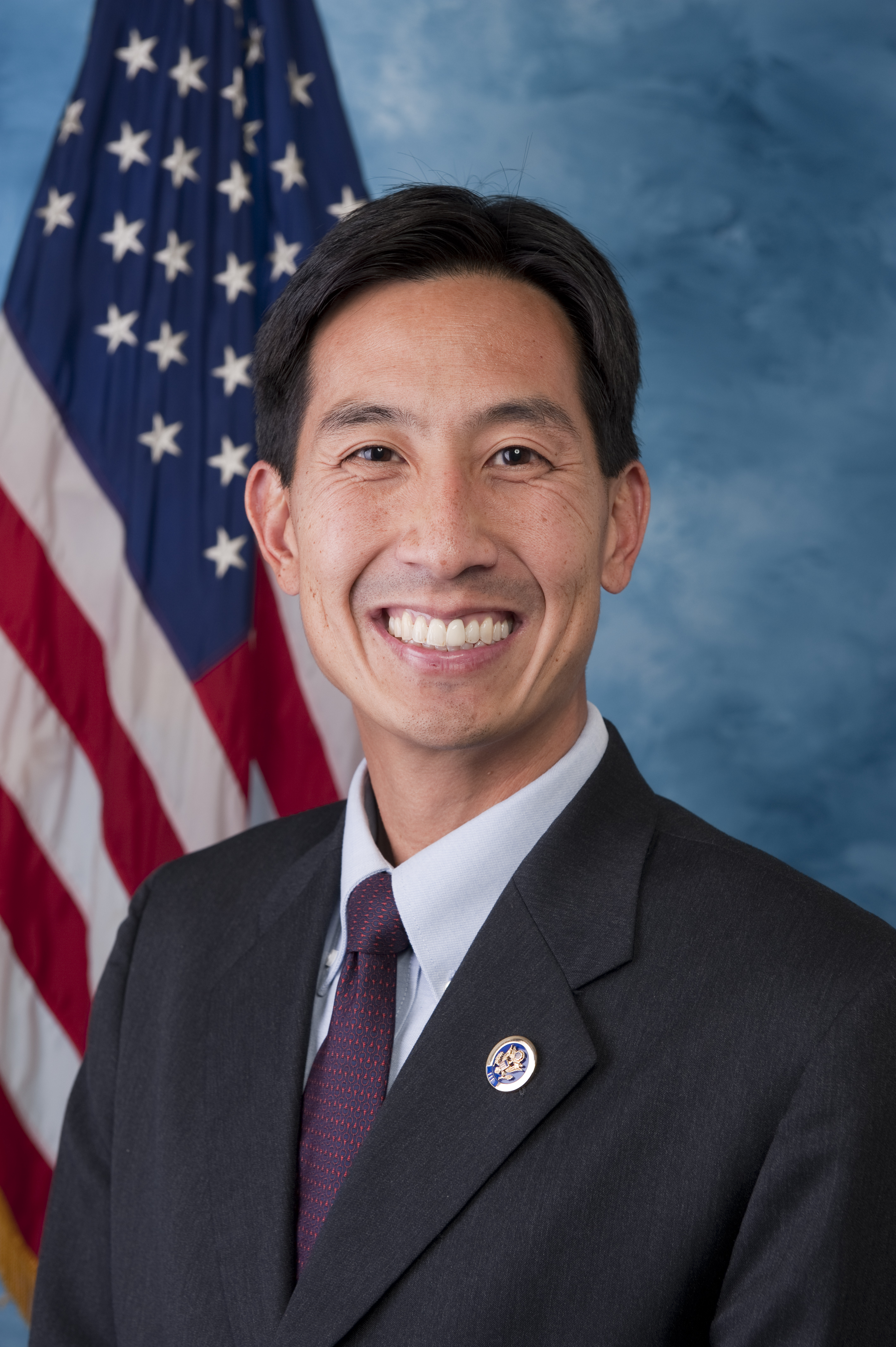
Charles Djou

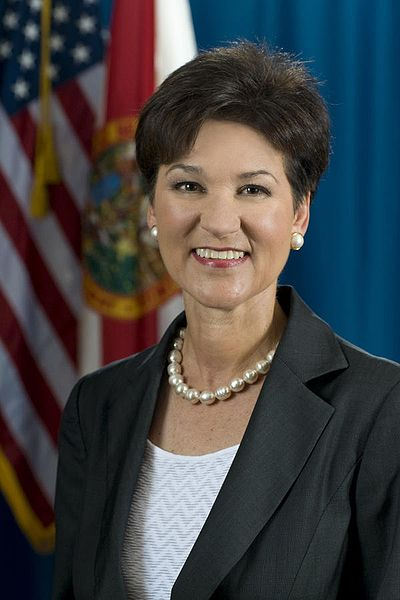
Alex Sink

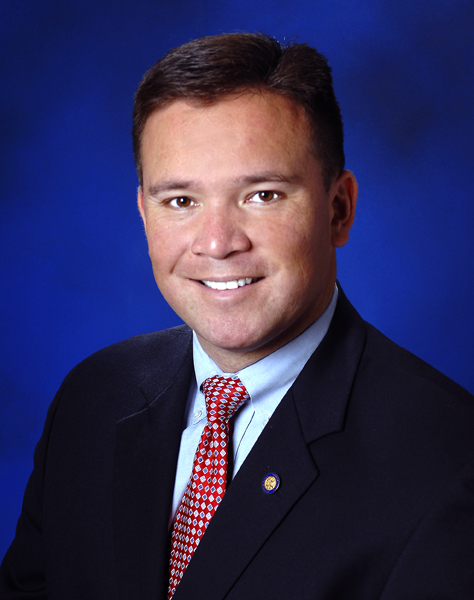
John Pippy

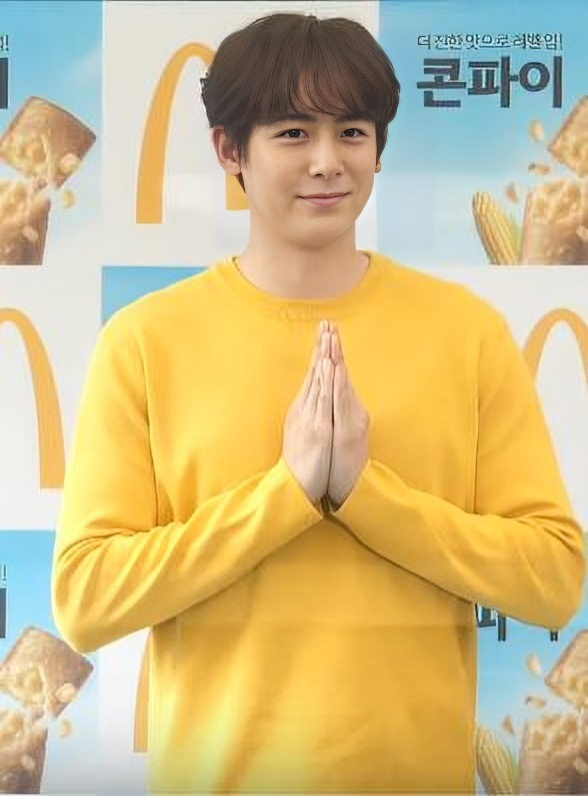
Nichkhun

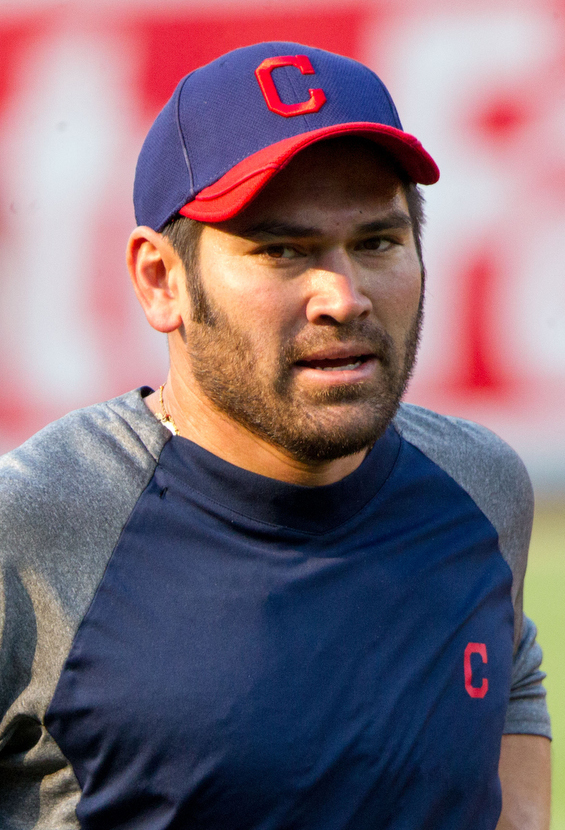
Johnny Damon

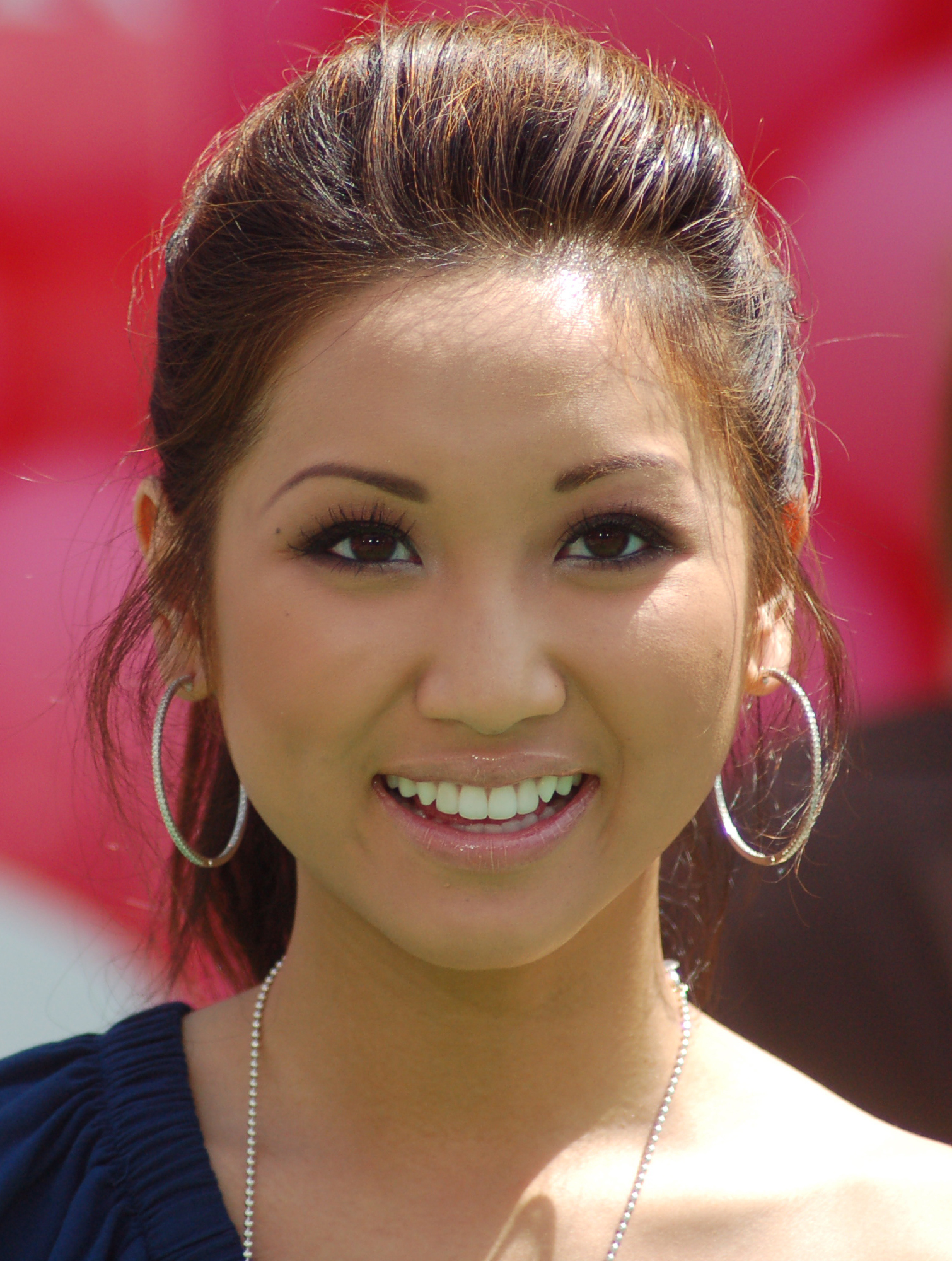
Brenda Song

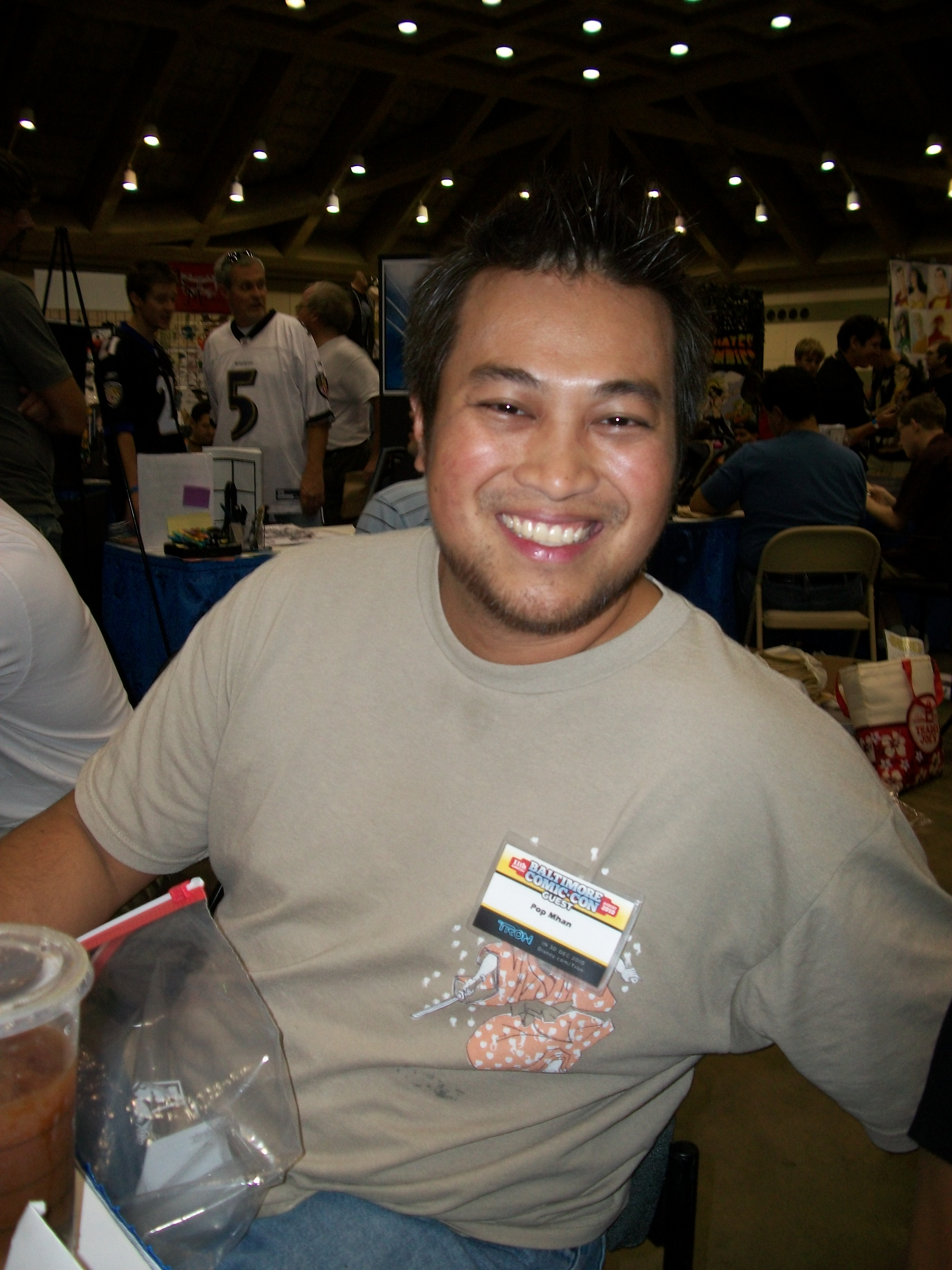
Pop Mhan

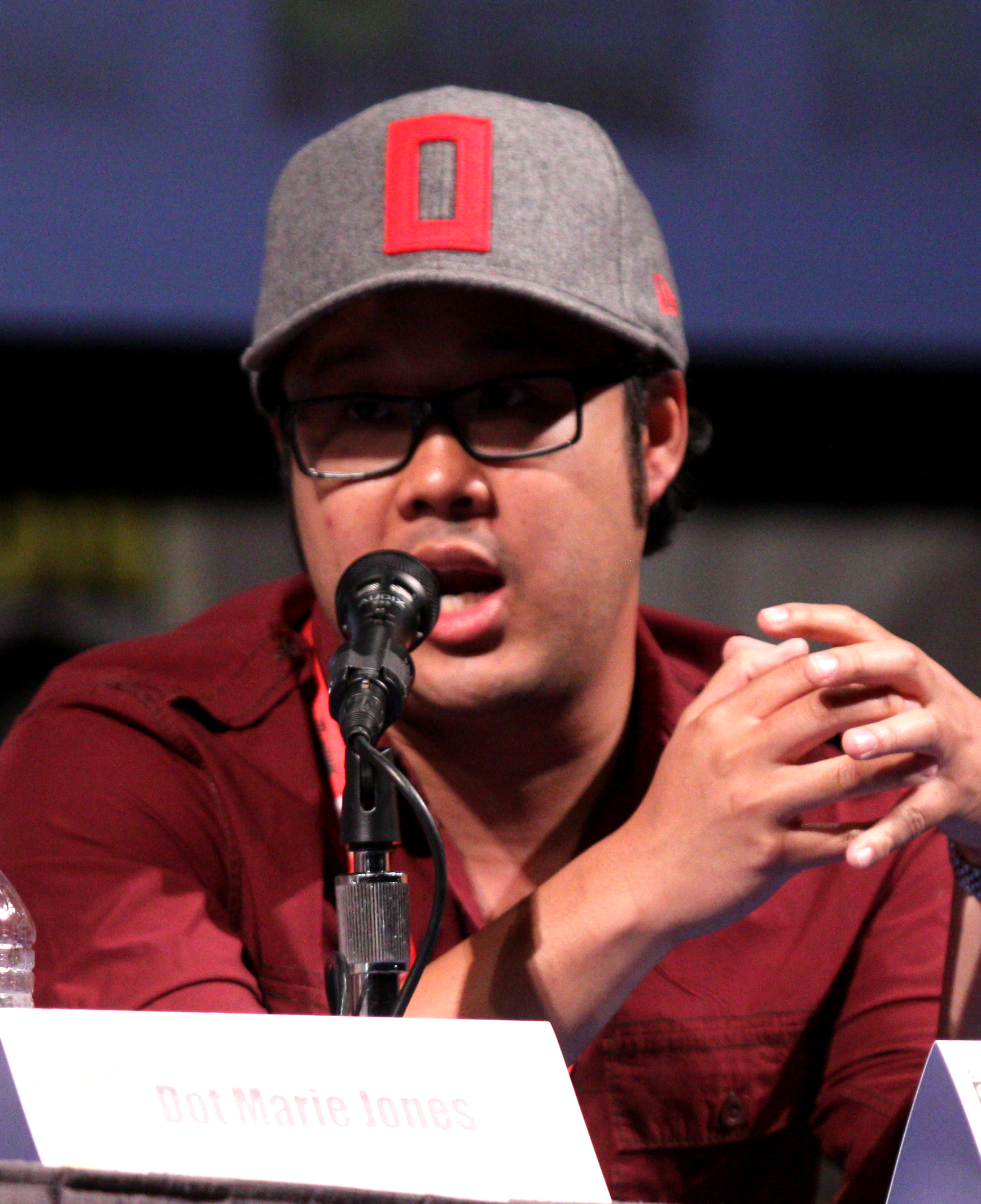
Kevin Tancharoen

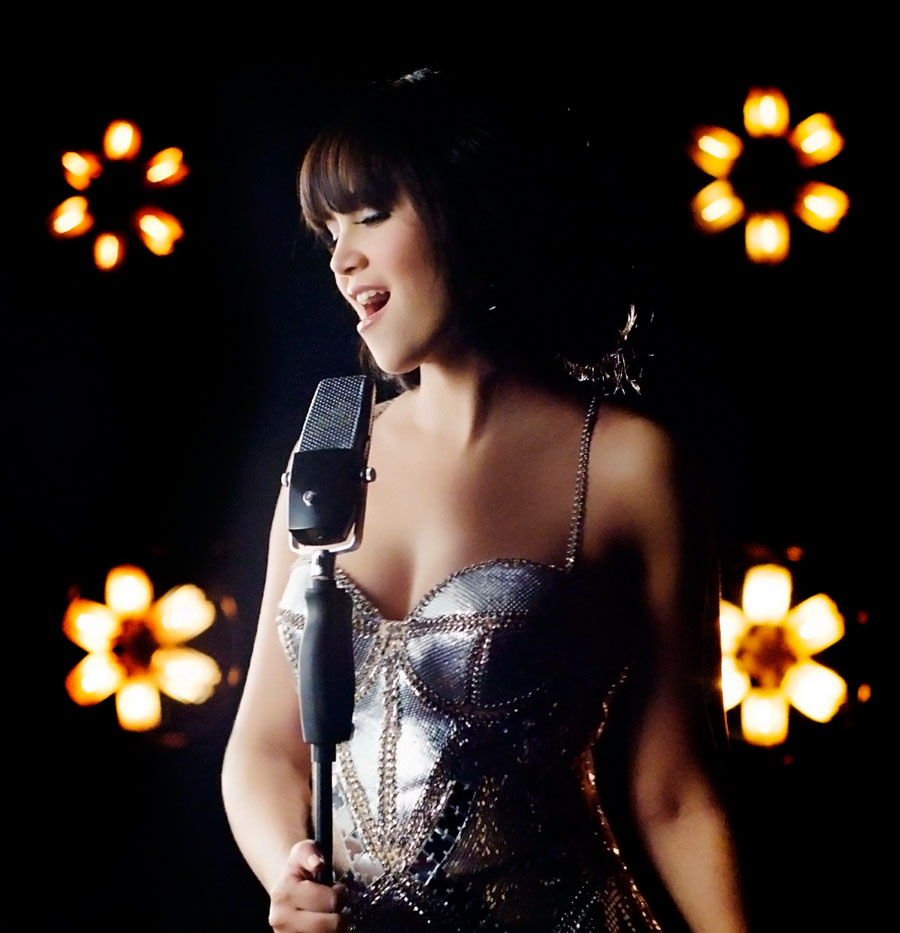
Tata Young

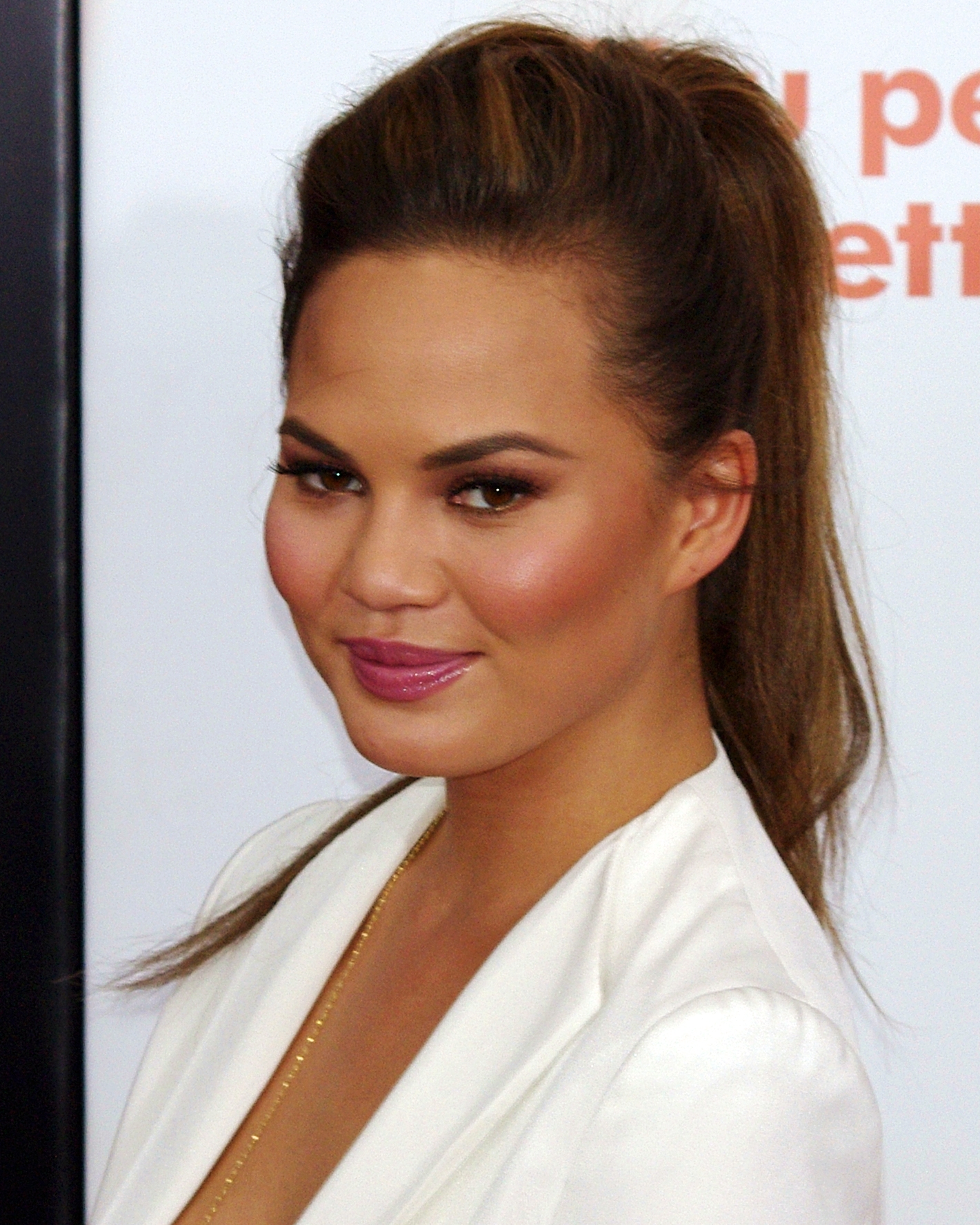
Chrissy Teigen

- Miranda Nild, professional soccer player
- Pornthip Nakhirunkanok Simon, Miss Universe 1988
- Allison Sansom, Miss Universe Thailand 2014
- Anthony Ampaipitakwong, professional soccer player
- Todd Angkasuwan, music video and documentary film director
- Chang and Eng Bunker, Siamese twins
- Anthony Burch, writer of video game Borderlands 2
- Amanda Mildred Carr, BMX racer
- Lisa Changadveja, political strategist and author
- Michael Chaturantabut, actor and martial artist
- Cherry Chevapravatdumrong, producer and story editor on Family Guy
- Johnny Damon, MLB player
- Timothy DeLaGhetto, internet and television personality and rapper
- Charles Djou, politician
- Tammy Duckworth, politician and military officer
- Myra Molloy, singer and actress
- Lada Engchawadechasilp, beauty pageant queen
- Kevin Kaesviharn, football player
- Sanit Khewhok, artist
- Eric Koston, professional skater
- Lynn Kriengkrairut, ice dancer
- Nicolene Limsnukan, Miss Thailand World 2018
- Nichkhun, singer
- Thakoon Panichgul, fashion designer
- Utt Panichkul, actor, model and VJ
- Ben Parr, author
- John Pippy, politician
- Stacy Prammanasudh, golfer
- Jocelyn Seagrave, television actress
- Alex Sink, former Chief Financial Officer for the state of Florida
- Prim Siripipat, sportscaster
- Brenda Song, actress
- Ashly Burch, actress
- Tamarine Tanasugarn, professional tennis player
- Kevin Tancharoen, dancer, choreographer, television producer and film director
- Maurissa Tancharoen, actress, singer, dancer, television producer/writer and lyricist
- Chrissy Teigen, model, TV host, food blogger
- Traphik or Timothy DeLaGhetto, rapper, comedian, and videographer on YouTube
- David Wagner (soccer), United States men's national soccer team striker of Thai descent
- Michelle Waterson-Gomez, mixed martial artist, actress, stuntwoman and model
- Tiger Woods, professional golfer
- Tata Young, singer, actress and former model who lives in Bangkok
- Janie Tienphosuwan, actress
- Prince Gomolvilas, playwright
- Pop Mhan, comic book writer
- Dan Santat, author and winner of the 2015 Caldecott Medal.
- Jet Tila, celebrity chef and restaurateur
- Matt Braly, creator of Amphibia
- Vicha Ratanapakdee, Thai-American man who was murdered in San Francisco
- Tera Patrick, pornstar
- Tony Jaa, Muay Thai fighter, martial artist, actor, action choreographer, stuntman, and film director
- Alex Aust, lacrosse player
- Ethan Cha, politician
- Fue Lee, politician

== Thai Americans in popular culture ==
- Anne Boonchuy and her parents from the animated TV series Amphibia are Thai-Americans.
- Molly McGee, Darryl McGee, Sharon McGee, Grandma Nin Suksai, David Suksai and Emmie Suksai from the animated TV series The Ghost and Molly McGee are Thai-Americans.
- Stonecutter (Utama Somchart) and Avenger X (Cressida) from Marvel Comics are Thai-Americans.

== See also ==
- Thailand–United States relations
- Thai Canadians
- Thais in the United Kingdom
- Thai Town, Los Angeles

== Sources ==
1. We the People Asians in the United States Census 2000 Special Reports
2. Vong, Pueng. Unrest in the Homeland Awakens the Thai Community IMDiversity March 29, 2006
3. Asian American Action Fund 2006 endorsed candidates
