= Miss Universe Thailand 2014 =

15th Miss Universe Thailand pageant

- Date: 17 May 2014
- Presenters: Willy McIntosh, Elizabeth Sadler Leenanuchai
- Entertainment: Rueangrit Siriphanit, Poptorn Suntornyarnkij, The Star 10 & Sugar Eyes
- Venue: Royal Paragon Hall, Siam Paragon, Bangkok, Thailand
- Broadcaster: Channel 3
- Entrants: 40
- Placements: 10
- Winner: Pimbongkod Chankaew, Bangkok (Assumed); Weluree Ditsayabut, Kanchanaburi (Resigned)

Miss Universe Thailand 2014, the 15th Miss Universe Thailand pageant was held at Royal Paragon Hall, Siam Paragon in Bangkok on 17 May 2014. The contestants camped in Roi Et. before flying back to Bangkok for the final stage. Chalita Yaemwannang, Miss Universe Thailand 2013, crowned her successor at the end of this event.

In the final round, broadcast live on Channel 3. Weluree Ditsayabut, was crowned Miss Universe Thailand 2014 by Chalita Yaemwannang, Miss Universe Thailand 2013. Welureet resigned next month later and 1st Runner-up Allison Sansom represented Miss Thailand at Miss Universe 2014 pageant, but not take over the Miss Universe Thailand title.

== Results ==
=== Placements ===
| Placement | Contestant |
|---|---|
| Miss Universe Thailand 2014 | Kanchanaburi – Weluree Ditsayabut (Resigned) |
| 1st Runner-Up | Bangkok – Allison Sansom (Assumed) |
| 2nd Runner-Up | Bangkok – Teeyapar Sretsirisuvarna (Dethroned) |
| Top 10 | Ratchaburi - Ployputchara Sridara; Roi Et - Supatsara Vallsawad; Pathum Thani - Warunchana Radomlek; Nakhon Ratchasima - Natvaran Pongboon; Bangkok - Rinlapat Veerachaivong; Nakhon Ratchasima - Chanaporn Jaroensuk; Chiang Mai - Woraluck Jaija |

== Delegates ==
40 delegates have been confirmed. The information from Miss Universe Thailand Official website

| Number | Contestant | Age | Height (cm) | Height (ft) | Province |
|---|---|---|---|---|---|
| 1 | Phimphakan Baiya | 20 | 172 | 5'8" | Nan |
| 2 | Ployputchara Sridara | 22 | 167 | 5'6" | Ratchaburi |
| 3 | Supatsara Vallsawad | 19 | 168 | 5'6" | Roi Et |
| 4 | Pitakporn Injaidee | 23 | 173 | 5'8" | Suphan Buri |
| 5 | Namphon Sirikul | 22 | 167 | 5'6" | Bangkok |
| 6 | Ingfah Kedkhum | 18 | 169 | 5'7" | Khon Kaen |
| 7 | Warunchana Radomlek | 18 | 172 | 5'8" | Pathum Thani |
| 8 | Kwannakorn Chaiwan | 23 | 168 | 5'6" | Phatthalung |
| 9 | Voranitha Silpavechakul | 21 | 173 | 5'8" | Pathum Thani |
| 10 | Pornratsamee Pittayaratsopon | 22 | 180 | 5'11" | Bangkok |
| 11 | Atital Pimolwattana | 21 | 169 | 5'7" | Tak |
| 12 | Sasithorn Sananoue | 21 | 166 | 5'5" | Bangkok |
| 13 | Natvaran Pongboon | 19 | 167 | 5'6" | Nakhon Ratchasima |
| 14 | Artima Netthip | 23 | 165 | 5'5" | Bangkok |
| 15 | Jiraporn Teansri | 22 | 175 | 5'9" | Ubon Ratchathani |
| 16 | Chonlachat Sa-ngiam | 20 | 172 | 5'8" | Lopburi |
| 17 | Weluree Ditsayabut | 22 | 170 | 5'7" | Kanchanaburi |
| 18 | Rinlapat Veerachaivong | 18 | 169 | 5'7" | Bangkok |
| 19 | Watcharee Amornpairoj | 20 | 166 | 5'5" | Phuket |
| 20 | Marisa Piaplook | 21 | 168 | 5'6" | Lampang |
| 21 | Duangjai Phoin | 19 | 167 | 5'6" | Bangkok |
| 22 | Patcharada Monthathip | 19 | 172 | 5'8" | Udon Thani |
| 23 | Supapada Phureepong | 22 | 165 | 5'5" | Phitsanulok |
| 24 | Nicharee Jermrod | 20 | 172 | 5'8" | Phitsanulok |
| 25 | Sarocha Sirinopakun | 18 | 174 | 5'9" | Bangkok |
| 26 | Nirada Chetsadapriyakun | 21 | 172 | 5'8" | Roi Et |
| 27 | Allison Sansom | 19 | 182 | 6'0" | Bangkok |
| 28 | Natacha Clemente Wilson | 19 | 168 | 5'6" | Chonburi |
| 29 | Sudaporn Wongsasiripat | 20 | 172 | 5'8" | Nakhon Si Thammarat |
| 30 | Maneerat Sriwijan | 20 | 169 | 5'7" | Roi Et |
| 31 | Chanaporn Jaroensuk | 20 | 168 | 5'6" | Nakhon Ratchasima |
| 32 | Nantaporn Chaiwirattana | 21 | 174 | 5'9" | Chaiyaphum |
| 33 | Anette Chewta Schulz | 24 | 166 | 5'5" | Bangkok |
| 34 | Woraluck Jaija | 18 | 170 | 5'7" | Chiang Mai |
| 35 | Arisara Silapasiliporn | 19 | 174 | 5'9" | Bangkok |
| 36 | Phattharaporn Sonthiphak | 18 | 172 | 5'8" | Suphan Buri |
| 37 | Nannapat Vittayaruengsook | 18 | 173 | 5'8" | Bangkok |
| 38 | Kanokphan Apichaianant | 24 | 171 | 5'7" | Chaiyaphum |
| 39 | Teeyapar Sretsirisuvarna | 21 | 168 | 5'6" | Bangkok |
| 40 | Yanisa Insomboon | 20 | 172 | 5'8" | Nakhon Pathom |

=== Disqualified ===
- #2 Kamphaeng Phet – Fongpikun Thonglim

=== Replace ===
- #2Ratchaburi – Ployputchara Sridara
