= Chalita =

Chalita (Thai: ชลิตา; from Pali: jalitā) is a Thai feminine given name that may refer to

- Chalita Suansane (born 1994), Thai model and beauty pageant titleholder
- Chalita Yaemwannang (born 1988), Thai model and beauty pageant titleholder
