= Pimbongkod Chankaew =

Thai-American beauty pageant contestant

- Born: Allison Sansom; July 31, 1994 (age 32); Eagle Rock, Los Angeles, California, U.S.
- Height: 1.82 m (6 ft 0 in)
- Beauty pageant titleholder
- Title: Miss Universe Thailand 2014
- Hair color: Brown
- Eye color: Brown
- Major competitions: Miss Universe Thailand 2014 (1st Runner-Up); Miss Universe 2014 (Unplaced)

Allison Sansom (born July 31, 1994), also known as by Thai name Pimbongkod Chankaew (Thai: พิมบงกช จันทร์แก้ว; RTGS: Phimbongkot Chankaeo) is a Thai-American beauty pageant titleholder. She placed first runner-up at Miss Universe Thailand 2014 and represented Thailand in the Miss Universe 2014 pageant after the winner Weluree Ditsayabut resigned her title.

== Early life and education ==
Sansom was born and raised in Eagle Rock, Los Angeles, to a German-American father and a Thai-American mother. In 2012, she graduated from Eagle Rock High School and she studied at Pasadena City College in California, United States.

== Pageantry ==
Sansom competed in Miss Universe Thailand 2014 and won first runner-up. A month later, Weluree Ditsayabut, who was crowned Miss Universe Thailand 2014, resigned her title, Sansom represented Thailand at Miss Universe 2014. Although considered to be a strong candidate by many, she failed to place in the Top 15.

Awards and achievements
Preceded by Chalita Yaemwannang	Thailand representatives at Miss Universe; 2014	Succeeded by Aniporn Chalermburanawong
