= Miss Universe 2014 =

63rd Miss Universe pageant

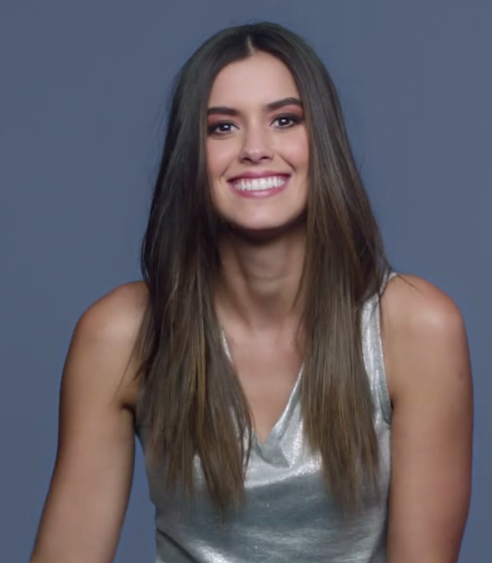
- Paulina Vega
- Date: 25 January 2015
- Presenters: Thomas Roberts; Natalie Morales; Jeannie Mai; Ariella Arida
- Entertainment: Prince Royce; Nick Jonas; Gavin DeGraw
- Venue: FIU Arena, Miami, Florida, United States
- Broadcaster: NBC; Telemundo
- Entrants: 88
- Placements: 15
- Withdrawals: Azerbaijan; Botswana; Denmark; Estonia; Namibia; Romania; Vietnam
- Returns: Albania; Egypt; Georgia; Ireland; Kenya; Kosovo; Portugal; Saint Lucia; Uruguay
- Winner: Paulina Vega; Colombia
- Congeniality: Queen Celestine, Nigeria
- Best National Costume: Elvira Devinamira, Indonesia
- Photogenic: Gabriela Berríos, Puerto Rico

Miss Universe 2014 was the 63rd Miss Universe pageant, held at the FIU Arena in Miami, Florida, United States, on 25 January 2015. This was the first time in the history of the competition that the pageant was not held during the year the title was awarded for. However, the pageant was still known as the 2014 pageant.

At the end of the event, Paulina Vega of Colombia won and succeeded Gabriela Isler of Venezuela, she was the second Colombian to win the Miss Universe title. The first runner-up was Nia Sanchez of the United States and the second runner-up was Constanza Baéz of Ecuador.

Contestants from eighty-eight countries and territories participated in this year's pageant. The pageant was hosted by Thomas Roberts and Natalie Morales, with Jeannie Mai as backstage correspondent. Prince Royce, Nick Jonas, and Gavin DeGraw performed in this year's pageant.

The competition also featured the debut of the new DIC Crown, which was composed of three hundred eleven diamonds, five pieces of blue topazes, one hundred ninety-eight pieces of blue sapphires, thirty-three pieces of heat—fired crystals, and two hundred twenty grams of 18k karat white gold. The crown was said to be worth $300,000.

== Background ==
=== Location and date ===
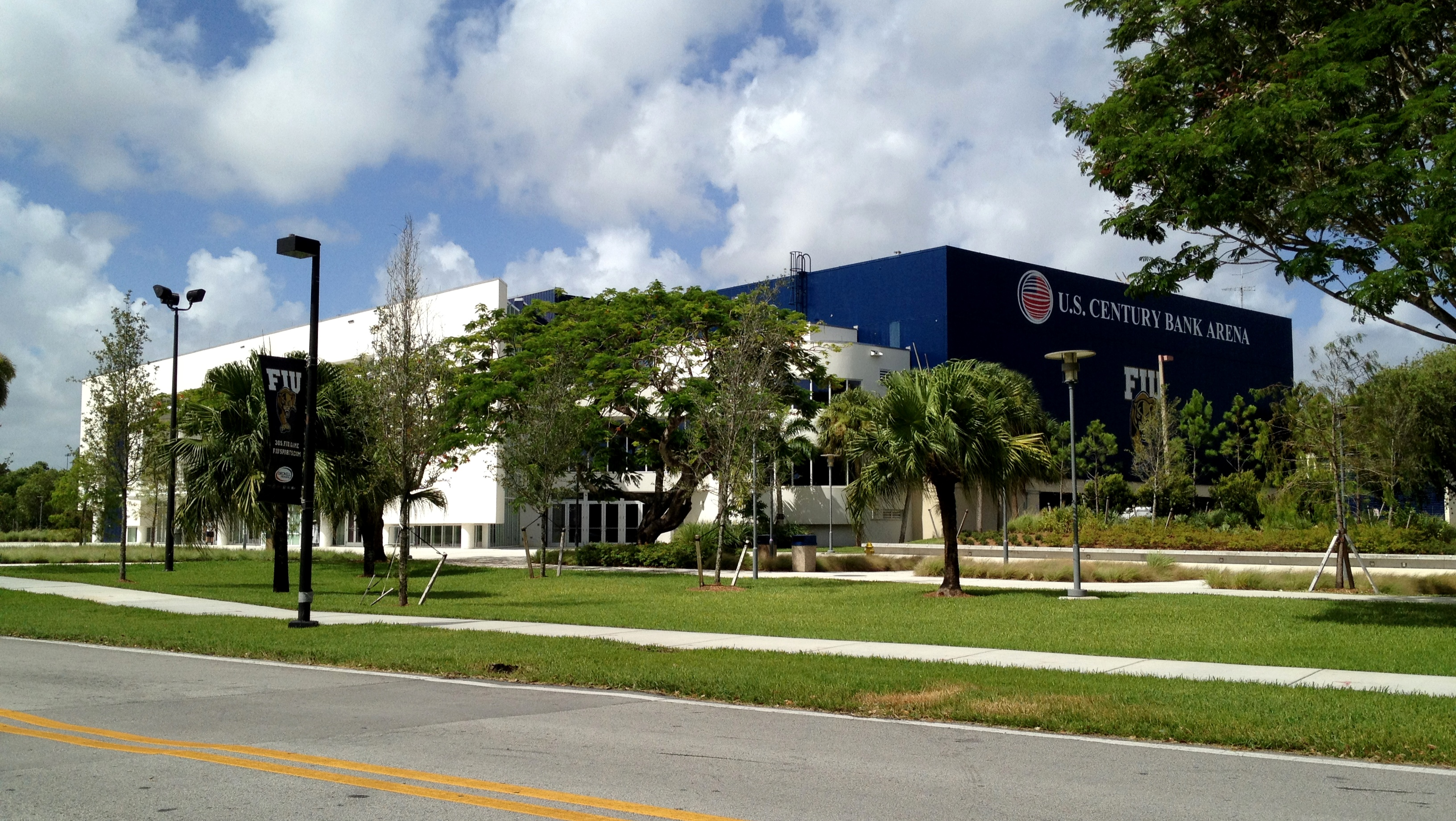
FIU Arena, Miami, Florida, United States the venue for Miss Universe 2014.

Negotiations between the Secretary of Tourism of Ceará in Brazil and the Miss Universe Organization began in late September 2013, when the Miss Universe Organization directors flew to Fortaleza to begin conversations and arrangement of pageant activities. Bismarck Maia, State Secretary of Tourism, disclosed the latest development to Fortaleza's market-leading newspaper, Diário do Nordeste, on 11 January 2014, announcing that the event will be at Centro de Eventos do Ceará, in Ceará's capital.

On 20 May 2014, Fortaleza's bid was formally retired, and the Miss Universe Organization was considering four other Brazilian cities as a replacement: Rio de Janeiro, Ribeirão Preto, Porto Alegre and Manaus.

On 22 August 2014, Donald Trump posted to Twitter that Miami and other cities were "fighting hard to host the Miss Universe pageant" and that an announcement would be made soon; specifically mentioning the city of Miami prompted many pageant watchers to believe that the pageant was headed for the Floridian city for the first time since 1997. On 9 September 2014, Puerto Rican newspaper, El Nuevo Dia, and Venezuelan newspaper, El Nacional, each printed an article that said that the contestants would be staying at a Trump-owned hotel in Miami; further fueling rumors that the pageant would be held in Miami in December.

On 12 September 2014, Luigi Boria, mayor of Doral, Florida, announced via Twitter that the pageant was going to take place in Doral on 18 January 2015, leading to some controversy among pageant fans. This was confirmed in late September. In early October, an announcement was released on the official website of Miss Universe stating that the pageant is will take place at the FIU Arena in Miami on 25 January 2015.

=== Selection of participants ===
Contestants from eighty-eight countries and territories were selected to compete in the competition. Six of these delegates were appointees to their national titles, while seven were selected to replace the original dethroned winner.

Camille Cerf, Miss France 2015, was appointed as Miss Universe France 2014 after Flora Coquerel, Miss France 2014, will only compete at Miss World 2014 due to the conflicting schedules of the two pageants. Coquerel competed in the pageant the following year. Marcela Chmielowska, the second runner-up of Miss Polonia 2011, was appointed as Miss Universe Poland 2014, due to the rescheduling of the Miss Polonia 2014 pageant in December 2014.

Laurence Langen, Miss Belgium 2014, was replaced by her first runner-up, Anissa Blondin, due to problems with the Miss Belgium Organization. Nora Xu, Miss Universe China 2014, originally was supposed to represent China at Miss Universe. However, Xu preferred to continue with her studies instead of competing in the pageant. Due to this, Hu Yanliang, first runner-up at Miss Universe China 2014, replaced Xu as Miss Universe China 2014. Arnela Zeković, first runner-up at Miss Serbia 2013, was replaced by Anđelka Tomašević as the representative of Serbia at Miss Universe for personal reasons. Carolyne Bernard, Miss Universe Tanzania 2014, originally was supposed to represent Tanzania at Miss Universe. However, Bernard withdrew after fracturing her feet in a car accident. Due to this, Nale Boniface, second runner-up of Miss Universe Tanzania 2014, replaced Bernard as the representative of Tanzania in Miss Universe.

Rolene Strauss, Miss South Africa 2014, was expected to compete at the Miss Universe and Miss World pageants. However, after winning Miss World 2014, Strauss was ineligible to compete for Miss Universe 2014. Ziphozakhe Zokufa, first runner-up of Miss South Africa 2014, replaced Strauss as the representative of South Africa in Miss Universe. Weluree Ditsayabut, Miss Universe Thailand 2014, was replaced by her first runner-up, Pimbongkod Chankaew, after calling for the supporters of the Prime Minister of Thailand to be executed. Diana Harkusha, second runner-up of Miss Ukraine Universe 2014, was appointed as the representative of Ukraine at Miss Universe after Anna Andres, Miss Ukraine Universe 2014, resigned for personal reasons.

The 2014 edition saw the returns of Albania, Egypt, Georgia, Ireland, Kenya, Kosovo, Portugal, Saint Lucia, and Uruguay. Kenya last competed in 2005, Egypt and Portugal last competed in 2011, while the others last competed in 2012. Azerbaijan, Botswana, Denmark, Estonia, Namibia, Romania, and Vietnam withdrew. Nguyễn Lâm Diễm Trang, the second runner-up of Miss Vietnam 2014, was appointed to represent Vietnam at Miss Universe but withdrew at the last minute due to lack of time to prepare for the pageant. Azerbaijan, Botswana, Denmark, Estonia, Namibia, and Romania withdrew after their respective organizations failed to hold a national competition or appoint a delegate.

== Results ==
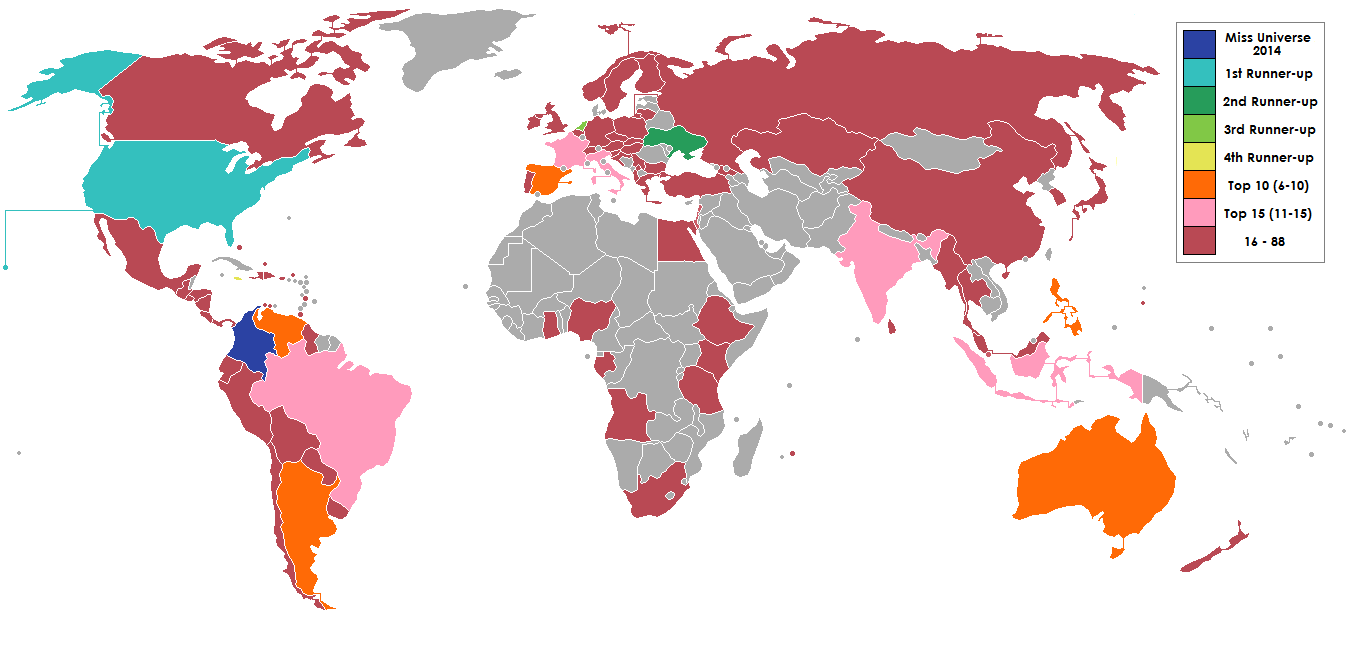
Miss Universe 2014 participating countries and territories.

=== Placements ===
Placement	Contestant
Miss Universe 2014	Colombia – Paulina Vega
1st Runner-Up	United States – Nia Sanchez
2nd Runner-Up	Ukraine – Diana Harkusha
3rd Runner-Up	Netherlands – Yasmin Verheijen
4th Runner-Up	Jamaica – Kaci Fennell
Top 10	Argentina – Valentina Ferrer; Australia – Tegan Martin; Philippines – Mary Jean Lastimosa; Spain – Desirée Cordero; Venezuela – Migbelis Castellanos
Top 15	Brazil – Melissa Gurgel; France – Camille Cerf; India – Noyonita Lodh; Indonesia – Elvira Devinamira; Italy – Valentina Bonariva

=== Special awards ===
Award	Contestant
Miss Congeniality	Nigeria – Queen Celestine
Miss Photogenic	Puerto Rico – Gabriela Berríos

==== Best National Costume ====
Final results	Contestant
Winner	Indonesia – Elvira Devinamira
Top 5	Argentina – Valentina Ferrer; Canada – Chanel Beckenlehner; Germany – Josefin Donat; India – Noyonita Lodh

== Pageant ==
=== Format ===
The Miss Universe Organization introduced several changes to the format for this edition. The number of semifinalists was reverted to fifteen— the same number of semifinalists in 2010. The results of the preliminary competition— which consisted of the swimsuit and evening gown competition, and the closed-door interview, determined the fifteen semifinalists. The fifteen semifinalists participated in the swimsuit competition, with ten advancing in the competition for the evening gown competition. From ten, five contestants will participate in the question and answer portion, and the final look.

=== Selection committee ===
==== Preliminary competition ====
- Lloyd Boston – Fashion guru, TV host and regular correspondent on NBC's The Today Show and CBS's The Insider
- Azucena Cierco – Latina actress, TV host and special correspondent at Telemundo, particularly her hosting stint at Un Nuevo Dia
- Jeneine Doucette-White – New York bureau manager at Access Hollywood
- Michelle McLean – Miss Universe 1992 from Namibia
- Jimmy Nguyen – Prominent entertainment and digital media lawyer, diversity advocate, blogger and technology adviser
- Corinne Nicolas – President of Trump Models Modelling Agency
- Tyler Tixier – Part of the sales team of Delta Air Lines, dubbed as the World's Best Airline

==== Final telecast ====
- Kristin Cavallari – American actress, TV personality, fashion designer
- William Levy – Cuban American model and actor, previously named People en Español's Sexiest Man Alive
- Manny Pacquiao – Filipino world champion professional boxer, Fighter of the Decade
- Louise Roe – English TV presenter, fashion journalist, host of MTV International's "Plain Jane", STAR World Asia's "Fit for Fashion"
- Lisa Vanderpump – Reality star of The Real Housewives of Beverly Hills
- Emilio Estefan – musician and producer
- DeSean Jackson – Washington Redskins wide receiver
- Nina Garcia – Creative Director of Marie Claire Magazine, Project Runway judge, and fashion industry expert
- Rob Dyrdek – Entrepreneur
- Giancarlo Stanton – Miami Marlins right fielder

== Contestants ==
Eighty-eight contestants competed for the title.

Country/Territory	Contestant	Age (Note: Ages at the time of the pageant)	Hometown
Albania	Zhaneta Byberi	19	Tirana
Angola	Zuleica Wilson	21	Cabinda
Argentina	Valentina Ferrer	22	Córdoba
Aruba	Digene Zimmerman	21	Oranjestad
Australia	Tegan Martin	23	Newcastle
Austria	Julia Furdea	20	Vienna
(The Bahamas) Bahamas	Tomii Culmer	24	Nassau
Belgium	Anissa Blondin	22	Brussels
Bolivia	Claudia Tavel	25	Santa Cruz
Brazil	Melissa Gurgel	20	Fortaleza
British Virgin Islands	Jaynene Jno Lewis	26	Tortola
Bulgaria	Kristina Georgieva	23	Sofia
Canada	Chanel Beckenlehner	27	Caledon
Chile	Hellen Toncio	20	Santiago
China	Hu Yanliang	24	Beijing
Colombia	Paulina Vega	22	Barranquilla
Costa Rica	Karina Ramos	21	San José
Croatia	Ivana Mišura	26	Zagreb
Curaçao	Laurien Angelista	27	Willemstad
Czech Republic	Gabriela Franková	21	Prague
Dominican Republic	Kimberly Castillo	26	Higüey
Ecuador	Alejandra Argudo	22	Portoviejo
Egypt	Lara Debbana	21	Cairo
El Salvador	Patricia Murillo	22	San Salvador
Ethiopia	Hiwot Mamo	24	Addis Ababa
Finland	Bea Toivonen	22	Helsinki
France	Camille Cerf	20	Coulogne
Gabon	Maggaly Nguema	22	Libreville
(Georgia (country)) Georgia	Ana Zubashvili	22	Tbilisi
Germany	Josefin Donat	21	Leipzig
Ghana	Abena Appiah	21	Accra
(United Kingdom) Great Britain	Grace Levy	25	London
Greece	Ismini Dafopoulou	26	Athens
Guam	Brittany Bell	27	Barrigada
Guatemala	Ana Luisa Montufar	21	Guatemala City
Guyana	Niketa Barker	24	Georgetown
Haiti	Christie Désir	25	Port-Au-Prince
Honduras	Gabriela Ordóñez	21	Comayagua
Hungary	Henrietta Kelemen	21	Budapest
India	Noyonita Lodh	21	Bangalore
Indonesia	Elvira Devinamira	21	Surabaya
(Republic of Ireland) Ireland	Lisa Madden	23	Cork
Israel	Doron Matalon	21	Beit Aryeh-Ofarim
Italy	Valentina Bonariva	25	Milan
Jamaica	Kaci Fennell	23	Kingston
Japan	Keiko Tsuji	21	Nagasaki
Kazakhstan	Aiday Issayeva	25	Almaty
Kenya	Gaylyne Ayugi	21	Nairobi
Kosovo	Artnesa Krasniqi	23	Pristina
Lebanon	Saly Greige	25	Bishmizzine
Lithuania	Patricija Belousova	19	Vilnius
Malaysia	Sabrina Beneett	24	Kuala Lumpur
Mauritius	Pallavi Gungaram	21	Vacoas-Phoenix
Mexico	Josselyn Garciglia	24	La Paz
Myanmar	Sharr Htut Eaindra	20	Yangon
Netherlands	Yasmin Verheijen	21	Amsterdam
New Zealand	Rachel Millns	24	Wellington
Nicaragua	Marline Barberena	27	Chichigalpa
Nigeria	Queen Celestine	22	Lagos
Norway	Elise Dalby	19	Hamar
Panama	Yomatzy Hazlewood	23	Panama City
Paraguay	Sally Jara	21	Asunción
Peru	Jimena Espinoza	26	Lima
Philippines	Mary Jean Lastimosa	27	Tulunan
Poland	Marcela Chmielowska	23	Warsaw
Portugal	Patrícia Da Silva	25	Lisbon
Puerto Rico	Gabriela Berríos	24	Toa Baja
Russia	Yulia Alipova	24	Balakovo
Saint Lucia	Roxanne Didier-Nicholas	23	Castries
Serbia	Anđelka Tomašević	21	Zubin Potok
Singapore	Rathi Menon	24	Singapore
Slovakia	Silvia Prochádzková	23	Bratislava
Slovenia	Urška Bračko	21	Maribor
South Africa	Ziphozakhe Zokufa	23	Cape Town
South Korea	Yoo Ye-bin	22	Daegu
Spain	Desirée Cordero	22	Seville
Sri Lanka	Avanti Marianne	25	Colombo
Sweden	Camilla Hansson	26	Stockholm
Switzerland	Zoé Metthez	21	Zurich
Tanzania	Nale Boniface	22	Dodoma
Thailand	Pimbongkod Chankaew	20	Bangkok
Trinidad and Tobago	Jevon King	26	Diego Martin
Turkey	Dilan Çiçek Deniz	20	Istanbul
Turks and Caicos Islands	Shanice Williams	22	Grand Turk Island
Ukraine	Diana Harkusha	20	Kharkiv
United States	Nia Sanchez	24	Las Vegas
Uruguay	Johana Riva	24	Montevideo
Venezuela	Migbelis Castellanos	19	Cabimas
