= Teeyapar Sretsirisuvarna =

Thai DJ and beauty pageant titleholder

- Born: Jirapha Kritshnasuvarna; 30 July 1992 (age 34); Bangkok, Thailand
- Height: 1.62 m (5 ft 4 in)
- Beauty pageant titleholder
- Title: Miss Earth Thailand 2019; Miss Earth Thailand 2020
- Hair color: Black
- Eye color: Brown
- Major competitions: Miss Universe Thailand 2014 (2nd Runner-up/Dethroned); Miss Asia 2018 (Top 11); Miss Earth 2019 (Top 20); Miss Earth 2020 (Top 20)

Teeyapar Sretsirisuvarna (Thai: ฏีญาภาร์ เศรษฐสิริสุวรรณ), nickname Petch (Thai: เพชร) (born 30 July 1992 in Bangkok) is a Thai DJ and beauty pageant titleholder who was crowned Miss Earth Thailand 2019. She represented Thailand at the Miss Earth 2019 and Miss Earth 2020 pageant and finally she was placed in Top 20.

== Early life ==
Teeyapar Sretsirisuvarna (old name:Jirapha Kritshnasuvarna, Sakolsupha Kritshnasuvarna, E-mikant Rachatachirachot and Sunannipar Kritshnasuvarna) was born in Bangkok, Thailand. She graduated from Business Administration of the North Bangkok University. Now she studying MBA for IT-Smart at Ramkhamhaeng University.

== Pageantry ==
=== Miss Universe Thailand 2014 ===
Sretsirisuvarna competed in Miss Universe Thailand 2014 and placed at 2nd runner up, but later she was dethroned because of her scandal.

=== Miss Earth Thailand 2019 ===
Sretsirisuvarna was appointed as Miss Earth Thailand 2019 by National Director of Miss Earth Thailand.

=== Miss Earth 2019 ===
Sretsirisuvarna was represent Thailand at Miss Earth 2019 pageant in Parañaque, Philippines on 26 October 2019 where she placed in the Top 20 and won Best Eco-Social Media Award. During Miss Earth 2019, She was part of the FIRE group together with more than 29 other candidates.

=== Miss Earth 2020 ===
Sretsirisuvarna represented Thailand at the Miss Earth 2020 pageant on 29 November 2020 where she placed in the Top 20 and competed with 83 other delegates from various countries which was held virtually due to restrictions caused by the COVID-19 pandemic. This is her second time competing in the said pageant after representing Thailand at Miss Earth 2019.

Awards and achievements
Preceded by (Amnat Charoen province) Nirada Chetsadapriyakun	Miss Earth Thailand; 2019-2020	Succeeded by (Chumphon province) Jareerat Petsom
