= Saddlebrook Academies =

Complex of sports schools in US

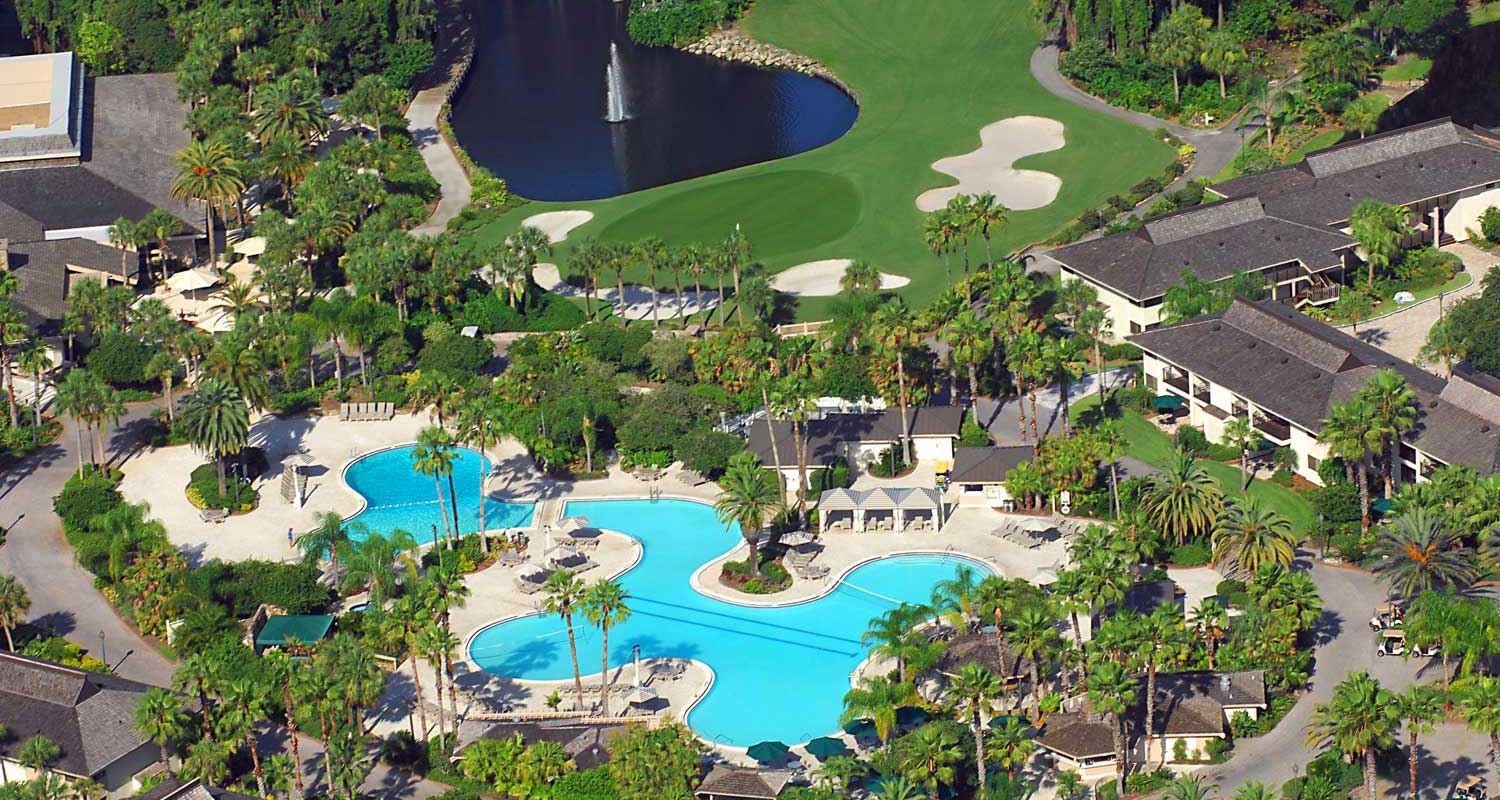
An aerial view of the Superpool, main building, and the 18th green of the Saddlebrook Course.

Saddlebrook Academies, located north of Tampa, Florida, United States in the Wesley Chapel community is a complex of sports schools, Saddlebrook Tennis Academy, Saddlebrook Golf Academy, and Saddlebrook Preparatory School. The academies are a part of Saddlebrook Resort.

== Founding ==
The Tampa Tennis Academy was acquired in 1986 from Harry Hopman, the former Australian player and coach who is the namesake for the Hopman Cup. The academy uses the resort's two tennis facilities, one in the Lakeside area of the property which is adjacent to the fitness centers, and the other in the Walking Village, adjacent to the resort’s main facilities.

Founded in 1993, Saddlebrook Prep was created to educate students attending the sports academies.

== Programs ==
=== Tennis ===
Instruction and play take place on the 45 clay, grass, and hard courts located on the Saddlebrook Resort property. The tennis program follows the Harry Hopman method of coaching.

==== Notable athletes trained in the tennis program ====
- Jim Courier - former ATP #1, four-time singles Grand Slam champion
- Pete Sampras - former ATP #1, 14-time singles Grand Slam champion, two-time Davis Cup champion
- John Isner - ATP professional, 2011 Hopman Cup champion, participated in the longest tennis match on record opposite Nicolas Mahut at Wimbledon in 2010
- James Blake - 2007 Davis Cup champion, two-time Hopman Cup champion, reached Bronze Medal match of the 2008 Olympics
- Martina Hingis - former WTA #1, five-time Grand Slam singles champion, twelve-time Grand Slam women's doubles champion, five-time Grand Slam mixed doubles champion, 2001 Hopman Cup champion, Silver Medal at the 2016 Olympics in women's doubles
- Justine Henin - former WTA #1, seven-time Grand Slam singles champion
- Caroline Wozniacki - former WTA #1, Australian Open singles champion
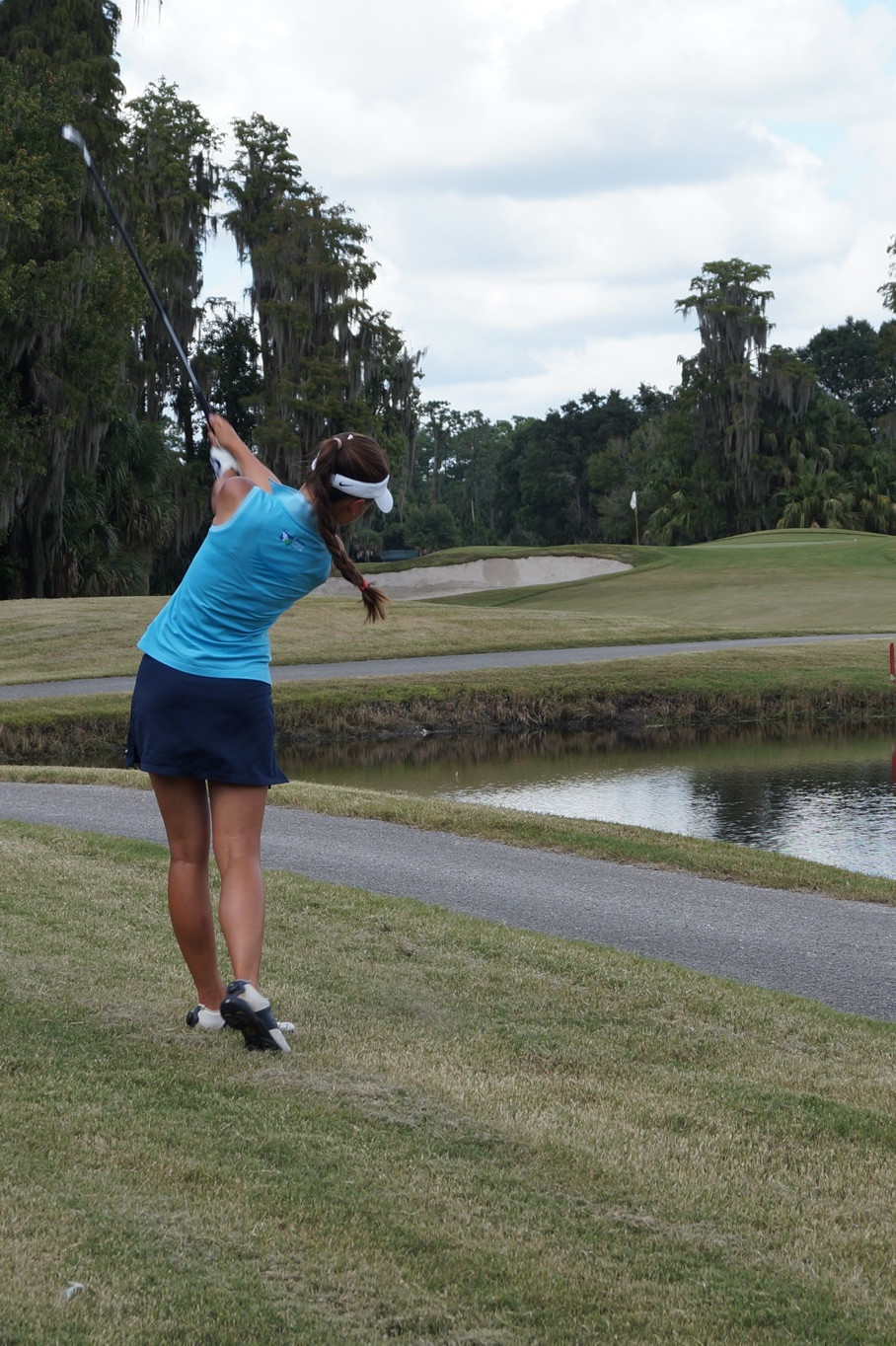
  A Saddlebrook Academy golfer plays one of Saddlebrook Resort's two courses.
- The Bryan Brothers - former ATP #1 team in men's doubles, 16-time Grand Slam doubles champions, Gold Medalists at the 2012 Olympics, combined for 11 Grand Slam mixed doubles titles
- Belinda Bencic - has reached the top ten in the WTA, coached by Martina Hingis. She was the Gold Medalist at the 2020 Olympics in Tokyo.
- Jack Sock - 2011 US Open mixed doubles champion, 2014 Wimbledon doubles champion, Gold Medalist in mixed doubles at the 2016 Olympics
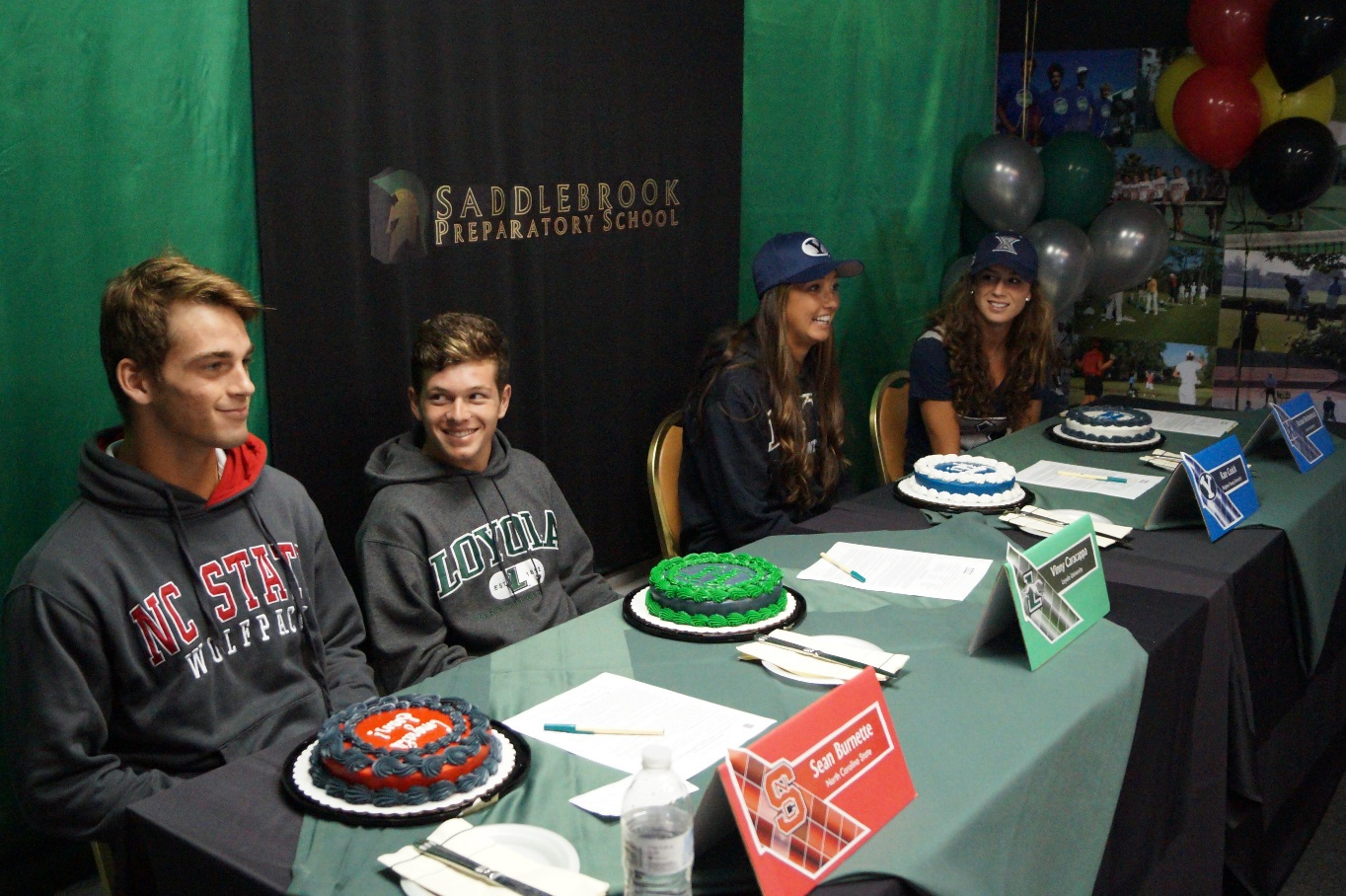
- Four students from Saddlebrook Prep's class of 2016 prepare to sign their National Letters of Intent.
  Alexander Zverev - ATP top 5, gold medalist at Tokyo 2020 in Men's Singles, two-time singles Grand Slam champion.
- Gabriela Dabrowski - Women's Doubles World #2 and 2023 and 2025 US Open Women's Doubles champion, and bronze medalist at Paris 2024 in Mixed Doubles.
- Luisa Stefani- Women's Doubles World #4, 2023 Australian Open Mixed Doubles champion, Panameican champion in Women's Doubles and bronze medalist at Tokyo 2020 in Women's Doubles.

=== Golf ===
The golf academy sits on a 16-acre parcel of Saddlebrook Resort and includes a training center, driving range, and chipping and putting greens. The Saddlebrook Resort also has two courses, the par-71 Palmer Course and the par-70 Saddlebrook Course.

=== Prep School ===
Saddlebrook Preparatory School was founded in 1993 as a part of the Pasco County School System (now an independent private school). The school is accredited through the Southern Association of Colleges and Schools Council on Accreditation and School Improvement (SACS-CASI), and the Florida Council of Independent Schools (FCIS). Saddlebrook Prep offers instruction for grades 3 through 12.

The student population is a mix of boarding and non-boarding students, representing six continents and more than 25 countries.

==== Alumni and former students ====
- Jennifer Capriati - former WTA #1, Gold Medalist at the 1992 Olympics, Australian and French Open champion
- Andy Roddick - former ATP #1, US Open champion
- Stephanie Nickitas - two-time NCAA Women's Tennis Team champion and two-time NCAA Women's Doubles champion at the University of Florida, former head coach of the UCF women's tennis team
- Mardy Fish - ATP professional, Silver Medalist at the 2004 Olympics, 2008 Hopman Cup Champion
- Prim Siripipat - anchor, correspondent, and radio host for ESPN
- Keegan Bradley - 2011 PGA Championship champion, 2011 PGA Rookie of the Year
- Young-A Yang - LPGA professional
- Paula Marti - LPGA professional
- Alex Domijan - four-time ITA All-American and the ITA National Freshman of the Year at the University of Virginia
- Ashnaa Rao - 2015 ITA Small College National Champion at Johns Hopkins University
- Luisa Stefani - Olympic medalist, 2016 ITA Rookie of the Year at Pepperdine University
- Gabriela Dabrowski - WTA top 5 in doubles, two-time Grand Slam mixed doubles champion
- Marc Spicijaric – #1 Ranked US Junior in Singles & Doubles (2003), reached NCAA ranking of 50
