= Ajahn Thoon Khippapañño =

Buddhist monk (1935–2008)

Phra Paññābisālathera (Thoon Khippapañño)

Personal life
- Born: Thoon Nonruecha; May 20, 1935 Udon Thani, Thailand
- Died: November 11, 2008 (aged 73) Udon Thani, Thailand

Religious life
- Religion: Buddhism
- Order: Dhammayuttika Nikaya
- Dharma name: Khippapañño

Venerable Acariya Thoon Khippapanyo (พระอาจารย์ทูล ขิปฺปปญโญ; May 20, 1935 – November 11, 2008), also known as "Luang Por Thoon", was born Thoon Nonruecha on Monday May 20, 1935, in the Chaiyawan District of Udon Thani. Venerable Acariya Thoon Khippapanyo was ordained at the age of 27 on July 27, 1961 with Acariya Dhammachedi (Joom Pantulo) as his preceptor.

In 1985, Venerable Acariya Thoon Khippapanyo built and established Wat Pa Ban Koh in Udon Thani, Thailand. In 2001, a majestic pagoda at Wat Pa Ban Koh was completed.

In 2002, Venerable Acariya Thoon Khippapanyo founded San Fran Dhammaram Temple in San Francisco.

On November 11, 2008, Venerable Acariya Thoon died from pneumonia complications and a lung tumor. His cremation ceremony was held January 31-February 2, 2009. Venerable Acariya Thoon was believed to be one of the rare arahant monks of our time by his followers.

Venerable Acariya Thoon Khippapanyo is known for his emphasis on wisdom and Sammaditthi (right view), the first step in the Noble Eightfold Path. During his lifetime, he gave many dhamma talks and wrote some notable letters to his followers. Venerable Acariya Thoon Khippapanyo authored an autobiography and over 20 texts, three of which have been translated into English.
