= San Fran Dhammaram Temple =

Coordinates: 37.764935°N 122.486799°W

The San Fran Dhammaram Temple is the only Thai Buddhist temple in the city of San Francisco.

== Congregation and ministry ==
There are over 600 worshipers in the congregation. Thai language classes for children and adults are offered. Monks who speak both English and Thai are available, including Phra Anandapanyo, a student of Venerable Acariya Thoon Khippapanyo, who grew up in San Francisco.

== History ==
San Fran Dhammaram Temple was established on June 24, 2002, by Venerable Acariya Thoon Khippapanyo.

The first location for San Fran Dhammaram Temple was on 11th Avenue in San Francisco. This location was provided by Ratima Chintanarod. This location first opened its doors on September 4, 2002, and the opening ceremonies were led by Acariya Thoon Khippapanyo and Praraj Wachirasophon.

In October 2008, a new location was purchased and renovations commenced. As part of the Dhammayuttika Nikaya, San Fran Dhammaram became the 50th temple belonging to the Dhammayut Order of the United States of America. In January 2009, renovations were completed and the temple was officially moved to 2645 Lincoln Way in San Francisco.
