= Prim Siripipat =

American tennis player (born 1981)

- Born: January 15, 1981 (age 45); Mexico, Missouri
- Education: Duke University

Prim Siripipat (Thai: พริม สิริพิพัฒน์; RTGS: Phrim Siriphiphat; born January 15) is an American former tennis player. She was previously a television anchor on ESPN. Siripipat was the co-host of "Spain and Prim" on ESPN Radio.

== Early years ==
Prim Siripipat was born in Mexico, Missouri to Ampai and Pallop Siripipat. By the age of 4, Siripipat had taken up dancing, swimming, gymnastics, and piano. At the age of seven, she began ballet and tennis. By the time she was 10, Siripipat was a skilled player in tennis. With the help of her mom, Siripipat, at the age of 12, moved to Tampa, Florida, to help elevate her skills. She attended Saddlebrook Preparatory School, where she was training with Jennifer Capriati, Andy Roddick, Martina Hingis and Mardy Fish. She traveled the world with the U.S. National team and eventually finished in the top 10 in the country for players aged 18 and under. She attended Duke University on a full scholarship. The Duke Blue Devils Tennis team was ranked top 10 and won the Indoor National Championship her senior year. However, Siripipat had been suffering through injuries over the year of playing tennis. By time she was 17, Siripipat had two stress fractures in her back. In her junior year, Siripipat underwent surgery on her shoulder and both knees. It became clear that Siripipat could no longer pursue a career as a tennis player.

== Career ==
Siripipat majored in sociology with a minor in biological anthropology and anatomy during her four years at Duke University. After getting her degree, Siripipat received a job as an intern for WRAL-TV. In 2004, she was among several thousand contestants trying out for the show Dream Job which was aired by ESPN. In 2007, she received a job at CBS-4 in Miami as a sports reporter. In March, 2011, Siripipat received a job as an anchor at ESPN. She also appeared as a tennis analyst and made several appearances on ESPN radio. She was laid off from ESPN in 2017.

Siripipat returned to tennis to pursue a pro career. Afterwards, she joined The Athletic, hosting her podcast The Next Chapter with Prim Siripipat.

== Personal life ==
During an ESPN interview, Siripipat revealed her musical talents, playing the piano, clarinet and saxophone. In 2016, she became engaged to Ben Michael Aronson. They married in March 2017.
