= Weluree Ditsayabut =

Thai drag queen (born 1992)

- เวฬุรีย์ ดิษยบุตร
- Born: 6 February 1992 (age 34); Tha Muang, Kanchanaburi, Thailand
- Other name: Fai (ฝ้าย)
- Height: 1.70 m (5 ft 7 in)
- Beauty pageant titleholder
- Title: Miss Universe Thailand 2014
- Hair color: Brown
- Eye color: Brown
- Major competitions: Miss Universe Thailand 2014 (Winner; Resigned)

Weluree Ditsayabut (Thai: เวฬุรีย์ ดิษยบุตร; RTGS: Weluri Ditsayabut), nickname Fai (Thai: ฝ้าย) (born February 6, 1992, in Tha Muang, Kanchanaburi) is a Thai beauty queen who held the Miss Universe Thailand 2014 and was about to represent her country at Miss Universe 2014 until her resignation on 9 June.

== Early life ==
Weluree was born in Tha Muang, Kanchanaburi on February 6, 1992. She graduated from Visuttharangsi School in Kanchanaburi and she studied Faculty of Humanities, Kasetsart University.

== Pageantry ==
=== Miss Universe Thailand 2014 ===
Weluree was crowned Miss Universe Thailand 2014 represented Kanchanaburi on May 17, 2014, at Royal Paragon Hall, Siam Paragon in Bangkok, beating early bookie's favorite Pimbongkod Chankaew who finished 1st Runner-up in this event.

=== Resignation ===
Weluree was to represent Thailand in Miss Universe 2014, but resigned from her title on 9 June due to conflict with Thailand's prime minister.

== Filmography ==
=== Television ===
Year	Title	Role	Network
2014	Room Alone 401-410	Cake	ONE 31
2014	Ruen Rissaya	Sri	Channel 3
2015	Mong Kut Ritsaya	Fah-Rung Nuikam (Fah)	Channel 8
2016	Nang Barb	Leelayut	ONE 31
2017	Chaloei Seuk	Fuengfah	Channel 8
2018	Sanae Nang Kruan	Ngam Ta	Channel 8
2019	Majurat Holiday	Nidnoi / Chidchanok	Channel 8
2019	Preng Lap Lae	Niracha / Nia	Channel 8
2019	Leh Runjuan	Srijun	Channel 8
2020	Pbop Phee Jao	Wong-Waen	Channel 8
2021	Reuan Rom Ngiw	Rampoie	Channel 8
2023	Tanaosri	Princess Usawadee (Cameo)	Channel 8
20	Phitsawat Kham Phop		Channel 8
20	Winyan Patsaya		Channel 8

Awards and achievements
Preceded by Chalita Yaemwannang	Miss Universe Thailand; 2014 (Resigned)	Succeeded by Aniporn Chalermburanawong
