= Miss Universe Thailand 2013 =

14th Miss Universe Thailand pageant

- Date: 11 May 2013
- Presenters: Kanit Sarasin, Elizabeth Sadler Leenanuchai
- Entertainment: Singto Numchok, The Lucky Band, Napat Injaiuea, Tanatat Chaiyaat, Jaruwat Cheawaram, Wichayanee Pearklin, Pawida Morigi, Delilian Alford
- Venue: Royal Paragon Hall, Siam Paragon, Bangkok, Thailand
- Broadcaster: Channel 5
- Entrants: 44
- Placements: 12
- Winner: Chalita Yaemwannang; Bangkok

Miss Universe Thailand 2013, the 14th Miss Universe Thailand pageant, was held at the Royal Paragon Hall, Siam Paragon in Bangkok on 11 May 2013. The contestants will camp in Krabi. before flying back to Bangkok for the final stage. Farida Waller, Miss Universe Thailand 2012, was crowned her successor Chalita Yaemwannang from Bangkok at the end of this event.

In the final round, broadcast live on Channel 5. Chalita Yaemwannang, was crowned Miss Universe Thailand 2013 by Nutpimon Nattayalak, Miss Universe Thailand 2012.

The winner is Chalita Yaemwannang represented for Thailand at the Miss Universe 2013 pageant. This year, 1st Runner-up Chonthica Tiengtham went to represent Thailand at Miss International 2013 instead of Miss Earth 2013 because Miss Universe Thailand Organization lost the license of the Miss Earth pageant.

== Results ==
=== Placements ===
Placement	Contestant
Miss Universe Thailand 2013	Bangkok – Chalita Yaemwannang
1st Runner-Up	Chonburi – Chonthicha Tiengtham
2nd Runners-Up	Bangkok – Sakaowan Singhapreecha; Bangkok – Sunitporn Srisuwan; Chiang Mai – Wanvisa Prapasirivichaikul
Top 12	Bangkok – Wannapaluck Boonsakulcharoen; Chiang Mai – Khaneporn Intamoon; Chiang Mai – Wantanee Fakkaew; Krabi – Tanaporn Kachapon; Nan – Darawan Chantala; Nan – Tanisa Punyapoo; Phetchaburi – Sarita Khantho
