= Chalita Yaemwannang =

Thai model

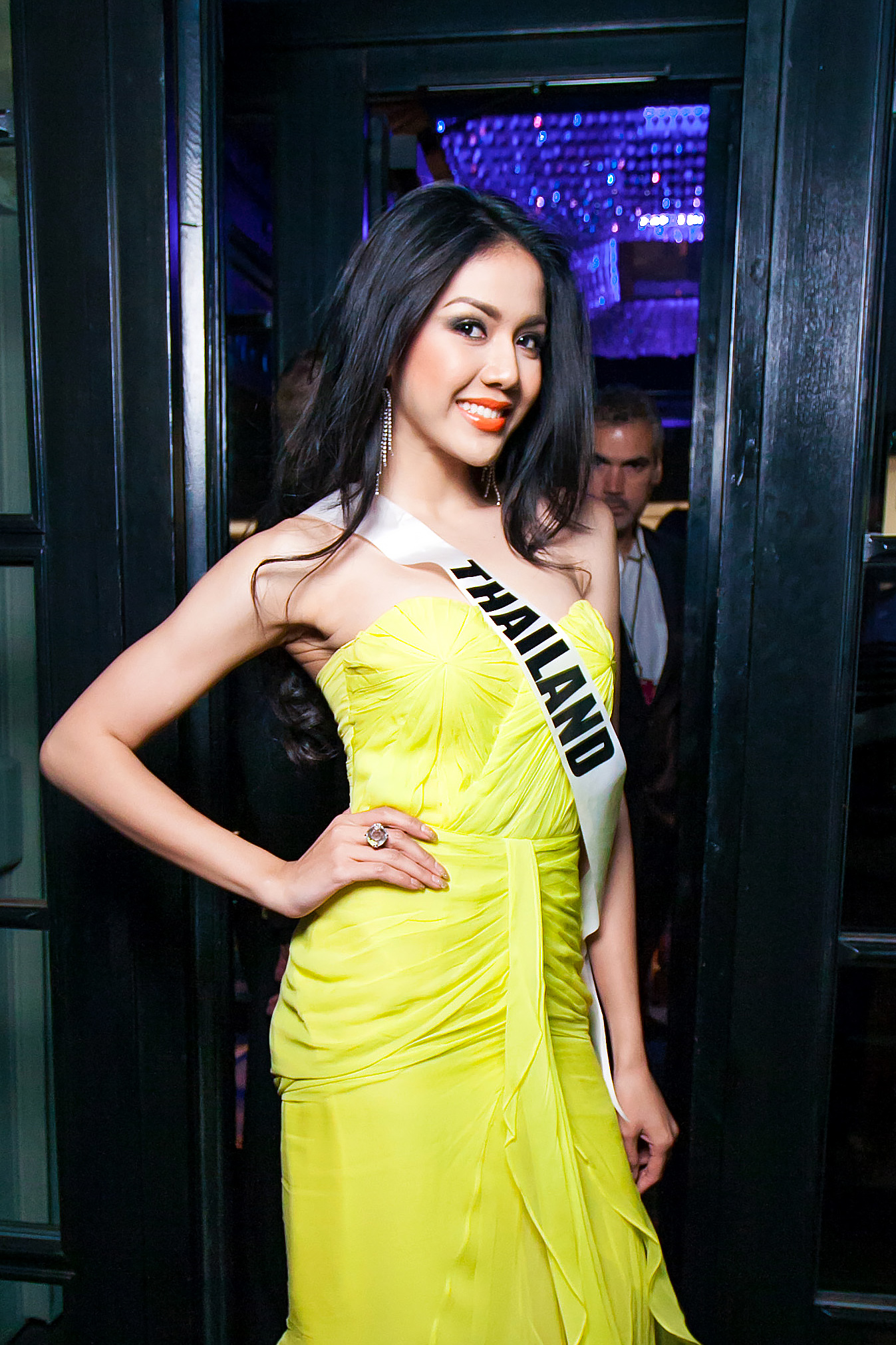
- Born: Chalita Yaemwannang; 21 April 1988 (age 38); Bangkok, Thailand
- Height: 1.78 m (5 ft 10 in)
- Beauty pageant titleholder
- Title: Miss Universe Thailand 2013
- Hair color: Black
- Major competitions: Miss Nakhon Ratchasima 2007 (Winner); Miss Universe Thailand 2013 (Winner); Miss Universe 2013 (Unplaced)

Chalita Yaemwannang (Thai: ชาลิตา แย้มวัณณังค์), nickname Lita (Thai: ลิต้า) (born 21 April 1988 in Bangkok) is a Thai beauty pageant titleholder who won Miss Universe Thailand 2013 and represented her country at Miss Universe 2013.

== Early life ==
Yaemwannang was born in Bangkok on 21 April 1988. She grew up in Nakhon Ratchasima and attended Management Technology (Entrepreneurial Management) at Suranaree University of Technology. She holds a master's degree in Tourism Management and Marketing from Bournemouth University, United Kingdom and a PhD in English Language Studies from Suranaree University of Technology.

== Miss Universe Thailand 2013 ==
Chalita Yaemwannang won the title of Miss Universe Thailand 2013 on Saturday 11 May 2013 at Royal Paragon Hall, Siam Paragon, succeeding outgoing champion Nutpimon Farida Waller Miss Universe Thailand 2012. Chalita will receive a cash prize 1,000,000฿ (one million baht), Sprinkling Rains Crown and jewelry set from Beauty Gems, the new Toyota Prius cars and other prizes a total of over 4,000,000฿ (four million baht), she was then a guest judge in New Zealand. She represented Thailand at Miss Universe 2013 but failed to make the semifinals.

Awards and achievements
Preceded by Farida Waller	Miss Universe Thailand; 2013	Succeeded by Weluree Ditsayabut (Resigned)
Preceded by Farida Waller	Thailand representatives at Miss Universe; 2013	Succeeded by Allison Sansom
