= List of Marathi Buddhists =

This is a list of Mahars notable persons of the Marathi Buddhist community worldwide. Marathi Buddhists are mainly Ambedkarite Buddhists, who are followers of B. R. Ambedkar. Marathi Buddhists constitute more than 77% of the total Buddhist population in India.

== Academics ==
- Narendra Jadhav, economist, educationist and author
- Shankarrao Kharat, Vice Chancellor of BAMU Aurangabad
- Prof Dr Adv Sunil Baliram Gaikwad , Author, Editor, educationist,
- Bhalchandra Mungekar, economist and author
- Sharmila Rege, sociologist, feminist scholar and author of Writing Caste, Gender
- Anand Teltumbde, scholar, writer and civil rights activist
- Sukhadeo Thorat, economist and author

== Businesspeople ==
- Milind Kamble, national president of Dalit Indian Chamber of Commerce and Industry
- Dr Sunil Baliram Gaikwad, Founder Bhimalaya Ayurveda Pvt ltd
- Kalpana Saroj (born 1961), entrepreneur and a Tedx speaker

== Entertainers ==
- Sambhaji Bhagat, Singer, Shahir
- Siddharth Jadhav, actor
- Bhalchandra Kadam, actor, comedian
- Pandharinath Kamble, actor and comedian
- Abhijeet Kosambi, singer
- Vaishali Made, singer
- Adarsh Shinde, singer and musician
- Prahlad Shinde, singer
- Vitthal Umap, singer
- Somnath Waghmare, documentary filmmaker and researcher

== Lawyers ==
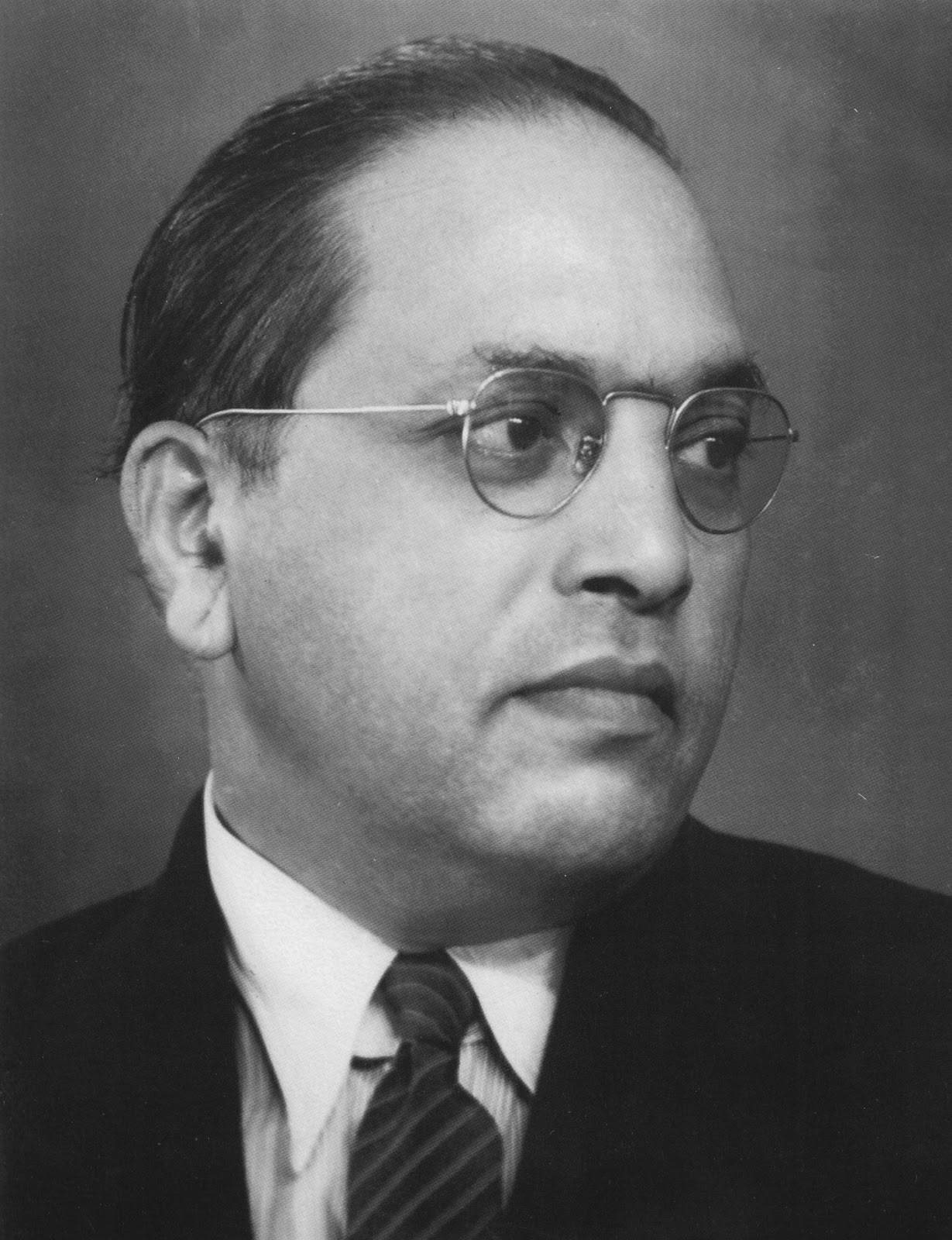
B. R. Ambedkar, Marathi scholar and the revivalist of Buddhism in India

- B. R. Ambedkar (1891–1956), jurist, barrister, and first Law and Justice Minister of India
- Ramchandra Dhondiba Bhandare (born 1916), Governor of Bihar and Andhra Pradesh
- B. R. Gavai (born 1960), 52nd Chief Justice of India
- B. C. Kamble (born 1919), jurist and lawyer
- Prof. Dr.Adv.Sunil Baliram Gaikwad (born 19 June 1970) Advocate Supreme Court of India

== Politicians ==
- Anandraj Ambedkar, political activist
- Prakash Yashwant Ambedkar, MP
- Yashwant Ambedkar, MLC
- Ramdas Athawale, MP and state minister of India
- Pritamkumar Shegaonkar, state minister of Maharashtra
- Rajkumar Badole, MLA and Social Justice and Assistance Minister, Maharashtra
- Sanjay Bansode, state minister of Maharashtra
- Sharad Bansode, Member of Parliament
- Murlidhar Chandrakant Bhandare, Governor of Odisha
- Ramchandra Dhondiba Bhandare, Governor of Bihar and Andhra Pradesh
- Bhaurao Gaikwad, Member of Parliament
- Eknath Gaikwad, MP and state minister
- Sunil Gaikwad, Member of Parliament
- Varsha Gaikwad, Member of Parliament (Former School Education Cabinet Minister of Maharashtra)
- Prakash Gajbhiye, Member of MLC
- R. S. Gavai, Governor of Bihar And Kerala, Member of the parliament, Former Chairman of Maharashtra Legislative Council
- Rajendra Gavai, political activist
- Chandrakant Handore, state minister of Maharashtra
- Ramratan Janorkar, Mayor of Nagpur
- N. M. Kamble, Indian politician
- Jogendra Kawade, cabinet minister, and Member of the Maharashtra Legislative Assembly
- B. D. Khobragade, Deputy Chairman of the Rajya Sabha
- Sulekha Kumbhare, minister
- Avinash Mahatekar, State Minister of Maharashtra
- Laxman Mane, political activist
- Waman Meshram, President Of Bahujan Kranti Morcha
- Nitin Raut, cabinet minister and MLA
- Dadasaheb Rupwate, politician
- Tukaram Shrangare, Union Minister For State For Communications
- Sudhakar Tukaram Shrangare, Member of Parliament
- Nashikrao Tirpude, 1st Deputy Chief Minister of Maharashtra
- Balkrishna Ramchandra Wasnik, Member of Parliament for Bhandara and Buldhana
- Mukul Wasnik, Minister for Social Justice and Empowerment
- Abhijeet Dipke Indian political communication strategist and founder of the political satire movement Cockroach Janta Party

== Sportspeople ==
- Mona Meshram, Cricketer
- Avinash Sable, Athlete
- Pravin Tambe, Cricketer
- Malvika Bansodbadminton player

== Writers and activists ==
- Savita Ambedkar (1909–2003), social activist and writer
- Baburao Bagul, writer and poet
- Dr Sunil Baliram Gaikwad, Social activist and writer
- Datta Bhagat, author
- Suresh Bhat (1932–2003), poet
- Raja Dhale (1940–2019), social activist and writer
- Namdeo Dhasal (1949 2014), social activist and writer
- Laxman Gaikwad, novelist
- Arun Kamble, writer and social activist
- Namdeo Kamble, writer, social worker, journalist and teacher
- Uttam Kamble, journalist and author
- Vaman Kardak, poet and playwright
- Shankarrao Kharat, writer and member of the Maharashtra Legislative Council
- Sharankumar Limbale, author
- Yashwant Manohar, poet and writer
- Keshav Meshram, poet
- Bhau Panchbhai, Poet, Writer and Activist
- Gangadhar Pantawane, Writer, Reviewer and Ambedkarite thinker
- Dagdu Maruti Pawar, Writer and Poet
- Pradnya Daya Pawar, Poet and Fiction Writer
- Urmila Pawar, Writer and Activist
- Sampat Ramteke, Social Worker

== See also ==
- List of Buddhists
- Marathi Buddhists
- List of converts to Buddhism
- List of American Buddhists
