= List of British Buddhists =

This is a list of notable Buddhists or Buddhist practitioners who live or lived in the United Kingdom. This list includes both formal teachers of Buddhism, and people notable in other areas who are publicly Buddhist or who have espoused Buddhism in the United Kingdom.

== Actors ==
- Adewale Akinnuoye-Agbaje (born 1967), British-Nigerian actor (Soka Gakkai International)
- Andrew Williams, British actor, model and television personality.
- Alex Day (born 1989), English musician, vlogger and writer.
- Alex Ferns (born 1968), Scottish actor known for EastEnders.
- Barry Letts (1925–2009), English actor, television director, writer and producer.
- Benedict Cumberbatch (born 1976), British actor (Theravada).
- Chris Gascoyne (born 1968), English actor (Theravada)
- David Yip, British actor and playwright.
- Donovan, British singer, songwriter and record producer.
- Gordon Hopkirk (1884–1966), British silent film actor.
- James Norton, English actor (Tibetan Buddhism)
- John Garrie (1923–1998), British actor and Zen Buddhist teacher.
- Pierce Brosnan, Irish actor.
- Orlando Bloom (born 1977), English actor (Soka Gakkai International)
- William Woollard, British actor, historian and retired television producer and television presenter.
- Zhang Tielin (born 1957), British actor and film director.

== Actresses ==
- Anulka Dziubinska, English actress and model.
- Claudia Jessie, British actress (Soka Gakkai International)
- Emma Watson, British actress and model.
- Jan Anderson, British actress and television personality.
- Lauren Harries, English actress and television personality.
- Naomi Watts, British-Australian actress.
- Nikki Bedi, British actress and television personality.
- Pamela Nomvete, British actress.
- Thandiwe Newton (born 1972), English actress (Theravada).
- Rula Lenska, British actress.

== Artists ==
- Jeff Banks, Welsh artist, fashion designer of men's and women's clothing, jewellery, and home furnishings.

== Business ==
- Andy Puddicombe (born 23 September 1972) is a British author, public speaker and a teacher of meditation and mindfulness. He, alongside Richard Pierson, is the co-founder of Headspace, a digital health company that provides guided meditation training and mindfulness for its users.
- Clare Melford, British businesswoman and former CEO of Global Disinformation Index.

== Politics ==
- Eric Lubbock, 4th Baron Avebury (1928–2016), English politician; served as the Liberal Member of Parliament for Orpington and served in the House of Lords, having inherited the title of Baron Avebury in 1971.(Secular Buddhism)
- Suella Braverman is a British barrister and politician who has served as Home Secretary since 25 October 2022. She previously held the position from 6 September to 19 October 2022 under Liz Truss. A member of the Conservative Party, she was chair of the European Research Group from 2017 to 2018 and Attorney General for England and Wales from 2020 to 2022. She has been the member of Parliament (MP) for Fareham in Hampshire since 2015. She took her oath of office on the Dhammapada.

== Science ==
- Bernard Benson, British inventor and author.
- Edmund James Mills, British chemist. He was inventor of the brand-name disinfectant Parozone.

== Singers ==
- Amazonica, is a British rock singer and DJ.
- Annabella Lwin (born 31 October 1966) is an Anglo-Burmese singer, songwriter and record producer best known as the lead vocalist of Bow Wow Wow.
- Boy George (born 1961), English singer, songwriter, DJ, fashion designer, mixed media artist, photographer and record producer (Soka Gakkai International).
- Gary Glitter, English former glam rock singer, became a Buddhist and vegetarian during the 1980s.
- Howard Jones (born 1955), English musician, singer and songwriter.
- Jamie Muir, British musician, best known for his work as the percussionist in King Crimson from 1972 to 1973, appearing prominently on their fifth album Larks' Tongues in Aspic.
- Limahl, English pop singer, lead singer of Kajagoogoo and solo artist.
- Maxi Jazz (born 1957), British rapper.
- Nick Jago, English musician, former drummer of Black Rebel Motorcycle Club.
- Richard Batsford (born 25 October 1969), English pianist, composer and singer-songwriter.
- Sandie Shaw (born 26 February 1947), retired English pop singer.
- Martin Taylor (born 20 October 1956), Guitarist/Composer

== Sports ==
- Andy B, British professional poker player.
- Alex Albon, British racing driver who competes under the Thai flag in Formula One for Williams.
- Jonny Wilkinson (born 1979), English former rugby union player. (Thravada)
- Russell Martin, professional football manager and former player who was most recently the head coach of Scottish Premiership club Rangers.
- Ricky Evans (born 1960), Welsh former international rugby union player.
- Peter Thornley (born 19 October 1941) is an English retired professional wrestler who was best known for the ring character Kendo Nagasaki.

== Military ==
- Arthur Lillie (24 February 1831 – 28 November 1911), was a Buddhist, soldier in the British Indian Army, and a writer. His books on religion were poorly received by scholars.
- Neville Armstrong (20 October 1913 – September 2008) was a British soldier, literary agent, and publisher.

== Mountaineers ==
- Edward Douglas Fawcett, British mountaineer, philosopher and novelist.
- Marco Pallis, Greek-British author and mountaineer with close affiliations to the Traditionalist School. He wrote works on the religion and culture of Tibet.
- Colin Wyatt, British ski-racer, ski-jumper, ski mountaineer, artist, lepidopterist, author, and photographer; world traveller.

== Monastics and Religious Teachers ==
- Ajahn Amaro (born 1956) – British-American Theravāda monk; abbot of Amaravati Buddhist Monastery in England.
- Ajahn Brahm (born 1951) – British-born Theravāda monk, ordained in Thailand; abbot of Bodhinyana Monastery in Australia.
- Ajahn Khemadhammo (born 1944) – British monk of the Thai Forest Tradition; founder of Forest Hermitage, UK.
- Ajahn Sucitto (born 1949) – British-born Theravada Buddhist monk, former abbot of Chithurst Buddhist Monastery.
- Charles Henry Allan Bennett (1872–1923) – Theravāda monk and occultist
- Ñāṇamoli Bhikkhu (1905–1960) – British Theravada Buddhist monk and translator of Pali literature.
- Ñāṇavīra Thera (1920–1965) – English Theravāda Buddhist monk.
- Sīlācāra (1871–1951) – One of the earliest Western Theravāda monks, ordained in Burma.
- Sangharakshita (1925–2018) – British Buddhist teacher; founder of the Triratna Buddhist Community.

== Writers, Poets, and Teachers ==
- Ananda Metteyya (1872–1923) – One of the first English monks ordained in Burma; early missionary.
- Christmas Humphreys (1901–1983) – Founder of The Buddhist Society in London; early British convert.
- Ken Jones (1930–2015) – Welsh teacher, poet, and socially engaged Buddhist activist.
- Lance Selwyn Cousins (1942–2015) – British scholar in the field of Buddhist Studies and founding member of Samatha Trust.
- Maitreyabandhu (born 1961) – Poet and Buddhist teacher at the London Buddhist Centre.
- Rupert Mark Lovell Gethin (born 1957) – Emeritus Professor of Buddhist Studies at the University of Bristol.
- Thomas William Rhys Davids (1843–1922) – Welsh scholar of the Pāli language and founder of the Pāli Text Society.

== See also ==
- Jewish Buddhists
- List of American Buddhists
- List of Marathi Buddhists
- List of converts to Buddhism
- List of converts to Buddhism from Christianity
- Outline of Buddhism
- Buddhism in the United Kingdom
- List of Buddhists
