= Julia Cheek =

American businesswoman

Julia Cheek is the CEO and Founder of Everly Health, which consists of Everlywell and more recent acquisitions like PWNHealth and Home Access Health Corporation. Cheek is also a Headspace board member.

== Career ==
Cheek founded Everly Health in 2015. She appeared on Shark Tank in 2018 and in 2023 it was announced that Everlywell was the second highest revenue company in Shark Tank history. Cheek was named to Forbes' richest self-made women's list, valuing her net worth at $260 million.
