= Springwater Center =

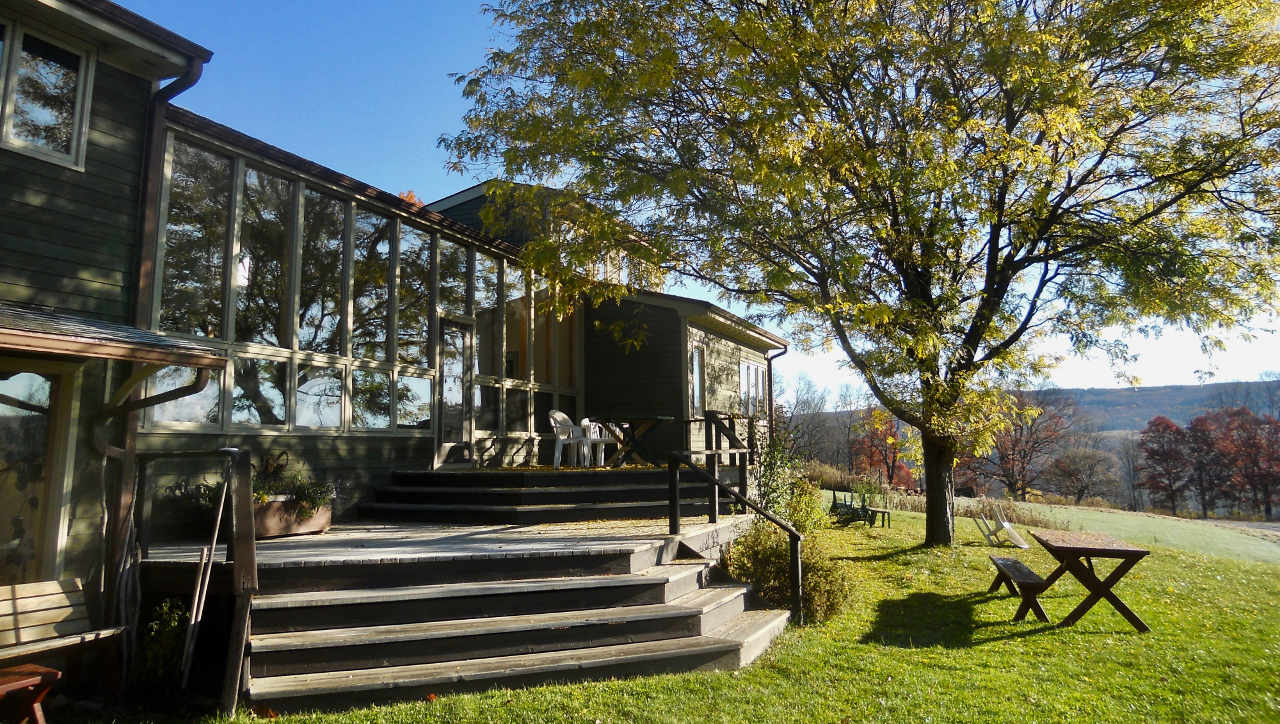

Religion
- Affiliation: Non-denominational

Location
- Location: 7179 Mill Street EXT Springwater, New York 14560

Website
- www.springwatercenter.org

Springwater Center is a retreat center located in Springwater, New York. Founded by Toni Packer in 1981, Springwater Center is located in the Finger Lakes region of the upper state, an hour south of Rochester. It was originally named the Genesee Valley Zen Center, but the name was changed to Springwater Center as Packer moved increasingly away from the traditional and dogmatic practices of formal Zen training.

Springwater Center is a 12,000-square-foot (1,100 m^{2}) building located on 200 acres of land that includes rolling hills, a rushing stream, miles of hiking trails, hardwood forests, and a pond. The center hosts 14 shared guest rooms, and a meditation hall that can accommodate forty-five guests. There is a dining room, library, exercise room, sauna, and solarium. Springwater Center is operated by full-time staff.

Springwater Center is a (501)(c)(3) non-profit organization, and retreats, membership dues, and donations are tax-deductible.

== Silent Meditation Retreats ==
There are numerous retreats scheduled throughout the year, as well as Saturday sittings and quiet weeks. Retreats were formerly led by Toni Packer, and are currently led by those she asked to carry on her work. There are opportunities for individual meetings with the facilitating teacher, group dialogue meetings, and individual meetings between retreat participants. Non-hierarchical forms of dialogue allow participants to share and inquire into their experiences on an equal footing. This approach contrasts the hierarchical and solitary retreat form, whereby the participant only interacts with a designated authority.

Meditative inquiry is a common term heard at Springwater Center during silent retreats. While the term is difficult to strictly define, it is often understood as a subtle state of mind that is open and receptive to wondering and questioning in a state of not knowing.
