= Toni Packer =

German-American Budist teacher (1927–2013)

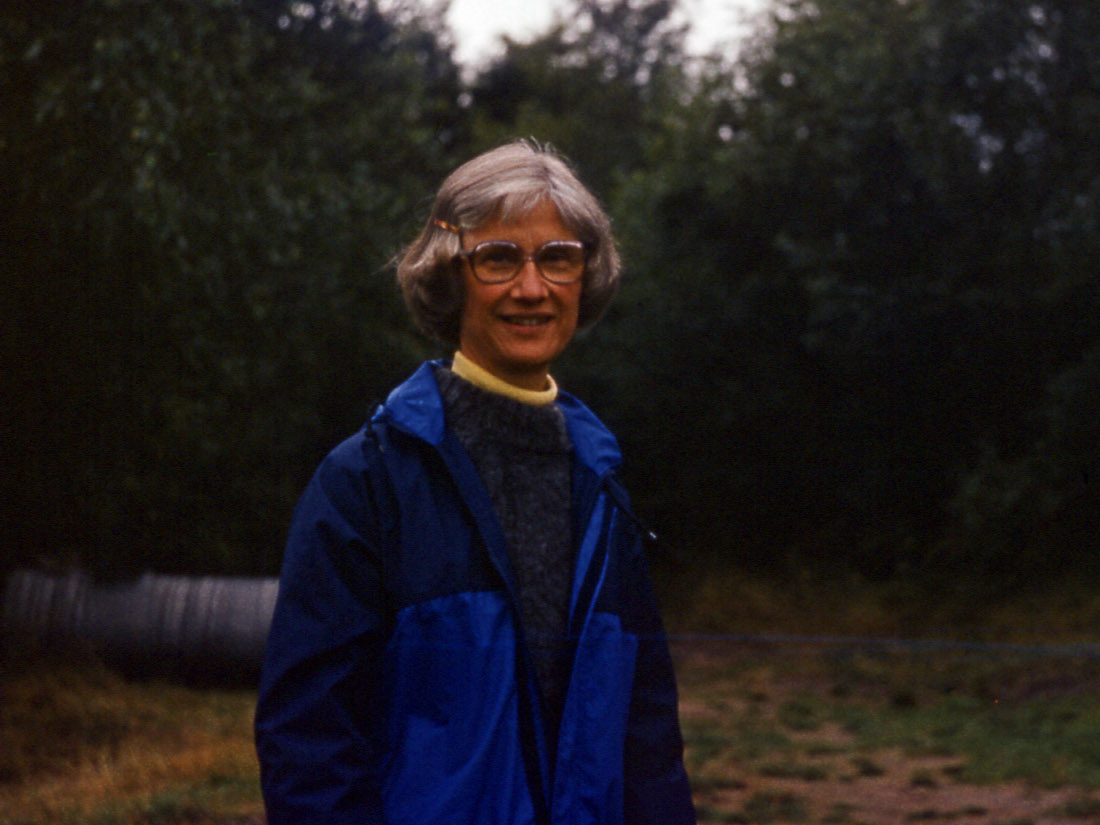
- Packer (1978)
- Born: July 1927; Berlin, Germany
- Died: 23 August 2013 aged 86; Mount Morris, New York, U.S.
- Known for: Meditative inquiry
- Spouse: Kyle Packer

Toni Packer (April 1927 – August 23, 2013) was a German-American teacher of “meditative inquiry”, and the founder of Springwater Center. Packer was a former student in the Sanbo Kyodan lineage of Zen Buddhism, and was previously in line to be the successor of Phillip Kapleau at the Rochester Zen Center.

== Biography ==
Toni Packer was born in Berlin, Germany in 1927. Her family was Lutheran in name only, as they endeavored not to divulge the fact that her mother was of Jewish descent. It was in her childhood, growing up amidst the turmoil of Nazi Germany, that Packer first developed mistrust for authority. The family eventually made a move to Switzerland, where she married her husband Kyle Packer in 1950. The pair moved to New York near the State University of New York at Buffalo, where Kyle came to earn a degree in psychology. Toni began reading the pioneering works about Zen Buddhism by Alan Watts, D. T. Suzuki and Philip Kapleau. It was the last which had the greatest impact on her, and she soon joined the nearby Rochester Zen Center with her husband.

Throughout the 1970s she accepted minor teaching positions at Rochester, and in 1981 she ran the center for an extended period in Kapleau's absence. During this time she instituted many changes in the practice there; for example, she discontinued wearing the abbreviated Buddhist robe called a rakusu, worn in some Japanese Zen circles to distinguish more advanced practitioners.

In 1980, Toni visited Kapleau in Mexico, where he was on a sabbatical while she ran the Zen Center. According to Kapleau's assistant, who was present at the meeting, Toni had “reached a point where she felt she could no longer practice in a Buddhist context.” When Toni's decision to no longer practice at the Center was announced to the Zen membership (sangha), there was a period of dismay and even acrimony—more so among individual members than between Kapleau and Toni, However, several years after Toni left the Zen Center, Kapleau visited the Springwater Center that Toni and her group had established. About two decades later, Toni was invited to speak by phone with Kapleau as he was dying.

In 1981 she founded the Genesee Valley Zen Center, in Rochester, New York. In 1986 the center relocated and changed its name, dropping the word Zen to become the Springwater Center for Meditative Inquiry and Retreats in Springwater, New York. The Springwater Center is incorporated under New York State law as a religious institution.

Packer has rejected labels for herself such as a teacher or authority, though some of the individuals she has asked to carry on her work do not. (Note: as evidenced on the Springwater Center web site) The word "Zen" was dropped from the Center's name as a result of Packer's move away from Japanese Zen Buddhist traditions.

== Teaching style ==
Her discussion of meditative inquiry is informed largely by her own vision, but also by the talks and writings of J. Krishnamurti.

Up to sixteen retreats are held a year, giving a blend of ritual-less silent retreats and David Bohm style dialogues/group meetings.

Packer has been described as ". . . a Zen teacher minus the 'Zen' and minus the 'teacher,'" emphasizing the importance of meditative inquiry without practicing Buddhism. Though stripped of rituals, Packer still found the practice of zazen to be useful.

== Bibliography ==
- Packer, T (1990). The Work of This Moment. Shambhala Publications. ISBN 0-87773-536-0.
- Packer, T (1995). The Light of Discovery. Charles E. Tuttle. ISBN 0-8048-3063-0.
- Packer, T (1995). Seeing Without Knowing & What Is Meditative Inquiry?. Springwater Center. OCLC 35850237.
- Packer, T (2002). The Wonder of Presence and the Way of Meditative Inquiry. Shambhala Publications. ISBN 1-57062-875-0.
- Packer, T (2007). The Silent Question: Meditating in the Stillness of Not-Knowing. Shambhala Publications. ISBN 978-1-59030-410-5.

== See also ==
- Jiddu Krishnamurti
- David Bohm
- Buddhism in the United States
- Buddhism in the West
- Timeline of Zen Buddhism in the United States
- Advaita Vedanta
