= List of American Buddhists =

This is a list of notable Buddhists in the United States.

== Academia ==
- Dennis Hirota is a professor in the Department of Shin Buddhism at Ryukoku University in Kyoto, Japan. He was born in Berkeley, California in 1946 and received his B.A. from University of California, Berkeley. In 2008, he was a visiting professor of Buddhism at Harvard Divinity School where his studies focused on the Buddhist monk Shinran.
- Taitetsu Unno was a scholar, lecturer, and author on the subject of Pure Land Buddhism. His work as a translator has been responsible for making many important Buddhist texts available to the English-speaking world and he is considered one of the leading authorities in the United States on Shin Buddhism, a branch of Pure Land Buddhism.

== Actors ==
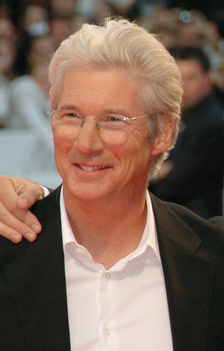
Richard Gere
- Anthony Lee (1961–2000), American actor and playwright
- Benedict Cumberbatch (born in 1976) is an American-British Buddhist actor. He is famous for Dr. Strange (2021), The Imitation Game (2014) and Spider-man: No Way Home (2021).(Theravada).
- Celeste Lecesne, American actor, author, screenwriter, LGBT rights activist, founder of The Trevor Project
- Chris Kattan, American actor, comedian and author. (Tibetan Buddhism)
- David Labrava, actor, writer, tattoo artist, former member of the Hells Angels, and motorcycle enthusiast best known for playing Happy Lowman in the FX series Sons of Anarchy and its spinoff Mayans M.C. (Zen)
- Drew Carey, American actor, comedian, game show host and photographer.(Theravada)
- Duncan Trusell (1974– ), American actor and stand-up comic, known for his podcast The Duncan Trussell Family Hour. (Tibetan Buddhism)
- Garry Shandling (1949–2016), American actor and comedian. (Zen)
- George Takei, American actor and author
- Haing S. Ngor, American actor. He won the Academy Award for Best Supporting Actor for his portrayal of Cambodian-American journalist Dith Pran in the biographical drama film The Killing Fields (1984).
- Herschel Savage, American actor, director, and stage actor.
- Jeremy Piven, American actor, comedian and producer. (zen)
- Jet Li, American-Chinese martial artist, actor (Tibetan Buddhist)
- John Astin – , American actor best known for playing Gomez Addams on The Addams Family
- Ke Huy Quan, American actor. His accolades include an Academy Award, a Golden Globe Award, and a Saturn Award, in addition to a BAFTA nomination.
- KevJumba (June 12, 1990– ), American former YouTuber and actor.
- Mandy Patinkin (1952– ), American actor and singer, known for his work in musical theatre, television and film.
- Martin Starr (1983– ), American actor and comedian.
- Michael O'Keefe, American actor, known for his roles as Danny Noonan in Caddyshack, Ben Meechum in The Great Santini, for which he received a nomination for the Academy Award for Best Supporting Actor, and Darryl Palmer in the Neil Simon movie The Slugger's Wife.He has been a practicing Zen Buddhist since 1981.
- Michael Imperioli (1966– ), American actor, writer, director and musician. In 2008, Imperioli became a Buddhist.
- Mort Thompson (1920–2000), American actor and stunt performer (Nichiren Buddhism)
- Pattrick Duffy (1949– ), American actor and director widely known for his role on the CBS primetime soap opera Dallas, where he played Bobby Ewing, the youngest son of Miss Ellie, and the nicest brother of J.R. Ewing from 1978 to 1985 and from 1986 to 1991. The actor was brought closer to the teachings of Buddhism by his late wife, the ballet dancer Carlyn Rosser (1939–2017). He has now been practicing religion for almost 50 years and describes it as an "Essential part" of his life.
- Peter Coyote (1941– ), American actor and author (Zen, ordained priest)
- Pierce Brosnan, Irish-American actor who played the lead role in four James Bond films from 1995 to 2002.
- Richard Machowicz, was a Navy SEAL and the host of the Discovery Channel and Military Channel show Future Weapons. He was the newest member on Spike's show Deadliest Warrior.
- Richard Gere, American actor. He began in films in the 1970s, playing a supporting role in Looking for Mr. Goodbar (1977) and a starring role in Days of Heaven (1978). (Tibetan Buddhism)
- Ron Glass (1945–2016), American actor and comedian.
- Steven Seagal, American actor and aikido expert (Tibetan Buddhism)
- Walter Ho (1923 – March 27, 2020), known in Chinese as Hua Da (when he was in China) and Hsia Hua-ta (when he was in Taiwan), was an American Peking opera actor.

== Actresses ==
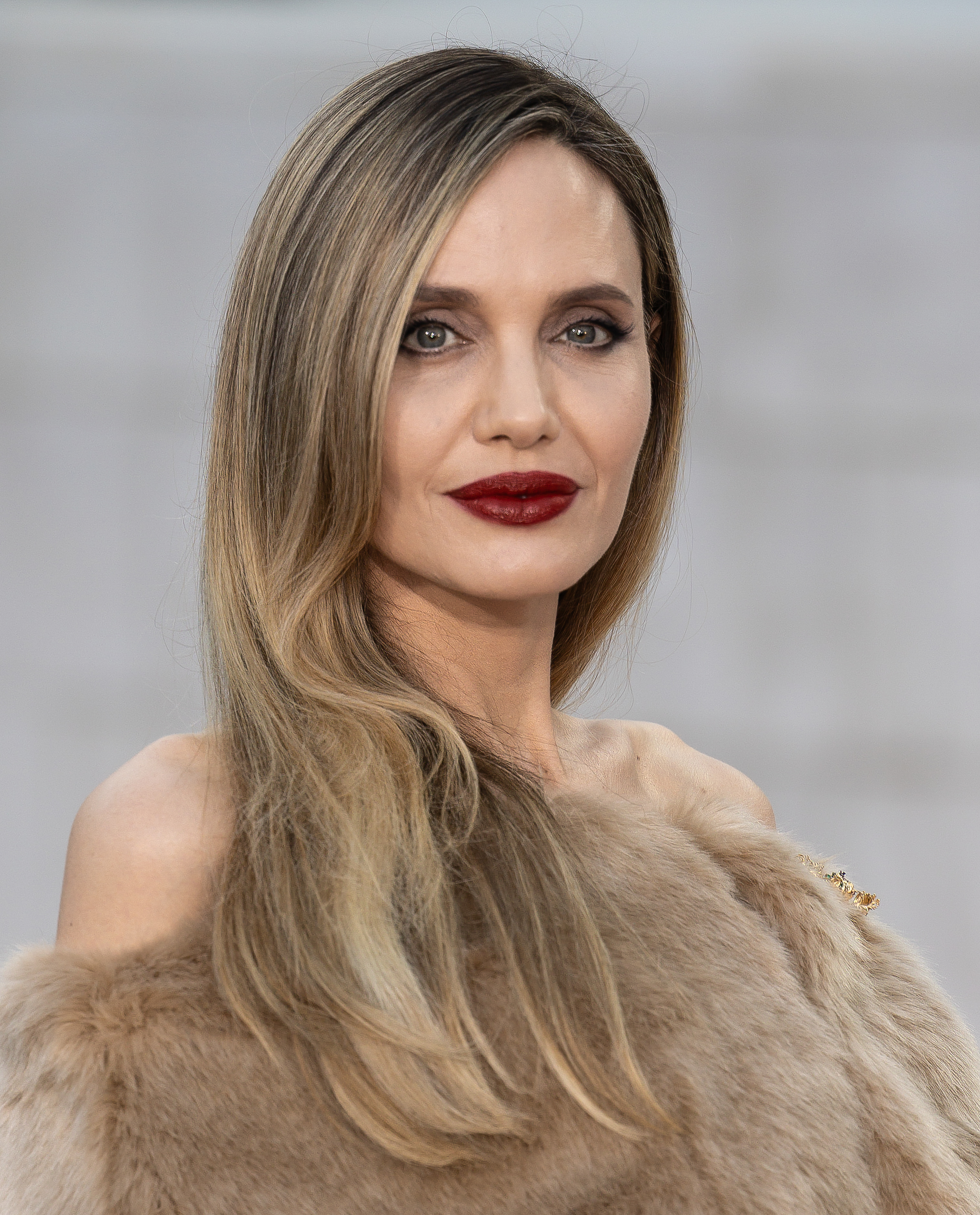
Angelina Jolie

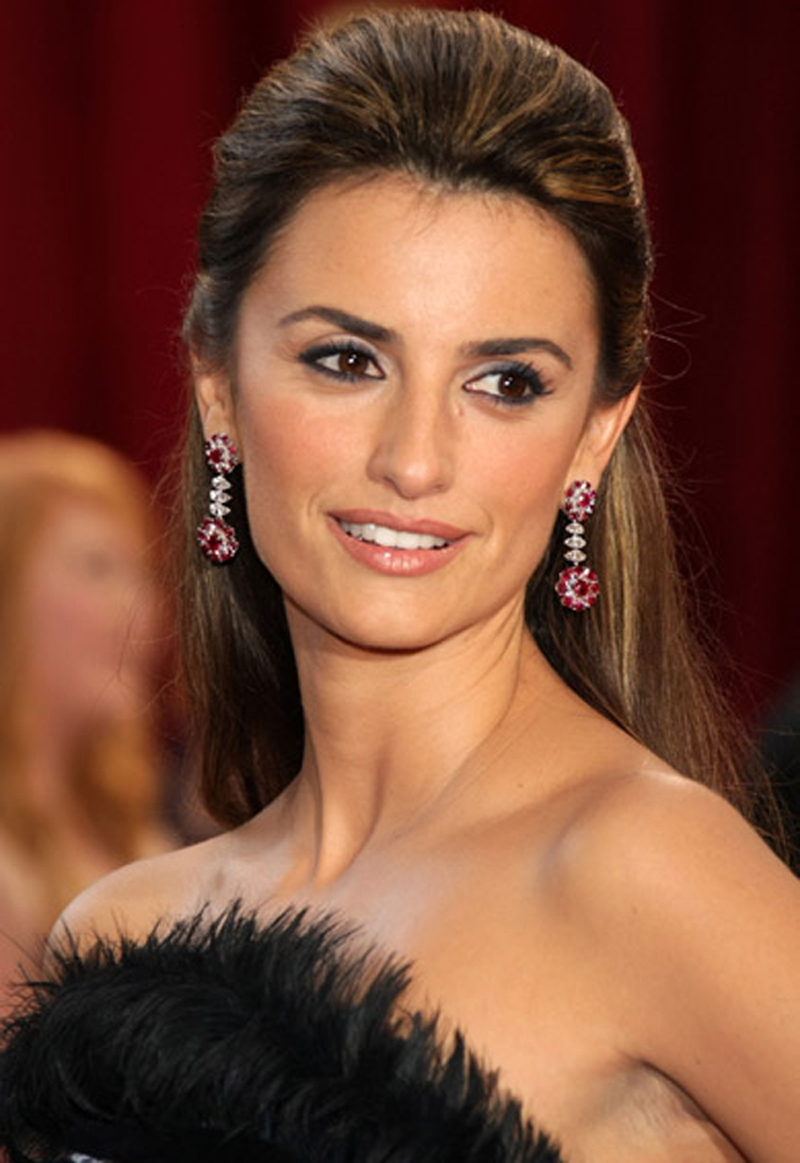
Penélope Cruz

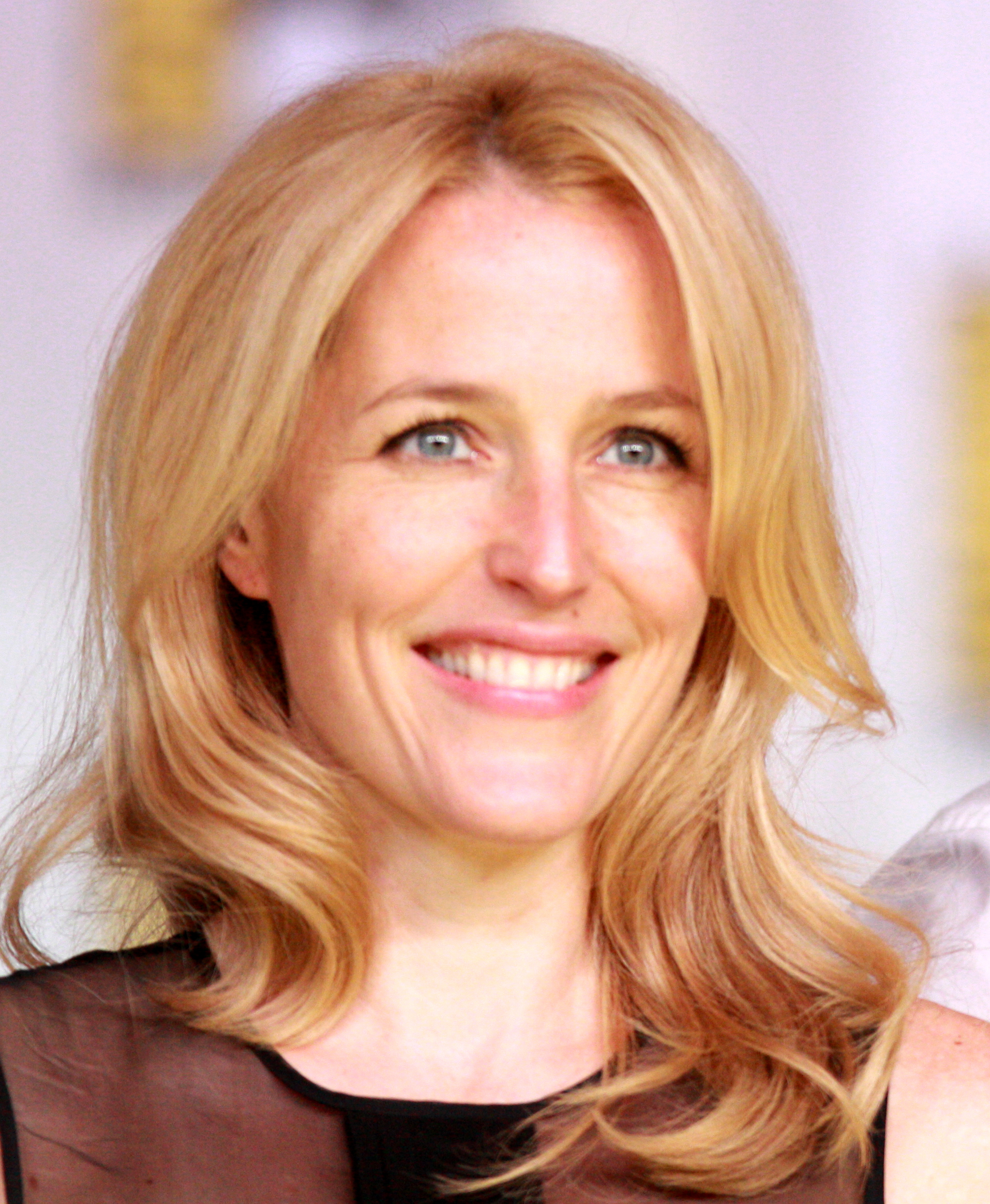
Gillian Anderson
- Angelina Jolie, American actress, filmmaker, and humanitarian. The recipient of numerous accolades, including an Academy Award and three Golden Globe Awards, she has been named Hollywood's highest-paid actress multiple times.
- Angelica Ross (1980– ), American actress, businesswoman, and transgender rights advocate and computer programmer, she went on to become founder and CEO of TransTech Social Enterprises, a firm that helps employ transgender people in the tech industry.
- Brittney Palmer, American actress, businesswoman, and model. She converted to Buddhism in 2025.
- Chantal Thuy, Canadian American actress known for her role as Grace Choi in Black Lightning.
- Edie Falco (July 5, 1963– ), American actress. She is best known for her roles as Carmela Soprano on the HBO series The Sopranos (1999–2007), and as Nurse Jackie Peyton on the Showtime series Nurse Jackie (2009–2015). She also played Diane Whittlesey in HBO's prison drama Oz (1997–2000).
- Emily Donahoe, American actress, producer and model.
- Goldie Hawn, American actress, producer, dancer, and singer. She has received several awards including an Academy Award and a Golden Globe Award as well as nominations for a BAFTA Award and two Primetime Emmy Awards.
- Gillian Anderson, American television personality, best known for her appearance in The X-Files.
- Holly Madison, American television personality, best known for her appearance in the reality television show The Girls Next Door.
- Jennifer Beals, Flashdance (1983), for which she won NAACP Image Award for Outstanding Actress in a Motion Picture and was nominated for the Golden Globe Award for Best Actress – Motion Picture Comedy or Musical.
- Kate Bosworth, American actress and model. Following minor roles in the films The Horse Whisperer (1998) and Remember the Titans (2000), she rose to prominence with her role as a young surfer in the box-office hit Blue Crush (2002).
- Kiều Chinh (born in Hanoi 1937), Vietnamese-American actress, producer, humanitarian, lecturer and philanthropist.
- Kate Hudson (1979– ), American actress and businesswoman.(Zen)
- Koo Stark (1956– ), American photographer and actress, known for her relationship with Prince Andrew. She is a patron of the Julia Margaret Cameron Trust, museum of the Victorian pioneer photographer.
- Lindsay Crouse, American actress and producer.
- Luana Anders (1938–1996), American film and television actress and screenwriter.
- Lucy Liu (December 2, 1968– ), American actress, producer, director, and artist. Her accolades include winning a Critics' Choice Television Award, two Screen Actors Guild Awards and a Seoul International Drama Award, in addition to nominations for a Primetime Emmy Award.
- Maggie Q, American actress and producer.
- Malin Akerman (1978– ), Swedish-American raised in Canada, actress, producer and model.
- Marcia Wallace, American actress, voice artist, comedian
- Ming-Na Wen (November 20, 1963– ) is an American actress and model. She is best known for voicing Mulan in the animated film Mulan and its sequel, and for portraying Melinda May / The Cavalry in Marvel's Agents of S.H.I.E.L.D. (2013–2020). She was named TVLine's Performer of the Week for her work in the episode, "Melinda".
- Naima Mora, actress, fashion model and winner of America's Next Top Model
- Penélope Cruz, Spanish-American actress who won an Academy Award, BAFTA Award, a David di Donatello and three Goya Awards.
- Susan Damante, American actress who has starred in various films and television programs.
- Rei Hance, American writer, businesswoman, and retired actress.
- Vinessa Shaw, American film actress and model. She was raised a Buddhist. She embraced Nichiren Buddhist philosophy as a member of the Soka Gakkai International.

== Art ==
- Alex Grey, American visual artist, author, teacher, and Vajrayana practitioner known for his 21-painting Sacred Mirrors series.
- Chrisann Brennan, American artist and painter.
- Paul Reps (September 15, 1895 – July 12, 1990), American artist, poet, and author. He is best known for his unorthodox haiku-inspired poetry that was published from 1939 onwards. He is considered one of America's first haiku poets.
- Elaine Hamilton-O'Neal (October 13, 1920 – March 15, 2010), professionally known as Elaine Hamilton, was an internationally known American abstract painter and muralist born near Catonsville, Maryland.

== Business ==
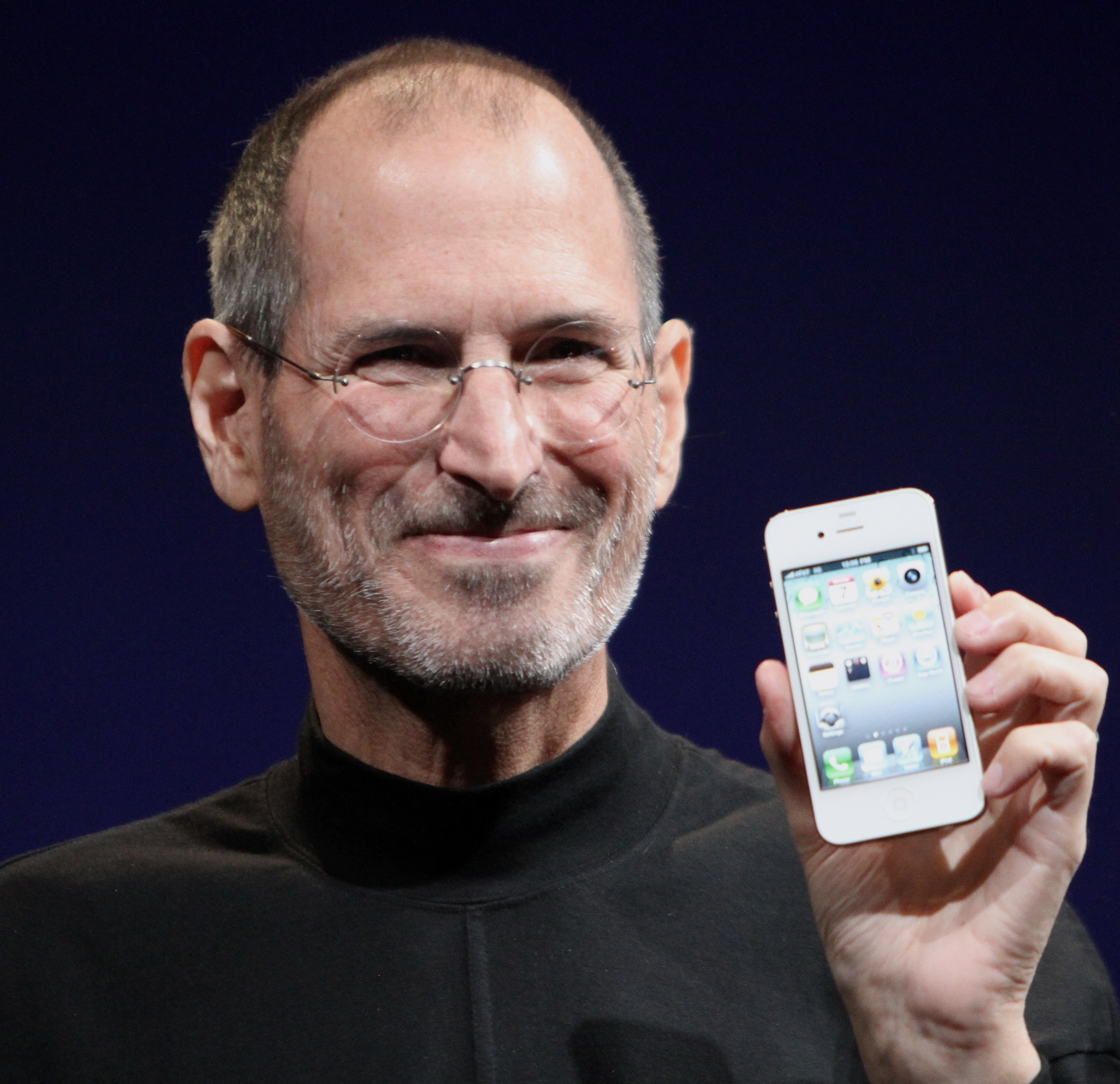
Steve Jobs

- George Dvorsky, Transhumanist, Futurist and a director of Humanity+ (Secular Buddhism)
- Jack Dorsey (1976– ), American technological entrepreneur and philanthropist who is the co-founder and former CEO of Twitter, as well as the founder and CEO of Block, Inc., a financial payments company. (Theravada)
- Linda Pritzker, American lama in the Tibetan Buddhist tradition. She is a spiritual teacher, author, philanthropist, and co-founder of the Namchak Foundation and Namchak Retreat Ranch.
- Nita Ing (born 17 March 1955, in Taipei) is the Taiwanese-American president of Continental Engineering Corporation and the former chairman of the board of the Taiwan High Speed Rail Corporation, the company which built a high-speed railway system from Taipei to Kaohsiung. A supporter of the Democratic Progressive Party, she had been an advisor to the former President Chen Shui-bian.
- Pierre Omidyar, French technology entrepreneur, software engineer, and the founder of eBay.
- Priscilla Chan (February 24, 1985– ), American philanthropist and a former pediatrician. She and her husband, Mark Zuckerberg, a co-founder and CEO of Meta Platforms, established the Chan Zuckerberg Initiative in December 2015, with a pledge to transfer 99 percent of their Facebook shares, then valued at $45 billion.
- Steve Jobs, American businessman, entrepreneur, marketer, inventor and the CEO of Apple Inc (Zen)
- Steve Wynn, American real estate developer and art collector. He was known for his involvement in the luxury casino and hotel industry, prior to being forced to step down.

== Directors ==
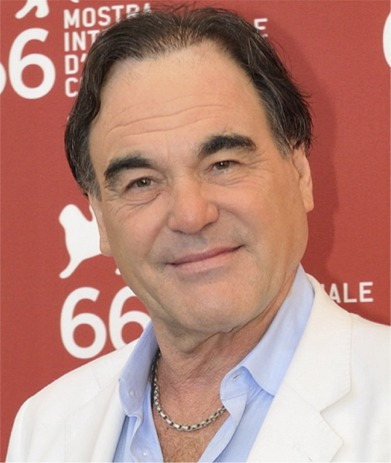
Oliver Stone

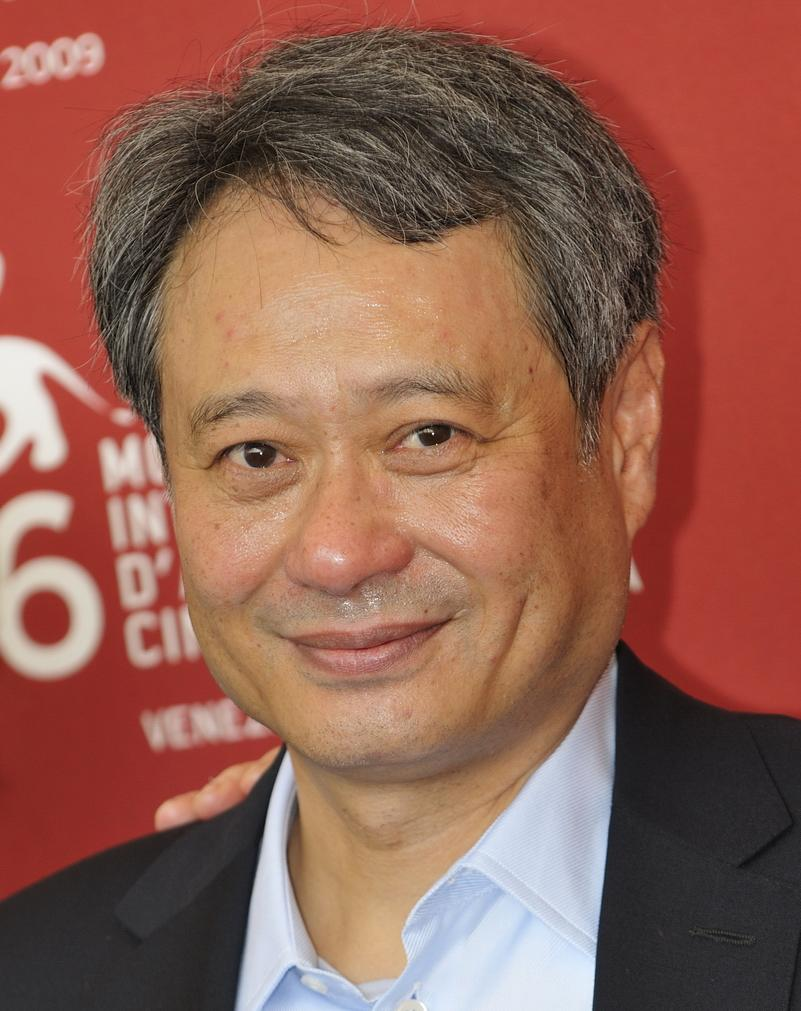
Ang Lee

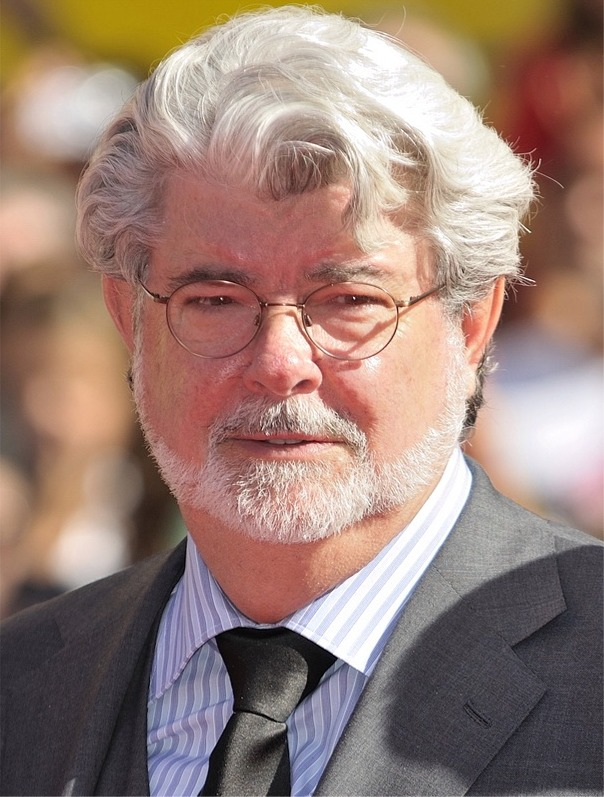
George Lucas
- Alan Ball, American writer, director and producer.
- Abel Ferrara, American filmmaker, known for the provocative and often controversial content in his movies and his use and redefinition of neo-noir imagery.
- Ang lee, American-Taiwanese filmmaker. he has received international critical and popular acclaim and numerous accolades including two Academy Awards, five BAFTA Awards, and three Golden Globe Awards. In 2003, he was ranked 27th in The Guardian's 40 best directors.
- George Lucas (May 14, 1944– ), American film director, producer, screenwriter, and entrepreneur.
- Oliver Stone (September 15, 1946– ), American film director, producer, and screenwriter. Stone won an Academy Award for Best Adapted Screenplay as writer of Midnight Express (1978), and wrote the gangster film remake Scarface (1983). Stone achieved prominence as writer and director of the war drama Platoon (1986), which won Academy Awards for Best Director and Best Picture also a BAFTA Award, as well as a Primetime Emmy Award and five Golden Globe Awards.
- Josephine Decker, American filmmaker. Films she has directed include Butter on the Latch (2013), Thou Wast Mild and Lovely.
- Richard Martini (12 March 1955– ), American film director, producer, screenwriter and freelance journalist.
- Shan Serafin (November 18, 1982– ), American film director, screenwriter, and novelist. In both film and literature he is known for his work in the thriller and action genres. For stage, the majority of his productions fall under drama.
- Michael D. Akers (September 5, 1970, in Ephrata, Pennsylvania- ), American film director, producer, screenwriter and Film editor.

== Monastics and clergy ==
- Ajahn Sumedho (1934–), one of the most senior Western representatives of the Thai Forest Tradition of Theravāda Buddhism
- Bhikkhu Bodhi (1944–), American Theravada scholarly monk and the second president of the Buddhist Publication Society
- Samanera Bodhesako (1939–1988), American Buddhist monk and the founder of Path Press
- Ṭhānissaro Bhikkhu (1949–), known for his translations of almost 1,000 Sutta in all and providing the majority of the sutta translations in a website known as "Access to Insight"

== Poets ==
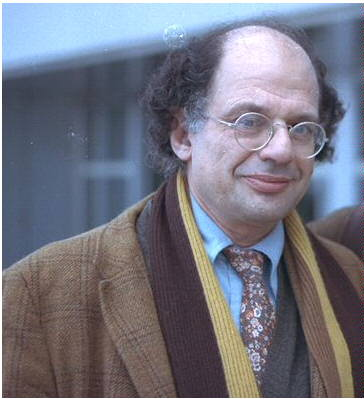
Allen Ginsberg

- Grace Cavalieri is an American poet and playwright.
- Albert Saijo (February 4, 1926 – June 2, 2011), Japanese-American poet associated with the Beat Generation. He and his family were imprisoned as part of the United States government's internment of Japanese Americans during World War II, during which time he wrote editorials on his experiences of internment for his high school newspaper. Saijo went on to serve in the U.S. Army and study at the University of Southern California. Later he became associated with Beat Generation figures including Jack Kerouac, with whom he wrote, traveled and became friends.
- Allen Ginsberg (June 3, 1926 - April 5, 1997), American poet and writer.
- Alurista, Chicano poet and activist.
- Chase Twichell, American poet, professor, publisher.
- Diane di Prima, American poet, known for her association with the Beat movement. She was also an artist, prose writer, and teacher.
- Gary Snyder (May 8, 1930– ), American poet, essayist, lecturer, and environmental activist.
- Jack Kerouac, American novelist and poet who, alongside William S. Burroughs and Allen Ginsberg, was a pioneer of the Beat Generation.
- Jane Hirshfield (February 24, 1953-) is an American poet, essayist, and translator, known as 'one of American poetry's central spokespersons for the biosphere' and recognized as 'among the modern masters,' 'writing some of the most important poetry in the world today.'
- John Giorno, American poet and performance artist. He founded the not-for-profit production company Giorno Poetry Systems and organized a number of early multimedia poetry experiments and events.
- John S. Hall (September 2, 1960– ), American poet, author, singer and lawyer perhaps best known for his work with King Missile, an avant-garde band that he co-founded in 1986 and has since led in various incarnations.
- Steven Sater, Tony Award, Grammy Award, and Laurence Olivier Award-winning American poet, playwright, lyricist, television writer and screenwriter. He is best known for writing the book and lyrics for the Tony Award-winning 2006 Broadway musical Spring Awakening.
- Tyler Knott Gregson, poet, author, essayist, and professional photographer.

== Politics ==
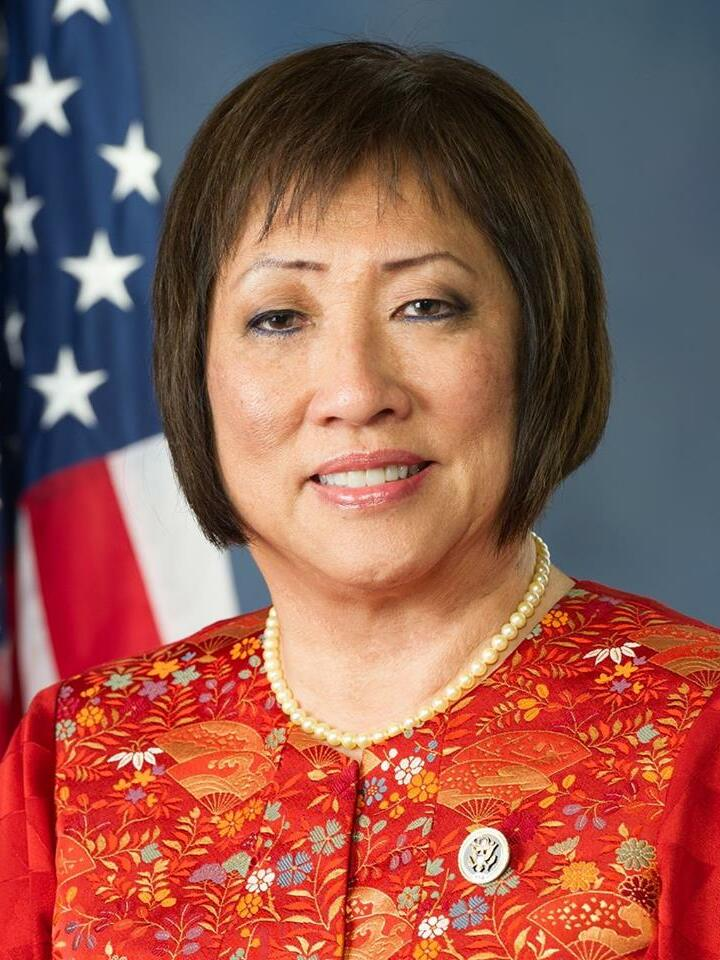
Colleen Hanabusa

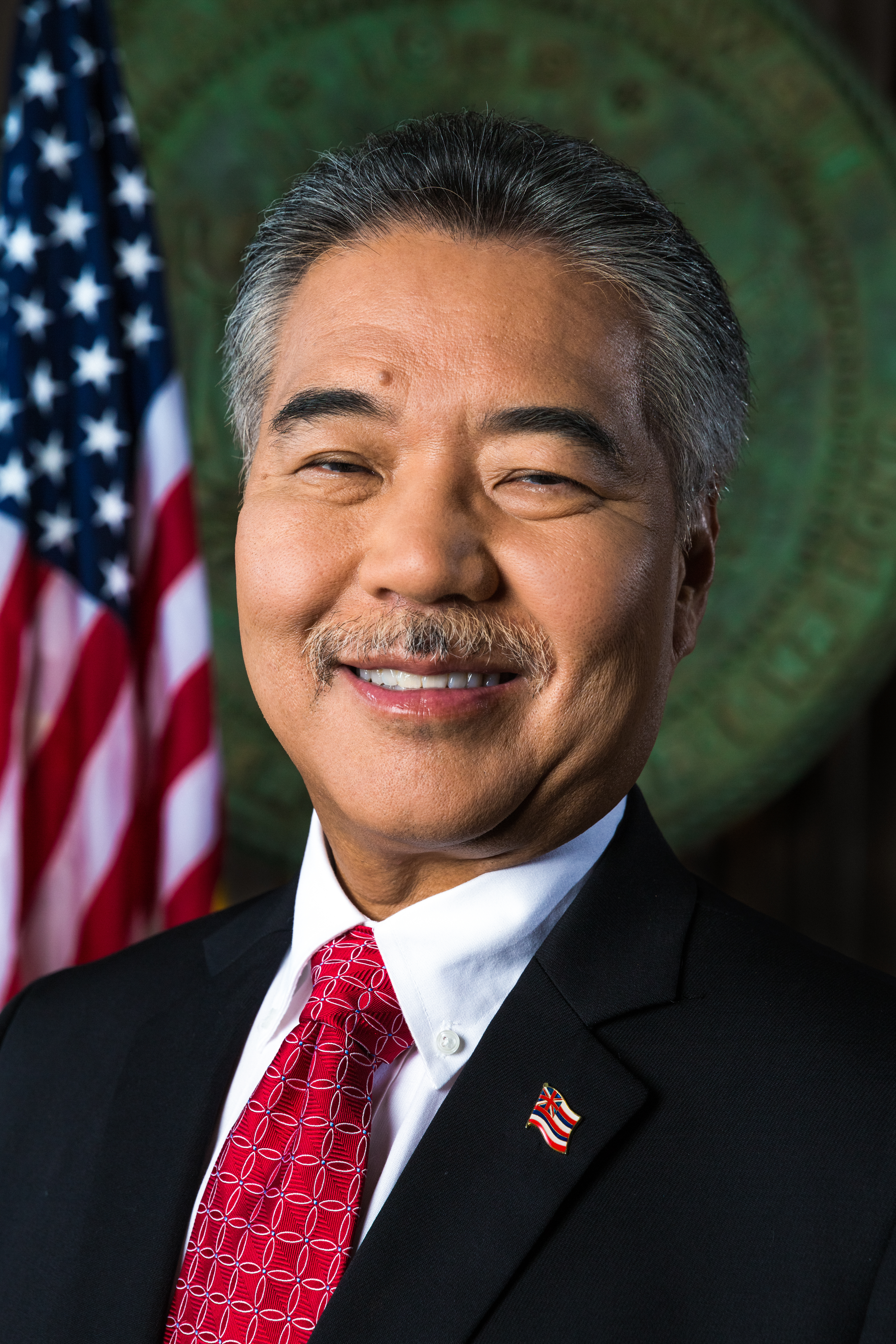
David Ige

- David Ige, American politician. He was the 8th Governor of Hawaii. A Democrat, he served in the Hawaii State Senate from 2003 to 2014 and the Hawaii House of Representatives from 1985 to 2003. In the 2014 gubernatorial election, he defeated incumbent Governor Neil Abercrombie in the Democratic primary, and won the general election over Republican nominee Duke Aiona. Ige was reelected in 2018.
- Colleen Hanabusa, U.S. Congresswoman (2011–2015, 2016–2019), Democrat and lawyer from Hawaii.
- Kazuhisa Abe (January 18, 1914 – May 18, 1996) was a Democratic state senator and justice of the Supreme Court of Hawaii.
- Mazie Hirono, U.S. Senator (2013–), U.S. Congresswoman (2007–2013) and Democrat from Hawaii; first elected female Senator from Hawaii, first Asian-American woman elected to the Senate, first U.S. Senator born in Japan and the nation's first Buddhist Senator.
- Hank Johnson, U.S. Congressman (2007–) and Democrat from Georgia; one of the first two Buddhists to serve in the United States Congress.
- Derek Tran, Democratic Congressman from CA-45 (2025–).
- Chi Ossé, American politician and activist from New York City who serves as a member of the New York City Council and son of Combat Jack.
- Irene Shin, American politician and former non-profit executive serving as a delegate of the Virginia House of Delegates since 2022.

== Science ==
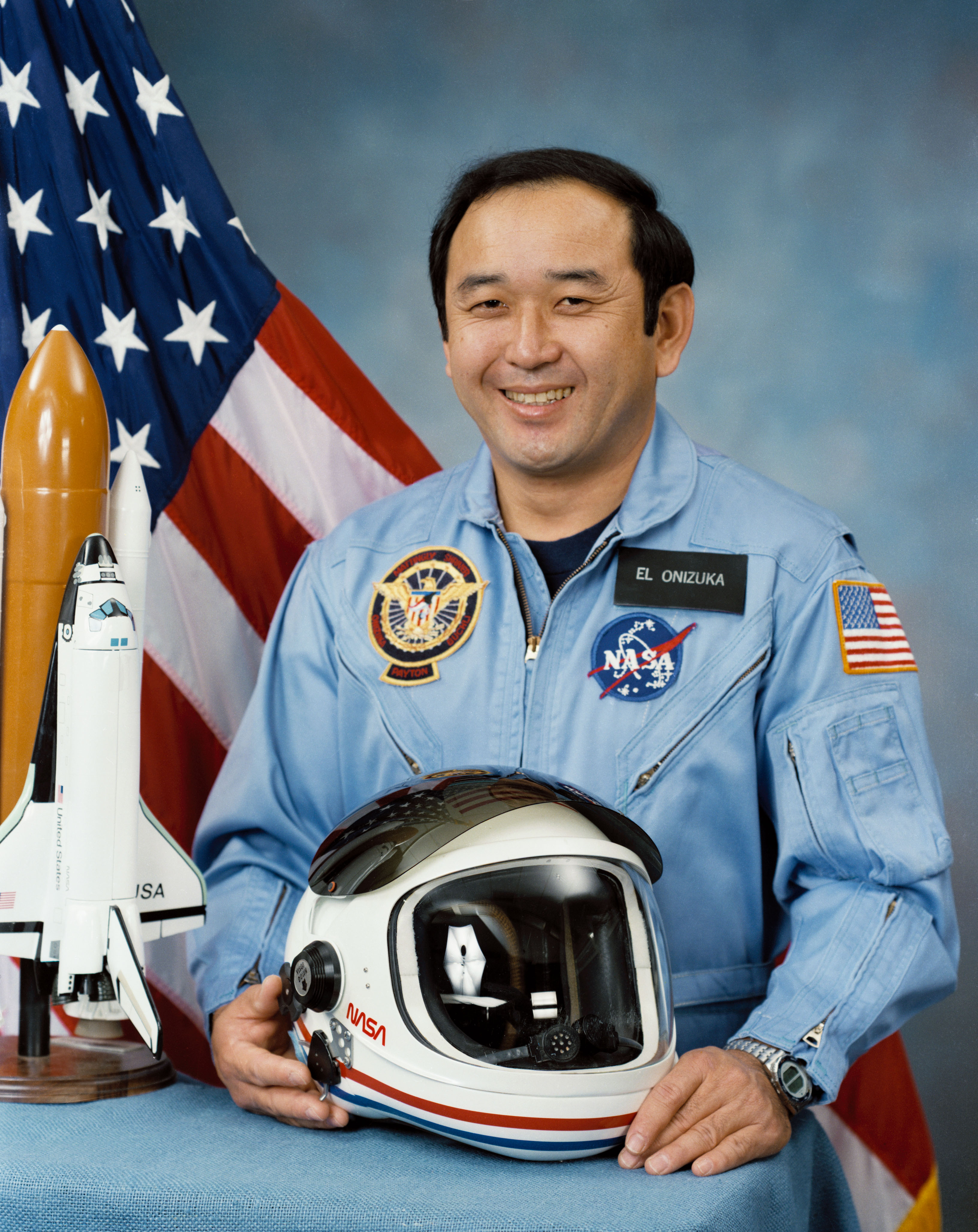
Ellison Onizuka

- Chester Carlson, (February 8, 1906 – September 19, 1968), American physicist, inventor, and patent attorney born in Seattle, Washington.He invented Xerography.
- Ellison Onizuka, American astronaut, engineer, and U.S. Air Force flight test engineer who successfully flew into space with the Space Shuttle Discovery on STS-51-C. He was first Buddhist to reach space.
- Anne Rudloe, American marine biologist. She was the co-founder of the Gulf Specimen Marine Laboratory in Panacea, Florida.
- James H. Austin, American neurologist and author. He is the author of the book Zen and the Brain. It establishes links between the neurophysiology of the human brain and the practice of meditation, and won the Scientific and Medical Network Book Prize for 1998. He has written five sequels: Zen-Brain Reflections (2006), Selfless Insight (2009), Meditating Selflessly (2011), Zen-Brain Horizons (2014) and Living Zen Remindfully (2016).
- Judith Roitman, American scientists and mathematician, a retired professor at the University of Kansas. She specializes in set theory, topology, Boolean algebras, and mathematics education.
- James J. Hughes (born May 27, 1961) is an American sociologist and bioethicist. He is the executive director of the Institute for Ethics and Emerging Technologies.
- Joseph Goguen (June 28, 1941 – July 3, 2006), American computer scientist. He was professor of Computer Science at the University of California and University of Oxford, and held research positions at IBM and SRI International.
- Chade-Meng Tan, American American computer scientist, motivator, and former software engineer.
- Frederick Lenz, American computer scientists, spiritual leader, writer, software designer, and record producer.
- Mark Epstein (1953– ), American author and psychotherapist who integrates Shakyamuni Buddha's teachings with Sigmund Freud's approaches to trauma. He often writes about the interface of Buddhism and psychotherapy.
- George I. Fujimoto (1920–2023) is an American chemist of Japanese descent.
- Ted Fujita (1920–1998), was a Japanese-American meteorologist whose research primarily focused on severe weather. His research at the University of Chicago on severe thunderstorms, tornadoes, hurricanes, and typhoons revolutionized the knowledge of each. Although he is best known for creating the Fujita scale of tornado intensity and damage.
- Harvey Itano (1920–2010), biochemist and member of the United States National Academy of Sciences.
- Mizuko Ito, cultural anthropologist at the University of California, Irvine.
- Akiko Iwasaki, immunologist and professor at Yale University.
- Michio Kaku, theoretical physicist specializing in string field theory.
- Akihiro Kanamori, mathematician specializing in set theory.
- Jay Kochi (1927–2008), chemist.
- John Maeda, computer scientist, artist, professor at MIT.
- Syukuro Manabe, 2021 Nobel Laureate in Physics.
- Yoky Matsuoka, computer scientist; 2007 MacArthur Fellow.
- Horace Yomishi Mochizuki (1937–1989), mathematician specializing in group theory.
- Shuji Nakamura, 2014 Nobel Laureate in Physics.
- Yoichiro Nambu (1921–2015), 2008 Nobel Laureate in Physics.
- Isaac Namioka (1928–2019), mathematician who worked in general topology and functional analysis.
- Charles J. Pedersen (1904–1989), 1987 Nobel laureate in Chemistry; his mother was Japanese.
- Gordon H. Sato (1927–2017), cell biologist and member of the United States Nanal Academy of Sciences.
- Ryuzo Yanagimachi, reproductive biologist and member of the United States National Academy of Sciences.

== Singers ==
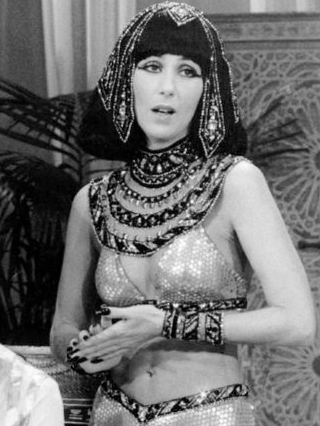
Cher

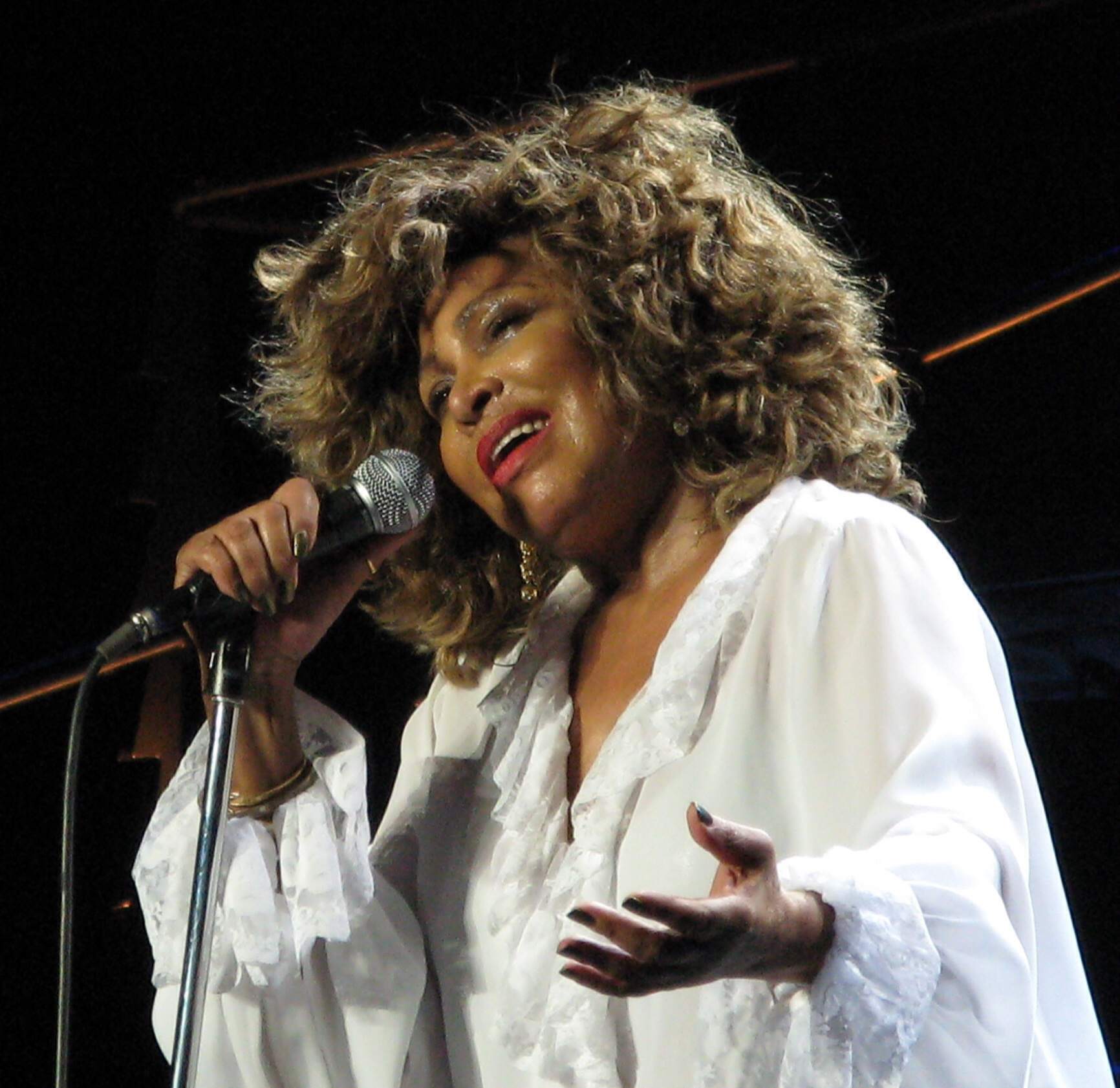
Tina Turner

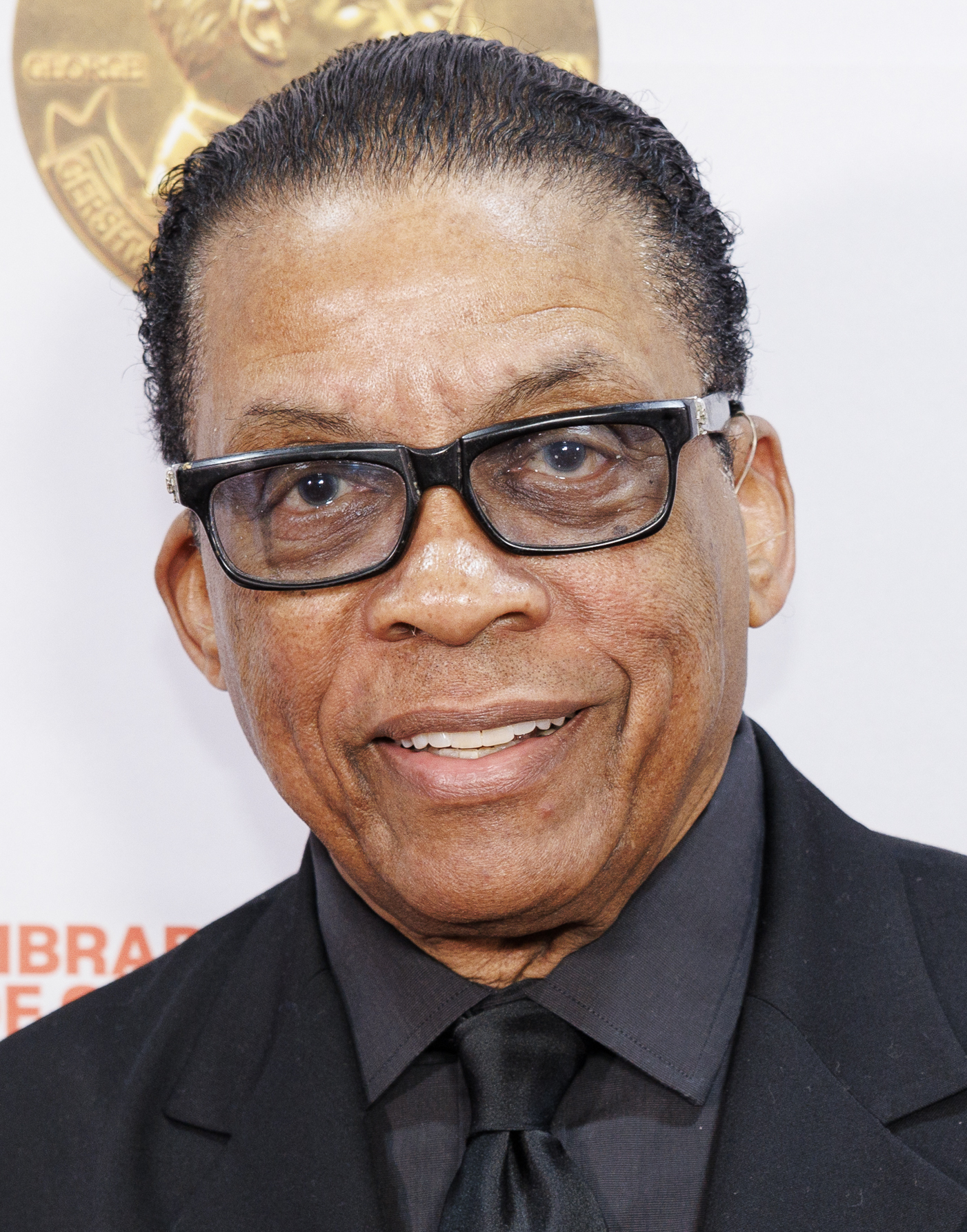
Herbie Hancock

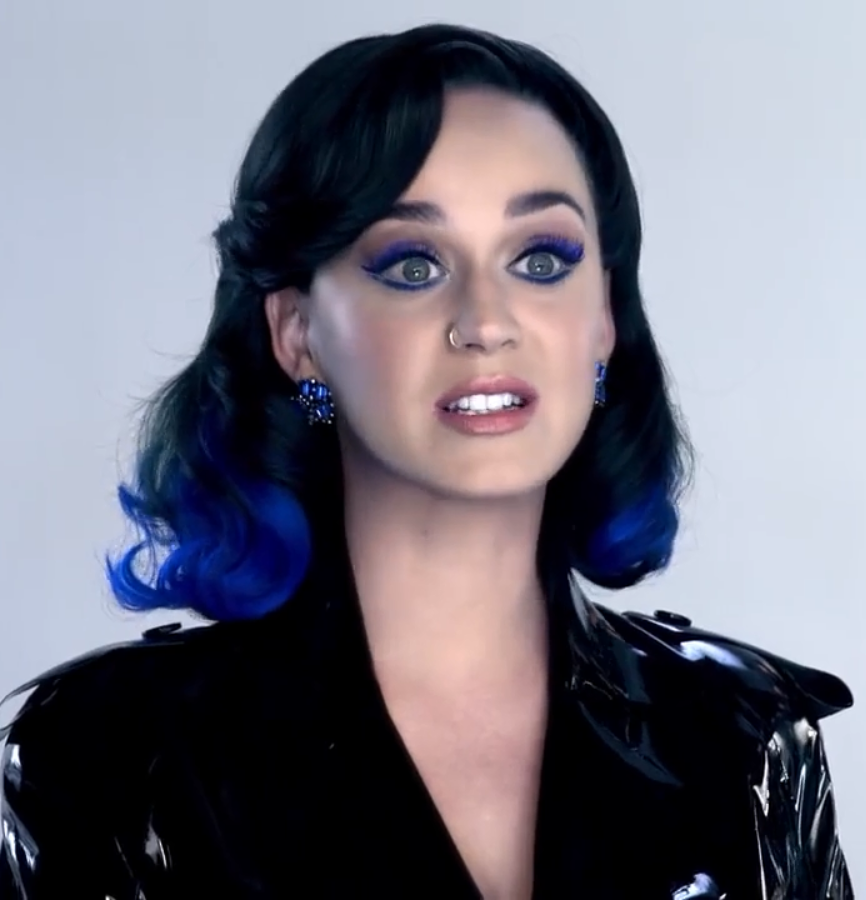
Katy Perry

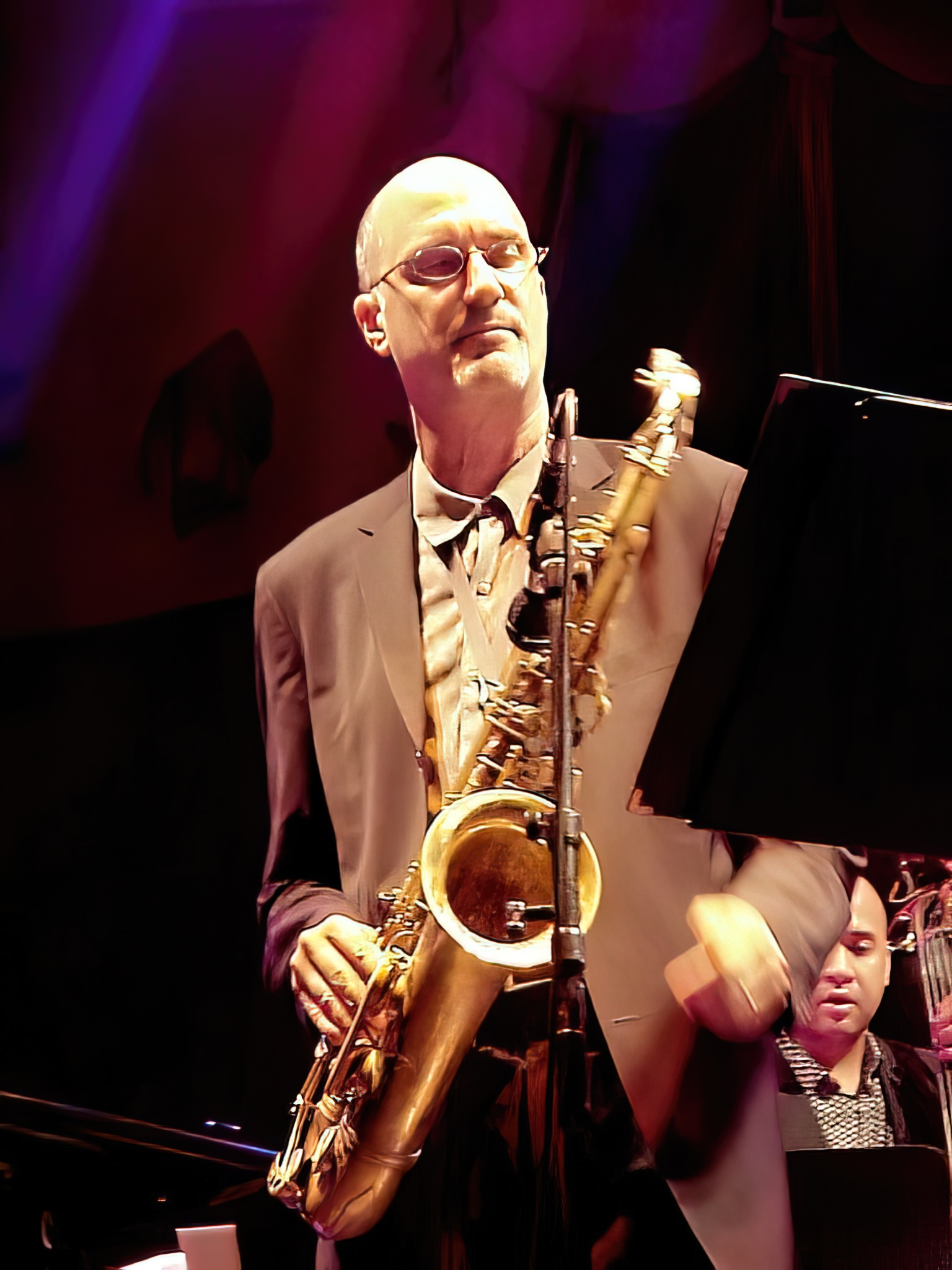
Michael Brecker
- Adam Yauch, better known under the stage name MCA, was an American rapper, bass player, filmmaker and a founding member of the hip hop group Beastie Boys.
- Alanis Morissette (1974– ), Canadian-American singer, songwriter, and actress. Known for her emotive mezzo-soprano voice and confessional songwriting, Morissette began her career in Canada in the early 1990s with two mildly successful dance-pop albums.
- Aliana Lohan (December 22, 1993– ), American singer, actress, fashion model and television personality. Ali Lohan converted to Buddhism after being raised in Catholicism.
- Arthur Russell, American cellist, composer, producer, singer, and musician.
- Anthony Newman (May 12, 1941– ), American classical musician. While mostly known as an organist, Newman is also a harpsichordist (including the pedal harpsichord), pianist, composer, conductor, writer, and teacher.
- Bennie Maupin, American jazz multireedist who performs on various saxophones, flute, and bass clarinet.
- Belinda Carlisle, American singer
- Brad Warner (1964- ), American Sōtō Zen monk, author, blogger, documentarian and punk rock bass guitarist.
- Buster Williams – , American jazz bassist
- Cher, American singer and actress known for her androgynous contralto voice, bold fashion and visual presentation, and multifaceted career. An influential figure in popular culture. Cher is widely regarded as the greatest and most influential Buddhist musician in world history.
- Chi Cheng (July 15, 1970 – April 13, 2013), American musician and poet, best known as the bassist and backing vocalist for the American alternative metal band Deftones.
- Chynna Rogers, American rapper, disc jockey, and model who was signed by Ford Modeling Agency at the age of 14 and affiliated with the ASAP Mob.
- Coco Lee, Chinese-American singer and songwriter.
- Courtney Love, American singer-songwriter
- David Freiberg, American musician best known for contributing vocals, keyboards, electric bass.
- Duncan Sheik – , American singer-songwriter and composer
- Combat Jack (July 8, 1964 – December 20, 2017), known professionally as Combat Jack, was a Haitian-American hip hop music attorney, executive, journalist, editor and podcaster.
- David Bennett Cohen, American musician best known as the original keyboardist and one of the guitar players for the late-1960s psychedelic rock and blues band Country Joe and the Fish.
- Earl Sweatshirt, American rapper, songwriter, and record producer. (Nichiren Buddhism)
- Eric Erlandson (1963– ), American musician, guitarist, and writer, primarily known as founding member, songwriter and lead guitarist of alternative rock band Hole from 1989 to 2002. Erlandson has practiced Buddhism since 1992.
- Esperanza Spalding, American bassist, singer, songwriter, and composer. Her accolades include 5 Grammy Awards, a Boston Music Award, a Soul Train Music Award.
- Herbie Hancock, American legendary jazz musician, bandleader, and composer. Hancock has won an Academy Award and 14 Grammy Awards, including Album of the Year for his 2007 album River: The Joni Letters, a tribute to his friend Joni Mitchell.
- Jesse Michaels (1969– ), American songwriter, vocalist, guitarist, artist, and author from Berkeley, California.
- John Cage, American singer and composer.
- Joseph Bowie (1953– ), American jazz trombonist and vocalist. The brother of trumpeter Lester Bowie, Joseph is known for leading the jazz-punk group Defunkt and for membership in the Ethnic Heritage Ensemble.
- Joseph Jarman (September 14, 1937 – January 9, 2019) was an American jazz musician, composer, poet, and Shinshu Buddhist priest.
- June Millington (April 14, 1948– ), Filipino American guitarist, songwriter, producer, educator, and actress.
- Katy Perry, American singer-songwriter, and television judge. She is known for her influence on the pop sound and style of the 2010s. Pursuing a career in gospel music at 16, Perry released her commercially successful debut album, Katy Hudson (2001), under Red Hill Records.
- Lorraine Hunt Lieberson, American mezzo-soprano. She was noted for her performances of both Baroque era and contemporary works.
- Melody Gardot, American jazz singer, songwriter, and musician well known for her smoky contralto voice, understated vocal delivery, and a musical style that blends jazz with blues, bossa nova, folk, and pop influences.
- Michael Brecker, American jazz saxophonist and composer. Over a four‑decade career, he recorded widely in jazz and popular music and appeared on more than 900 albums as a leader and sideman. He received 15 Grammy Awards.
- Miya Folick, American singer and song writer. She was raised as a Jōdo Shinshū Buddhist.
- Nikolai Fraiture, American-French musician best known as the bassist of the rock band The Strokes.
- Patti Smith, American singer, songwriter, poet, painter, author, and photographer.
- Paul Masvidal, American musician, best known as the guitarist, singer and a founding member of Cynic.
- Phạm Phi Nhung (10 April 1970 – 28 September 2021), Vietnamese-American singer, actress and humanitarian. She specialised in Dan Ca and Tru Tinh music. She sang for Paris By Night and Van Son and also acted in their plays and Tinh production. She also recorded music for Lang Van.
- Phoebe Snow, American roots music singer-songwriter and guitarist, known for her hit 1974 and 1975 songs "Poetry Man" and "Harpo's Blues", and her credited guest vocals backing Paul Simon on "Gone at Last".
- Peter Lieberson, American composer of contemporary classical music.
- Peter Rowan (1942– ), American bluegrass musician and composer. Rowan plays guitar and mandolin, yodels and sings.
- Laurie Anderson (1947– ), American avant-garde artist, composer, musician, and film director whose work spans performance art, pop music, and multimedia projects. Initially trained in violin and sculpting. She became more widely known outside the art world when her single "O Superman" reached number two on the UK singles chart in 1981. She also starred in and directed the 1986 concert film Home of the Brave.
- Li Na, Chinese-American folk singer that gained particular popularity in the late 1980s and the 1990s China.
- Miguel Atwood-Ferguson, American singer, arranger, composer, music director, producer, DJ, orchestral conductor and educator.
- Nikolas Schreck, American singer-songwriter, musician, author, film-maker and Tantric Buddhist religious teacher based in Berlin, Germany.
- Roberta Donnay (August 10, 1966, Washington, D.C.- ), American jazz singer. jazz vocalist, composer, and band leader produced by Orrin Keepnews. She is a practicing Buddhist.
- Rob Mounsey, American musician, composer, and arranger.
- Rick Rubin American record producer. He is a co-founder of Def Jam Recordings, founder of American Recordings, and former president of Columbia Records. He practiced Buddhism and meditation.
- Stacey Q, American pop singer-songwriter, dancer and actress. Her best-known single, John Mitchell's "Two of Hearts", released in 1986, reached number one in Canada, number three on the US Billboard Hot 100 and the top ten in five other countries.
- Steven Sater – , American playwright, lyricist and screenwriter best known for Spring Awakenings
- Suzanne Nadine Vega, American singer-songwriter best known for her folk-inspired music. Vega's music career spans almost 40 years.
- Tina Turner, American singer-songwriter and received 12 Grammy Awards, which include eight competitive awards, a Grammy Lifetime Achievement Award and three Grammy Hall of Fame inductions. Rolling Stone ranked her among the greatest artists and greatest singers of all time. She was the first black artist and first woman to be on the cover of Rolling Stone, the first female black artist to win an MTV Award.
- Wayne Shorter (August 25, 1933 – March 2, 2023), American jazz saxophonist and composer.
- Zeena Schreck, American singer, visual and musical artist, author and the spiritual leader of the Sethian Liberation Movement (SLM).

== Soldiers ==
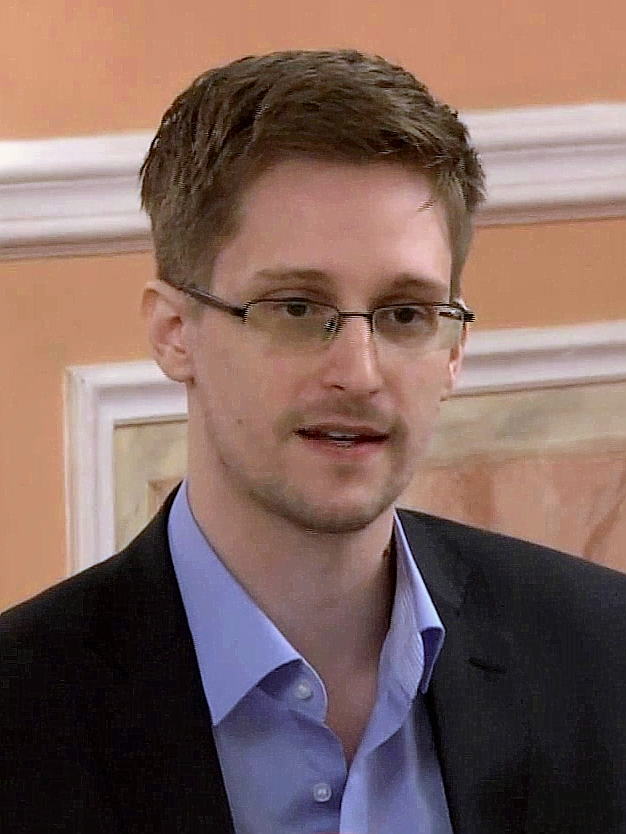
Edward Snowden

- Aidan Delgado, American attorney, author, and war veteran. His 2007 book The Sutras of Abu Ghraib detailed his experiences during his deployment in Iraq.
- Claude AnShin Thomas, American Buddhist monk and Vietnam Veterans Memorial.
- Richard Machowicz, American Navy SEAL officer and the host of the Discovery Channel and Military Channel show Future Weapons. He was the newest member on Spike's show Deadliest Warrior.
- George Lennon (25 May 1900 – 20 February 1991), American-Irish Republican Army leader during the Irish War of Independence and the Irish Civil War.
- Edward Snowden, American NSA agent and whistleblower.
- John David Provoo (August 6, 1917 – August 28, 2001), United States Army staff sergeant.
- Peter Matthiessen, American CIA agent, novelist, naturalist, wilderness writer and zen teacher.
- Lawrence Rockwood, American human rights and democratic socialist activist who is a former U.S. Army counterintelligence officer.
- Shiro Kashiwa (October 24, 1912 – March 13, 1998), first Attorney General of Hawaii to be appointed after it became a state in 1959.
- Ming Chang – rear admiral (upper half), U.S. Navy, retired. Department of Navy Inspector General, 1987–1990
- Dan Choi, first lieutenant, U.S. Army. Gay rights advocate.
- Viet Xuan Luong, Major General, US Army Japan
- Lapthe Flora, Major General, Combined Joint Task Force – Horn of Africa

== Sports ==
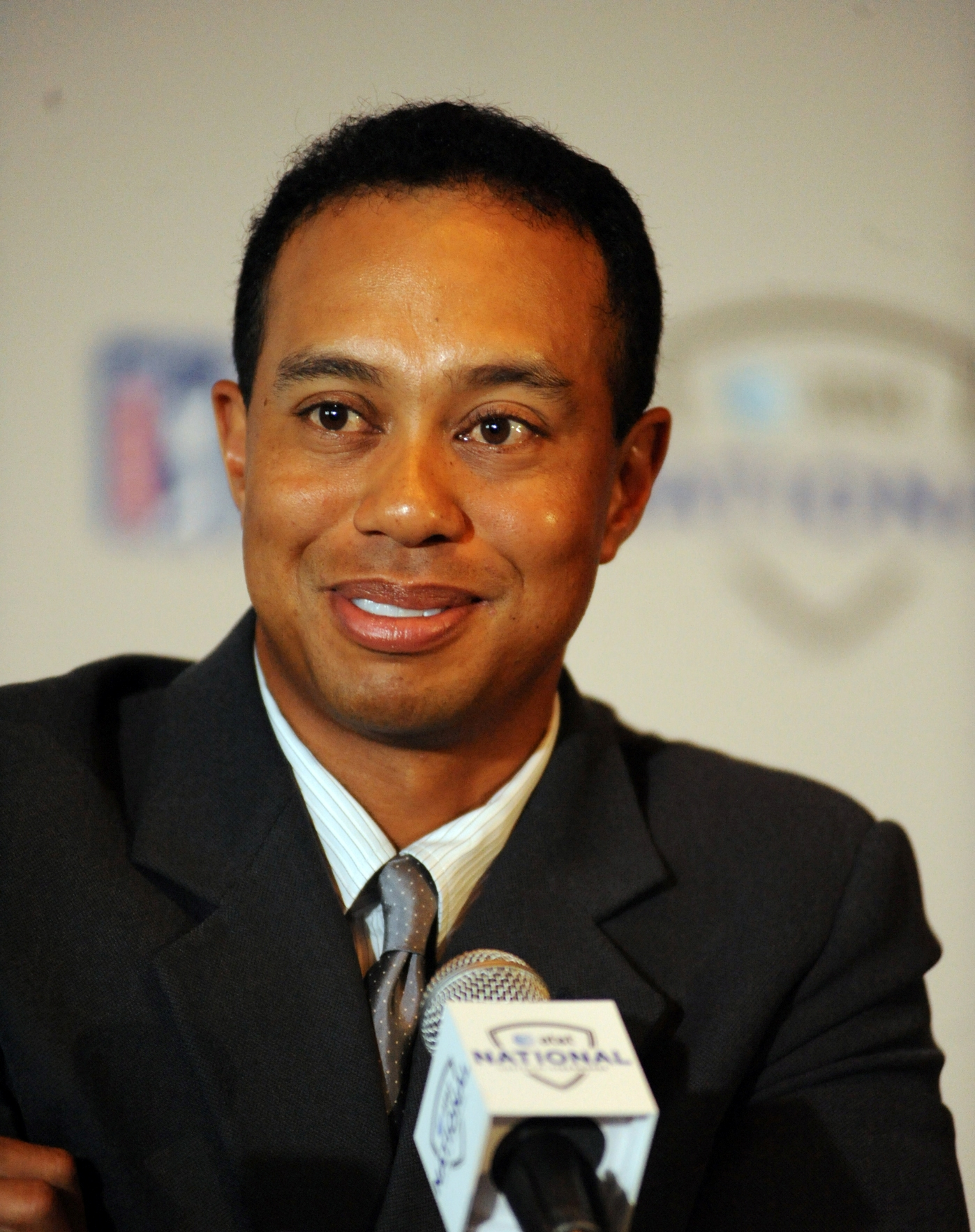
Tiger Woods

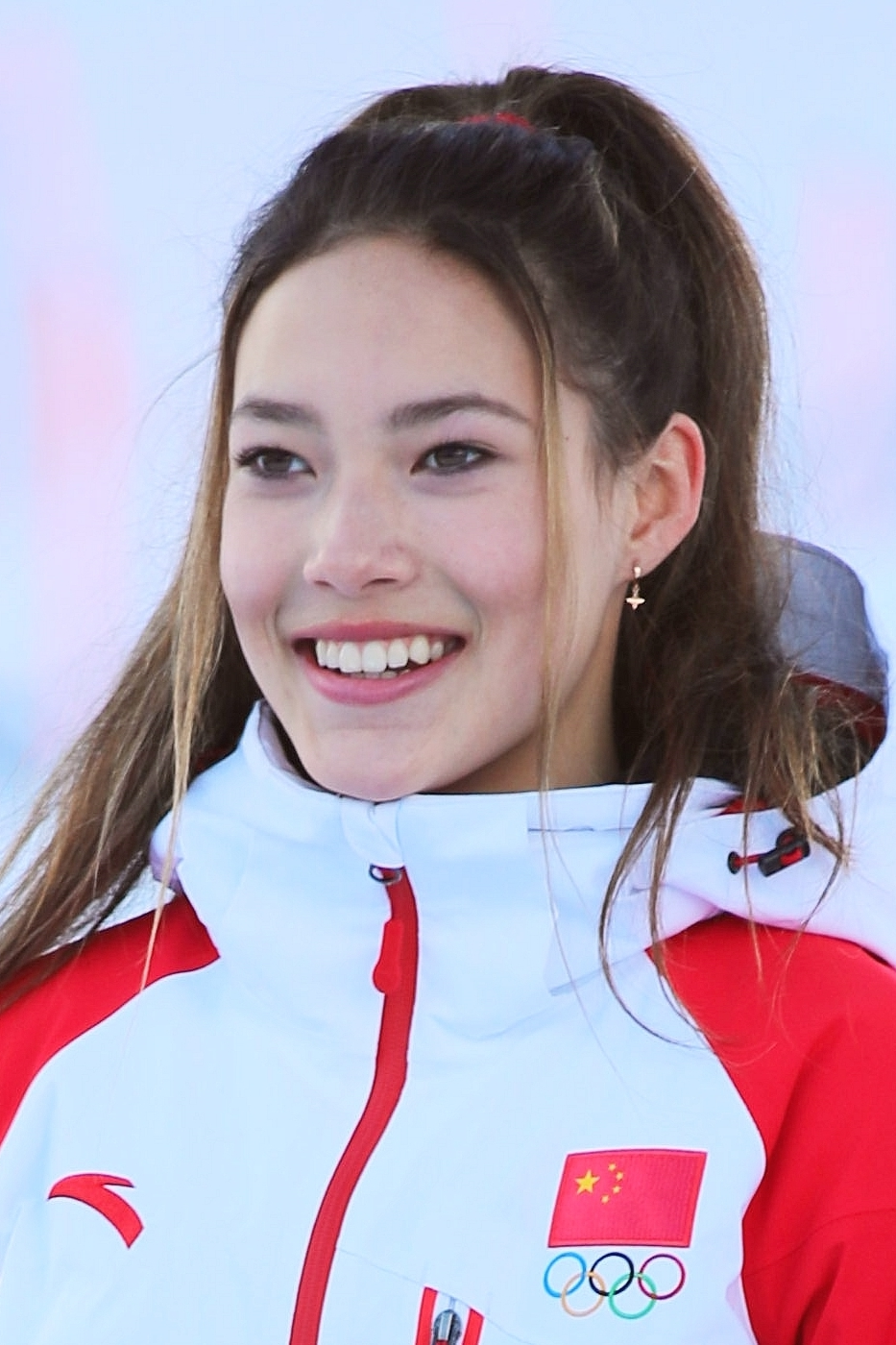
Eileen Gu

- Alex Rodriguez, American former professional baseball shortstop, third baseman and designated hitter and current businessman. Rodriguez played 22 seasons in Major League Baseball (MLB).
- Anthony Ervin, American gold medalist swimmer.(Zen)
- Dave Bautista (January 18, 1969– ), American actor and former professional wrestler.
- DeAndre Jordan (July 21, 1988– ), American professional basketball player for the Denver Nuggets of the National Basketball Association (NBA). He played one season of college basketball for the Texas A&M Aggies.
- Eileen Gu, American freestyle skier and one of the highest-paid women's athletes worldwide.
- Josh Scobey (December 11, 1979– ), former American football running back and kick returner who played seven seasons in the National Football League (NFL).
- Phil Jackson, American former professional basketball player, coach, and executive. A power forward, Jackson played 12 seasons in the NBA, winning NBA championships with the New York Knicks in 1970 and 1973. Jackson was the head coach of the Chicago Bulls from 1989 to 1998, leading them to six NBA championships. He then coached the Los Angeles Lakers from 1999 to 2004 and again from 2005 to 2011; the team won five league titles under his leadership. Jackson's 11 NBA titles as a coach surpassed the previous record of nine set by Red Auerbach.
- Matt Sydal, American professional wrestler currently signed to All Elite Wrestling (AEW).
- Metta Sandiford-Artest (November 13, 1979– ), American former professional basketball player.
- Sandje Ivanchukov, (July 23, 1960 – August 29, 2007), American soccer defender who played professionally in the North American Soccer League, American Soccer League and Major Indoor Soccer League.
- Tiger Woods (1975– ), American professional golfer. He is tied for first in PGA Tour wins, ranks second in men's major championships, and holds numerous golf records. Woods is widely regarded as one of the greatest golfers of all time and one of the most famous athletes in history. He is an inductee of the World Golf Hall of Fame.
- Orlando Cepeda, American former Major League Baseball first baseman and member of the Hall of Fame.
- Willie Davis, American professional baseball player. He played in Major League Baseball and the Nippon Professional Baseball league as a center fielder.

== Writers ==
- E. Hoffmann Price (July 3, 1898 - June 18, 1988), American writer of popular fiction (he was a self-titled 'fictioneer') for the pulp magazine marketplace.
- Michael Herr, American writer, war correspondent and well known for Apocalypse Now (1979).
- Richard C. Morais, American novelist and journalist. He is the author of three books, including The Hundred-Foot Journey which is an international bestseller.
- Jess Row (1974 in Washington, D.C.- ), American short story writer, novelist, and professor.
- Claire Myers Owens, American writer and novelist well-known for her contribution in Rochester Zen Center.
- Walter Evans-Wentz, American anthropologist and writer who was a pioneer in the study of Tibetan Buddhism.
- Helen Tworkov, American writer and founder of Tricycle: The Buddhist Review.
- Kenneth Pai, Chinese-American writer
- Jack Kornfield (1945–), American book writer, student of renowned forest monk Ajahn Chah, and teacher of Theravada Buddhism
- Joseph Goldstein (1944-), one of the first American Vipassana teachers, contemporary author of numerous popular books on Buddhism
- Sharon Salzberg (1952-), author and teacher of Buddhist meditation practice, emphasize on insight and loving-kindness meditation methods
- Maya Soetoro-Ng (1970-), Indonesian-American writer, university instructor and maternal half-sister of Barack Obama, the 44th President of the United States

== Zen Teachers ==
- Adyashanti (1962–)
- Robert Baker Aitken (1917–2010)
- Anne Hopkins Aitken (1911–1994)
- Reb Anderson (1943–)
- Zentatsu Richard Baker (1936–)
- Joko Beck (1917–2011)
- Sherry Chayat (1943–)
- Issan Dorsey (1933–1990)
- Zoketsu Norman Fischer (1946–)
- James Ishmael Ford (1948–)
- Tetsugen Bernard Glassman (1939–2018)
- Paul Haller
- Ralph Chapin
- Cheri Huber (1944–)
- Soenghyang (Barbara Rhodes, 1948–)
- Philip Kapleau (1912–2004)
- Houn Jiyu-Kennett (1924–1996)
- Bodhin Kjolhede (1948–)
- Jakusho Kwong (1935–)
- Taigen Dan Leighton (1950–)
- John Daido Loori (1931–2009)
- Dai Bai Zan Cho Bo Zen Ji (1954–)
- Heng Sure (1949–)
- Bonnie Myotai Treace (1956–)
- Brad Warner (1964–)

== See also ==
- Pariyatti (bookstore)
- Tricycle: The Buddhist Review
- Walk for Peace
- The Dhamma Brothers
- Vipassana movement
- List of Buddhists
- Buddhism and Christianity
- List of British Buddhists
- List of Korean Buddhists
- List of Marathi Buddhists
- Buddhism in the United States
- Zen in the United States
- Category:American Buddhists
- List of Buddhist temples in the United States
