= Ramratan Janorkar =

Indian politician

Mayor of Nagpur
- In office 1976–1977

Personal details
- Party: Republican Party of India

Ramratan Janorkar was a dalit leader and former mayor of Nagpur city.

Janorkar was born in the bhangi sweeper caste. He later dedicated his life to the Ambedkar movement and converted to Buddhism.

He was a member of Republican Party of India and elected as mayor of Nagpur in 1976. He served as mayor in 1976–77.
