= Andy Puddicombe =

British writer and meditation advocate

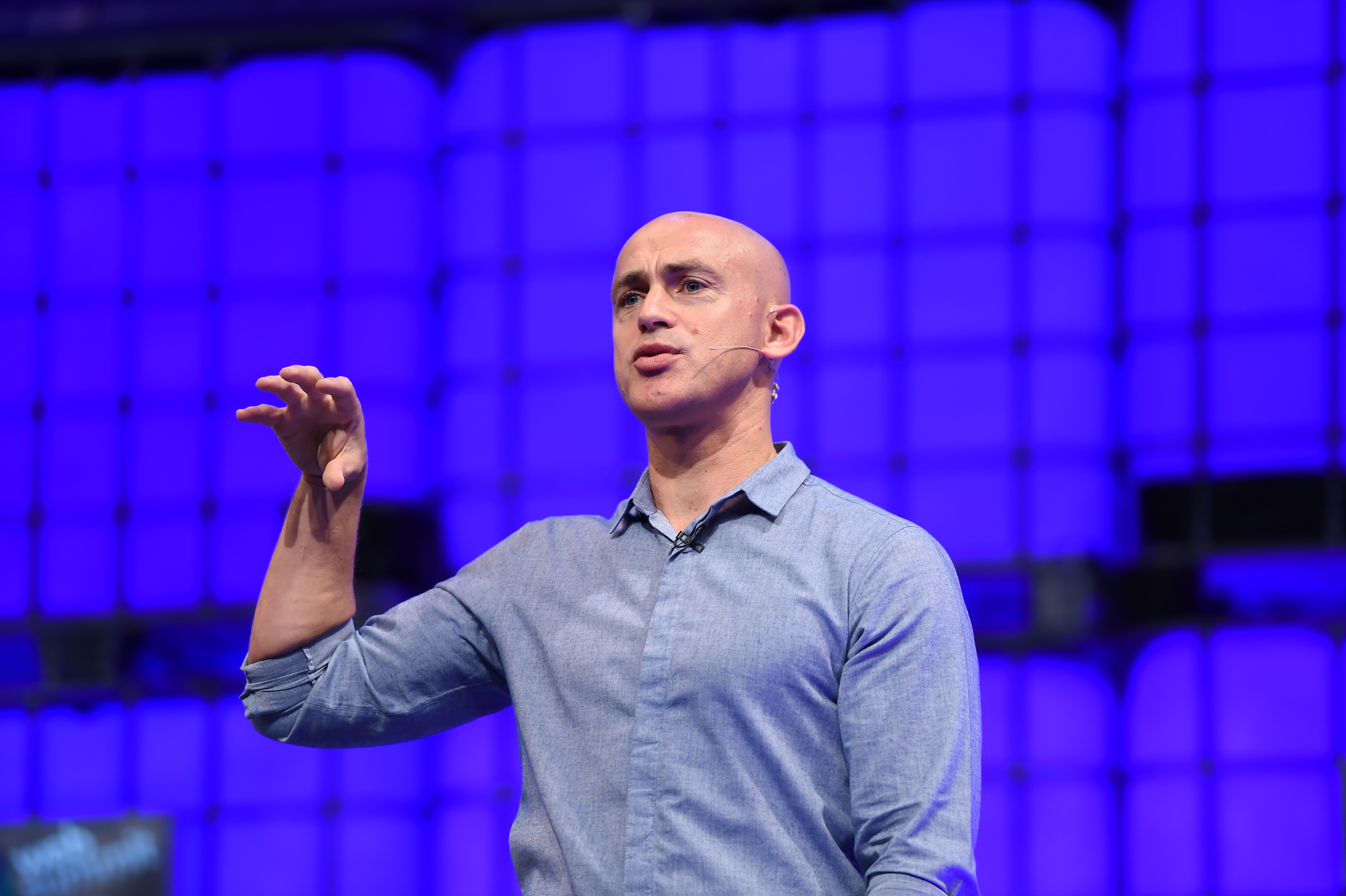
- Born: 23 September 1972 (age 53); London, England
- Occupations: Author; public speaker; Meditation and mindfulness teacher
- Years active: 2004–present
- Known for: Headspace

Andy Puddicombe (born 23 September 1972) is a British author, public speaker and a teacher of meditation and mindfulness. He, alongside Richard Pierson, is the co-founder of Headspace, a digital health company that provides guided meditation training and mindfulness for its users.

Puddicombe is a former Buddhist monk with a degree in Circus Arts.

== Early life and education ==
Puddicombe was born in London but grew up in Bristol, UK. He attended Wellsway Comprehensive School in Keynsham, studied Sports Science at De Montfort University, and obtained a Foundation Degree in Circus Arts.

== Career ==
=== Buddhism ===
In 1994, Puddicombe gave up his studies in sports science and travelled to Asia to train as a Buddhist monk. He has attributed this in part to an effort to cope with the trauma of bereavement.

His meditation training took him to India, Nepal, Myanmar, Thailand, Australia and Russia; culminating in full ordination at a Tibetan monastery in India, in the Himalayas. Having completed a one-year cloistered retreat in Scotland, he returned to Russia, where he taught meditation in Moscow for four years before reaching the end of his monastic commitment.

In 2004 Puddicombe returned to the UK where he studied Circus Arts in London while simultaneously building his own private meditation practice in the city, wanting to make "meditation and mindfulness accessible, relevant and beneficial to as many people as possible".

=== Meditation consultant ===
Puddicombe set up a private meditation practice in 2006, and spent the next four years working as a mindfulness consultant, while adapting the language and techniques he had previously learned. During this time he met his future business partner and co-founder of Headspace, Rich Pierson. Puddicombe has often attributed the success of Headspace to Pierson's involvement.

=== Headspace ===
Headspace launched in 2010, originally as an events company in London. Its first online meditations were uploaded to its website before January 2012, when the first Headspace app was launched. Puddicombe stepped back from the board in 2022 and left the company with his co-founder Rich Pierson.

== Writing ==
Puddicombe has written three books, all published by Hodder & Stoughton, Hachette.

- Get Some Headspace (2011) is an in-depth introduction to the Headspace techniques. (also published as Meditation and Mindfulness)
- The Headspace Diet (2013) teaches readers how to use mindfulness rather than fad-diets to reach their ideal personal weight. (also published as Mindful Eating)
- The Headspace Guide to...a Mindful Pregnancy (2015) sets out to teach couples how to calmly navigate the anxieties and demands of pregnancy.

Puddicombe is a regular contributor to The Guardian, The Times, Five Books and Huffington Post, writing about the benefits of mindfulness.

== Television and radio ==
In 2013, Puddicombe was featured on the BBC science documentary, Horizon 'The Truth About Personality', in which the Headspace app was tested for efficacy.

Puddicombe contributes to BBC News and BBC Radio on matters of meditation, mindfulness, mental health and lifestyle. In 2010 he took part in the Pause For Thought series on BBC Radio 2. He has made appearances on the Dr Oz show, ABC news, and The Tonight Show Starring Jimmy Fallon. He also hosts a podcast named "Radio Headspace" alongside other contributors.

== Personal life ==
In 2013, Puddicombe announced that he was receiving treatment for testicular cancer. In an interview with the Guardian newspaper, he revealed how mindfulness had helped him to cope with the physical, emotional and mental impact of the illness.

In August 2014, Puddicombe was one of 200 public figures who were signatories to a letter to The Guardian opposing Scottish independence in the run-up to September's referendum on that issue.

In December 2020, Puddicombe moved to Lisbon, Portugal, where he currently lives with his wife and two sons.

== See also ==
- Tibetan Buddhism
- Headspace
