= Yashwant Manohar =

Marathi poet

- Born: 26 March 1943 (age 83)
- Education: Dr. Babasaheb Ambedkar Marathwada University
- Writing career
- Notable work: Utthangumpha (1977)

Yashwant Manohar (born 26 March 1943) is an Indian Marathi poet, writer, and a literary critic. He gained fame with his first poetry collection Utthangumpha (उत्थानगुंफा) published in 1977. His poetry speaks fiercely against caste oppression and advocates equality, liberty, and fraternity. The poetry of Manohar is deeply influenced by the life and works of B. R. Ambedkar. Manohar is a Buddhist.

== Literary Works ==
=== Poetry ===
- "Utthangumpha" (Pune: Continental, Third edition, 2000)
- "Karoyabkimayin" (Nagpur: Yugasakshi, second edition, 2007)
- "Moortibhanjan" (Pune: Srividya, 1985)
- "Jeevanayan" (Mumbai: Maui Prakashan Griha, 2001)
- "Pratikshayan" (Nagpur: Yugasakshi, 2008)
- "Agnicha Aadibandha" (Nagpur: Yugasakshi, 2008)
- "Swapnmasainhite" (Mumbai: Mauj Prakashan Griha, 2008)

=== Novels ===
- "Ramai" (Nagpur: Yugasakshi, 28th edition, 2007)
- "Mi Savitri" (Nagpur: Yugasakshi, 2006)
- "Mi Yashodhara" (Nagpur: Yugasakshi)

=== Non-Fiction ===
==== (i) Travelogue ====
- "Simaranachi Kaaranjl" (Nagpur: Yugasakshi, second edition, 2005)

==== (ii) Collections of Letters ====
- "Patraprajakta" (Gadchiroli: Abhinav Publication, 2003)
- "Lakshman Mane yartnat Dhammapatee" (Nagpur: Yugasakshi, 2006)
- "Patrapaurnima" (Nagpur: Yugasakshi, 2007)

==== (iii) Collections of Commemorative and other articles ====
- "Saatarea Rut Ashrunicha" (Nagpur: Yugasakshi, 2005)
- "Varroyaat Hasalelee Phucle" (Nagpur: Yugasakshi)
- "Urjecke Wethai" (Nagpur: Yugasakshi, 2009)

=== Criticism ===
- "Bal Sitaram Mardhekar" (Sahitya Akademi, New Delhi, 1987, 1993, Third edition 1997)
- "Nibanthakar Dr. Ambedkar" (Nagpur: Sanghamitra, 1988)
- "Dalit Sahitya Chintan" (Nagpur: Sanghamitra, 1988)
- "Anibedkaroadi Aaswadak Samiksh" (Kolhapur: Priyadarshi, 1991)
- "Marathi Kavita aani Aadhunikata" (Nagpur: Ambedkar Dhamma, Second edition 1998)
- "Amibedkari Chalazwat aani Satya" (Nagpur: Abhay Prakashan, 1993)
- "Ambedkarwadi Marathi Sahitya" (Bhimaratna Prakashan, 1999)
- "Vicharsagharsha" (Yavatmal: Yugandhara, 2004)
- "Yugasakshi Sahitya" (Warora: Shreyas Prakashan, 2000)
- "Sahitya Sanskriticcya Prakashwata" (Nagpur: Akanksha Prakashan, 2005)
- "Budditiwnué Saudaryeshastra" (Nagpur: Yugasakshi, 2007, Second edition 2008)

=== Ideological Writings ===
- "Prabodhanoichar" (Nagpur: Mahabodhi, 1989)
- "Aapaie Mahakaryatule Nayak + Shambuk-Karna-Exlacya" (Nagpur: Yugasakshi, 1991)
- "Aaplya Krantiche Shifpakar Anibedkar-Phule Budd" (Mahabodhi, Nagpur, 1999)
- "Dr. Ambedkar Ek Shaktivedha" (Nagpur: Sanghamitra, 1999)
- "Dr, Ambedkaraancha Budhla Konata?" (Nagpur: Yugasakshi, Second edition 2005)
- "Bahujan Krantiche Nayak Jyotiba Phule" (Pune: Krantiparva Prakashan, 1998)
- "Mulyamanthan" (Nagpur: Yugasakshi, 2004)
- "Samajaparivartanachi Disha" (Dhammabhumi Prakashan, 2005)
- "Dr. Ambedkaranni Manusmaruti ka Jalaii?" (Nagpur: Yugasakshi, 2005)
- "Buddhache Tatwoadayat aani Bauddhanchi Bhasha" (Nagpur: Yugasakshi, 2007)

== Chronology ==
- 1967 - M.A. in Marathi in Dr. Babasaheb Ambedkar Marathwada University, Aurangabad
- 1969 - Lecturer in Marathi at Pratishthan Mahavidyalaya, Paithan
  - Lecturer, Nagpur Mahavidyalaya, Nagpur
- 1977 - Utthangumpha, the first collection of poems published
- 1979 - Joined the Post- graduation Teaching Department, Rashtrasant Tukadoji Maharaj Nagpur University
- 1980 - Maharashtra State Government Award for the Best Literary Work
- 1983-1987 - Member, Marathi Advisory Board, Sahitya Akademi
  - 1984 - Awarded Ph.D. Rashtrasant Tukadoji Maharaj Nagpur University
- 1989 - Maharashtra State Government Award for the Best literary work
  - 1989 -90 President, Maharashtra Rajya Sahitya Sanskriti Mandal
- 1993 -Represented Marathi at the National Poets’ Meet held in Lucknow
- 1995 - Maharashtra State Government Award for the Best literary work
- 2000 - Phule-Ambedkar Sahitya Panchayat Award, Satara
- 2001 - Bhalachandra Phadake Award, Maharashtra Sahitya Parishad, Pune
- 2002 - Padmashree Vikhe Patil Award
- 2003 - Maharashtra Foundation Award
  - Parivartanwaadi Sahityik Award, Kurundawadi, Kolhapur
- 2009 - Indira Sant Award
