= Prakash Gajbhiye =

Indian politician

Prakash Gajbhiye is a Member of Maharashtra Legislative Council who belongs to the Nationalist Congress Party (NCP). He was the leader of opposition in Nagpur Municipal Corporation and Senate member in the Nagpur University.
