= Sampat Ramteke =

Social activist

Sampat Tukaram Ramteke
- Born: 25 August 1949; Chandrapur, Maharashtra, India
- Died: 16 November 2017 (aged 68); Nagpur, Maharashtra, India
- Occupation: Engineer
- Known for: Social activism
- Awards: Padma Shri (2018)

Sampat Tukaram Ramteke (Aug 1949 - Nov 2017) was an engineer and social activist from Nagpur, Maharashtra, India. In 2018, he was conferred the Padma Shri civilian honour posthumously, for his contribution in raising awareness in India about the sickle cell disease.

He brought into notice Sickle Cell Disease as a serious health concern along with the societal issues faced by patients and their families in India. The Ministry of Health and Family Welfare had also informed Lok Sabha about the work and awareness created by Sickle Cell Society of India for Sickle Cell Disease in India.

== Education and career ==
Shri Sampat Ramteke received Diploma in Electrical Engineering from Government Polytechnic Nagpur. Later he worked at Western Coalfields Limited (WCL) Ministry of Coal, Government of India and retired in 2009 as Superintending Engineer.

== Social activism ==
Sampat Ramteke is considered a torchbearer of the movement to raise awareness of sickle cell disease. He began this work when his son Harshal was diagnosed with the disease at the age of 3. In 1991, he founded the Sickle Cell Society of India (SCSI) and worked towards raising awareness of sickle cell for over three decades. Due to his efforts, more than 15 government resolutions (GR) were passed to help patients with sickle cell. Most notably, patients with the disease came to be included in the Rights of Persons with Disabilities Act (2016).

He organised more than 250 sickle cell awareness and blood investigation camps with his colleagues in Madhya Pradesh, Chhattisgarh, Orissa, Kerala and various districts of Maharashtra. He worked with the States of Maharashtra and Chhattisgarh on the preparation of action plans in 2003 and 2007 respectively. He worked on the creation of informational materials on the disease for the National Rural Health Mission.

== Awards ==
Shri Ramteke is the recipient of many International, National and State Awards. He was adjudicated “Appreciation Plaque by Commonwealth Association for Health and Disability, London, UK in 2016, on account of exemplary seminars and immense contribution towards the welfare of specially challenged Sickle Cell Community of India” and “Global Appreciation in the field of sickle cell advocacy by President of Global Sickle Cell Disease Network, Canada, in 2017”. Magnum foundation Nagpur conferred on him “Manav Mitra National Magnum Honour for the work in Sickle Cell Disease management services in Maharashtra, in 2001”. Mahatma Phule Talent Research Academy accolade him with Dr. Anandibai Joshi National Health Award, in 2011. He has a feather in his cap of Certificate of Gratitude by Maharashtra Arogya Mandal Pune for national seminar on Sickle Cell Anaemia, throwing light on his inputs, interest and outstanding support for Sickle Cell Anaemia Research Project in 2015. He received prestigious “ Smita Smruti Puraskar” in 2017, in the memory of actress Padmashree Late Smita Patil. He also has been honoured with Red and White Bravery Award by Godfrey Phillips in recognition of an exceptional act of social courage, in 2002.

== Personal life ==
He and his wife Jaya Ramteke have a son Harshal Ramteke and a daughter Shweta Ramteke. He died in November 2017 due to cardiac arrest.
