= Vaman Kardak =

Marathi poet and playwright (1922–2004)

- Born: 15 August 1922; Deshvandi, Nashik, Bombay Presidency
- Died: 15 May 2004 (aged 81); Nashik, Maharashtra
- Other name: Vamandada Kardak
- Occupations: poet, playwright, humanist

Vaman Tabaji Kardak (15 August 1922 – 15 May 2004), popularly known as Vamandada Kardak, was a Marathi poet and playwright.
