= Namdeo Kamble =

Indian writer

Namdeo Kamble (Padma Shree)
- Born: 1 January 1948 (age 78); Shirpur, Washim district, Maharashtra, India
- Occupations: writer, social worker, journalist and teacher

Namdeo Chandrabhan Kamble (born 1 January 1948, Shirpur-Washim) is an Indian Marathi-language writer, social worker, journalist and teacher. He was awarded the Sahitya Akademi Award in 1995 for his novel Raghav Vel. He was awarded Padma Shri in the field of literature and education in 2021.

Kamble has published twenty-one books, including eight novels, four collections of poems, two collections of short stories and two fine collections, as well as character and ideological texts.

== Books ==
- अकल्पित (कविता संग्रह) Unimaginable (poetry collection)
- अस्पर्श (कादंबरी) Untouchable (novel)
- आपले दादा- दादासाहेब हावरे (चरित्र) Our brother - Dadasaheb Havere (character)
- ऊन सावली (कादंबरी) Woon Saavli (Novel)
- कृष्णार्पण (कादंबरी) Krishnarpan (novel)
- गहिवर (कविता संग्रह) Gahivar (poetry collection)
- गांधी उद्यासाठी (वैचारिक)(+सहलेखक) Gandhi for tomorrow (ideological) (+ co-author)
- झाकोळ (कादंबरी) Zakol (novel)
- तो:ती:अन्वयार्थ (कविता संग्रह) To: Ti: Anvayartha (Collection of Poems)
- परतीबंद (कथा संग्रह) Partiband (story collection)
- प्रत्यय (कविता संग्रह) Suffix (poetry collection)
- बळी (कथासंग्रह) Victim (story collection)
- महात्मा गांधी आणि डाॅ.आंबेडकर : संघर्ष आणि समन्वय (वैचारिक) Mahatma Gandhi and B. R. Ambedkar: Struggle and Coordination (Ideological)
- मोराचे पाय (कादंबरी) Peacock Feet (novel)
- राघव वेळ (कादंबरी) Raghav Vel (Novel)
- शब्दांच्या गावा जावे (भाषणे) Go to the village of words (speeches)
- समरसता साहित्य- स्वरूप व समिक्षा (समिक्षा) Harmony Literature - Format and Review (Review)
- सांजरंग (कादंबरी) Sanjarang (novel)
- सेलझाडा (कादंबरी) Seljhada (novel)
- सिद्धार्थ (ललित-लेख) Siddhartha (Fine Writing)
- स्मरण विस्मरण (लेख संग्रह) Forgetfulness (archive of articles)
