= Headspace (company) =

Online mental health company

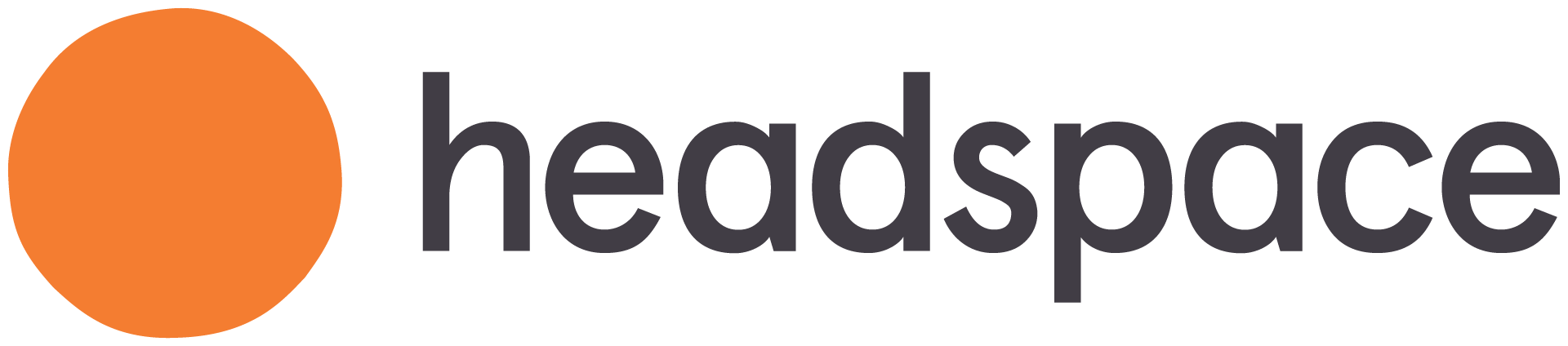
- Type: Private
- Industry: Healthcare
- Genre: Mental health
- Founded: May 2010; 16 years ago in London, England
- Headquarters: 2415 Michigan Avenue, Santa Monica, California, United States
- Number of locations: 3 (2024)
- Area served: Worldwide
- Key people: Tom Pickett (CEO, Board Member); Andy Puddicombe (Headspace Co-Founder); Karan Singh (COO, Ginger Co-Founder); Rich Pierson (Headspace Co-Founder)
- Services: Online therapy Mental health coaching Guided meditation and mindfulness
- Revenue: 100+ million
- Number of employees: 1000+
- Parent: Headspace Health
- Website: www.headspace.com

Headspace
- Available in: English, French, German, Portuguese and Spanish

Headspace is a digital mental health company that provides guided meditation, mindfulness, and online therapy services through its mobile app and website. Founded in May 2010 by Andy Puddicombe and Richard Pierson, the company is headquartered in San Francisco, California.

== History ==
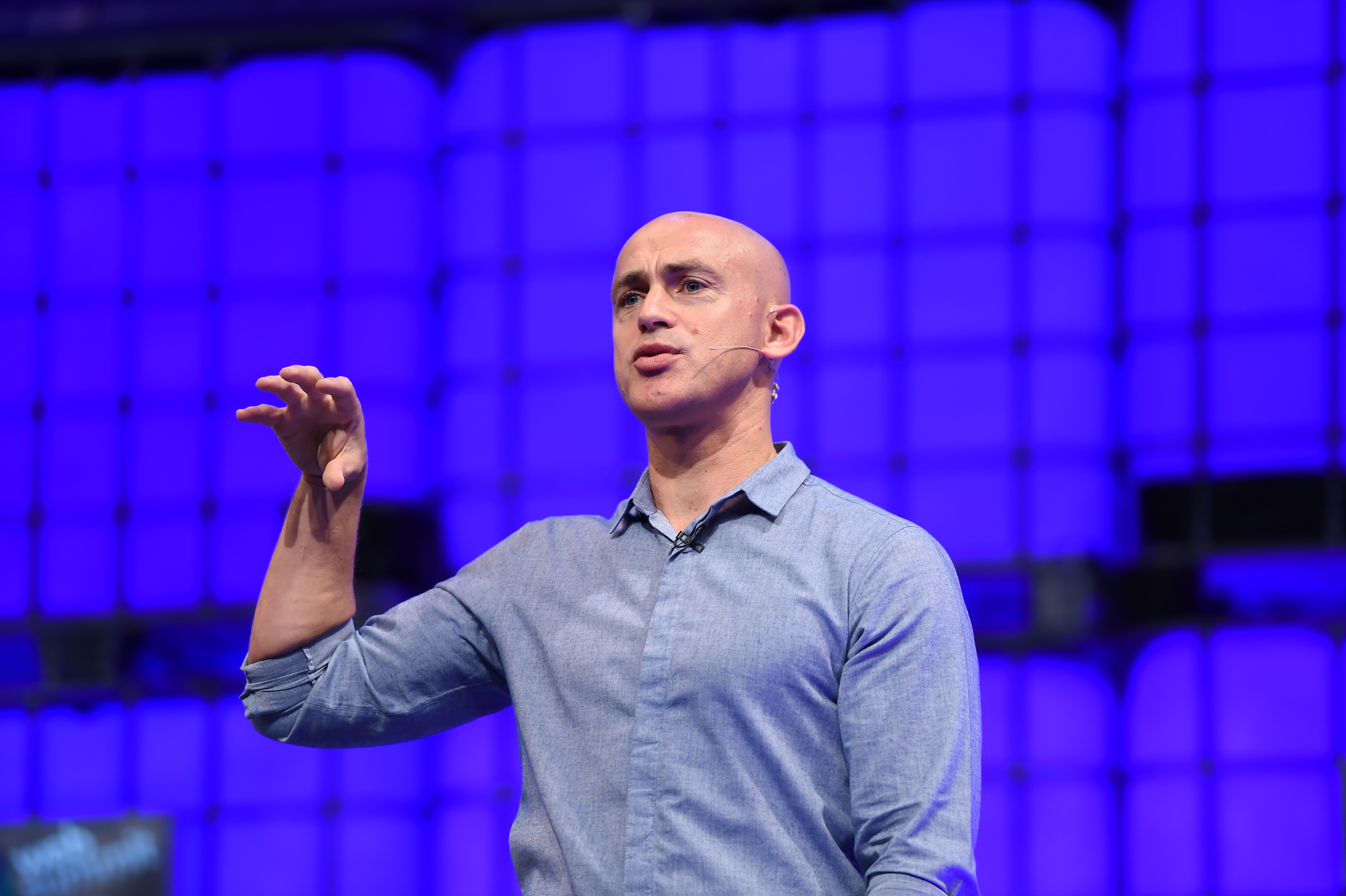
Andy Puddicombe, co-founder of Headspace

Headspace was founded by Richard Pierson and Andy Puddicombe in May 2010.

The company organized mindfulness events and sold meditation CDs before launching its mobile application in 2012.

In 2018, Headspace introduced Headspace Health, a subsidiary. The company began clinical trials to obtain FDA approval for its first digital health product. Beginning in October 2023, the company discontinued use of the name Headspace Health and began referring to itself solely as Headspace.

In January 2021, Puddicombe and Pierson stepped back from day-to-day leadership while remaining on the Board. In August 2021, Headspace merged with Ginger, an online mental health platform, creating a combined entity valued at $3 billion. The merger aimed to provide comprehensive mental health services, including therapy and coaching.

Following the merger, former Ginger CEO Russell Glass became CEO of Headspace. In May 2022, Puddicombe and Pierson left the Board entirely. In July 2023, former Headspace therapists affected by a round of layoffs accused the company of canceling patient appointments and severing relationships with clinicians without advanced notice, violating ethical standards of care.

In August 2024, Tom Pickett was appointed as CEO and given a seat on Headspace's board of directors.

== Products and services ==
=== Meditation and mindfulness ===
Headspace offers guided meditation sessions through its mobile app and website. The app provides content in areas such as health, performance, relationships, and sleep. Notable collaborations include:

- Star Wars Mindfulness Series (April 2022): A series featuring characters from the Star Wars franchise, guided by Headspace instructor Samantha Snowden.
- Shine Acquisition (September 2022): Headspace acquired Shine, a mental health and wellness platform focused on inclusive mental healthcare, integrating its content into the Headspace platform.
- The Mindful Adventures of Unicorn Island (September 2023): An animated series for children, co-created with Lilly Singh and YouTube TV, teaching mindfulness-based emotional regulation skills.
- Headspace XR (March 2024): A virtual reality mindfulness game for Meta Quest, developed in collaboration with Nexus Studios.
- CoComelon (October 2025): Headspace partnered with Cocomelon to produce a podcast designed to help young children establish bedtime routines through guided movement, breathing, and mindfulness exercises.

=== Coaching and therapy ===
Following the merger with Ginger, Headspace offers mental health coaching and therapy services under the brand Headspace Care. In November 2023, the platform introduced its first clinically focused program, Finding Your Best Sleep.

== Research ==
Headspace has been used on clinical trials investigating the effects of mindfulness training. In one such study, researchers from University College London (UCL), funded by the British Heart Foundation, examined the impact of mindfulness on workplace stress in two major multinational corporations, using the Headspace app as the intervention. Clinical studies have also found that Headspace is beneficial in helping people to sleep better. By 2022, the platform had participated in more than 90 research projects with partnering research institutions.

== Netflix shows ==
Poster for Headspace Guide to Meditation

Headspace signed a three-series deal with Netflix. The first series, Headspace Guide to Meditation was released in January 2021 with Headspace Guide to Sleep released in April 2021. The third title, Unwind Your Mind, was released in June 2021.

== Media attention ==
Headspace has appeared on The Today Show, BBC Breakfast News, ABC News, and The Dr. Oz Show. It was also featured on the BBC Two science documentary Horizon, which tested the efficacy of mindfulness using the Headspace app over 8 weeks.
