= Chicago Zen Center =

Buddhist temple in Evanston, Illinois

Coordinates: 42.0551°N 87.6869°W

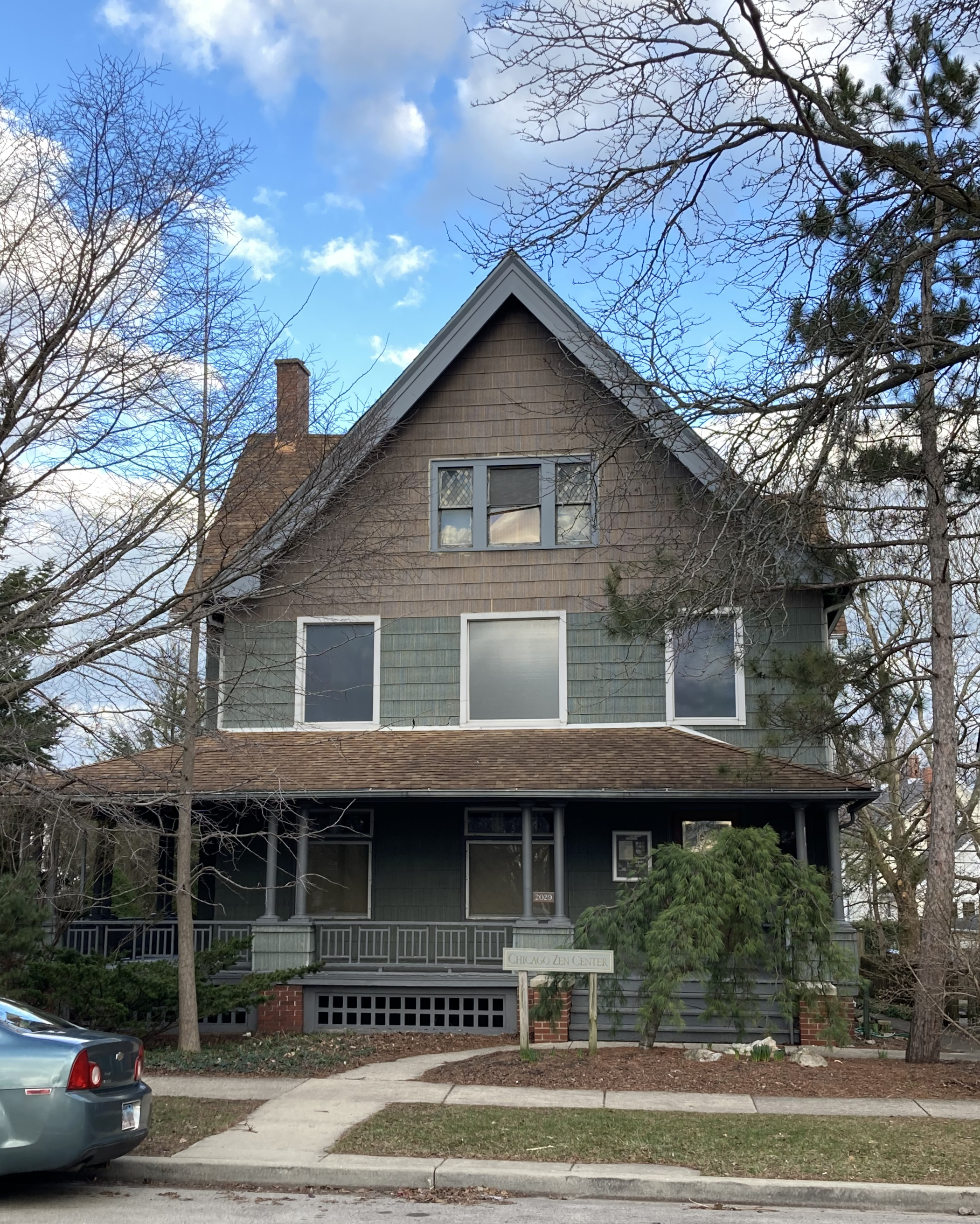

Religion
- Affiliation: Zen Buddhist

Location
- Location: 2029 Ridge Ave, Evanston, Illinois 60201
- Country: United States
- Interactive map of Chicago Zen Center

Architecture
- Founder: Philip Kapleau
- Completed: 1974

Website
- www.chicagozen.org

The Chicago Zen Center (CZC) is a Harada-Yasutani Zen practice center located in Evanston, Illinois near Northwestern University currently led by Abbot Shodhin Geiman.

Established in 1974, the Chicago Zen Center formed around an interested group of students who had attended a workshop given by Philip Kapleau in the early 1970s. For many years, the center was an affiliate of the Rochester Zen Center in Rochester New York, which sent teachers there throughout the year to hold sesshins, including Kapleau himself as well as his successor Bodhin Kjolhede.

Chicago Zen Center has been independent of Rochester Zen Center since 1997 although it has maintained close ties. The center's first resident teacher was Sevan Ross who trained at Rochester Zen Center and became abbot of Chicago Zen Center from 1997 to 2010. Ross was succeeded as abbot by Yusan Graham. In 2023, Yusan retired and designated Shodhin as his successor.

== See also ==
- Buddhism in the United States
- Timeline of Zen Buddhism in the United States
