= Ralph Chapin =

- Born: July 3, 1915
- Died: August 8, 2000 (aged 85)
- Known for: Contributions to Rochester Zen Center. One of the first Zen practitioners in the U.S.
- Title: Chairman / Treasurer
- Board member of: Board of R.E. Chapin Works
- Website: http://www.chapinmfg.com

Ralph Baldwin Chapin (July 3, 1915 – August 8, 2000) was a member of Rochester Zen Center and one of the earliest American Zen practitioners.

== Biography ==
He was born in Batavia, New York. He graduated from the MIT Sloan School of Management in 1937 with a degree in Business Administration and Mechanical Engineering. He also had business dealings in Hong Kong making flashlights.

In 1945 Ralph returned to Batavia and with his family they settled into the Mill House and began a long-term project to rehabilitate the buildings and grounds. They set up a company, the R. E. Chapin Manufacturing Works, Inc., which Ralph joined and where he held the position of Chairman and Treasurer.

in 1965 he met Philip Kapleau in Japan shortly before the publication of his seminal book, The Three Pillars of Zen. He introduced this book as well as Roshi Kapleau to Dorris and Chester Carlson, whose Rochester meditation group later formed the bases of the Rochester Zen Center.

== Historical significance ==
He was Sangha member of the Rochester Zen Center which he had joined in 1965. Longtime friend of Philip Kapleau.

He was notable for his continued donations to the fledgling center in the 1960s. In 1996 there was the Zen Center's 30th anniversary and on this occasion, Ralph Chapin donated Chapin Mill to the Center.

In a letter to the Center's members he told that, “This is all an accumulation of years of thinking about how Chapin Mill could be used by the Center to continue building a strong and active Sangha, a strengthened transmission of Zen teaching, and the potential for a larger community to benefit from the many levels of Zen practice.” The center immediately broke ground for the retreat center. In 2007 the zendo was finally completed and regular sesshin are held there.

== R.E. Chapin Manufacturing Works ==
Founded by his grandfather R. E. Chapin in 1884, the company originally started in the back of a hardware store in Oakfield, New York, producing kerosene oil storage containers for oil lamps. Early in the 1900s, after relocating to Batavia, the company began producing hand-operated garden sprayers, and today builds household, industrial and professional sprayers for worldwide distribution.

== See also ==
- Timeline of Zen Buddhism in the United States
- Chapin Mill Buddhist Retreat Center
