= Kanja Odland =

Swedish Zen Buddhist teacher

- Title: Roshi

Personal life
- Born: 1963 (age 62–63) Stockholm
- Spouse: Sante Poromaa

Religious life
- Religion: Zen Buddhism
- School: Sōtō and Rinzai
- Lineage: Philip Kapleau

Senior posting
- Based in: Zengården
- Website: www.zentraining.org

Kanja Odland (born 1963) is a Swedish Zen Buddhist teacher (Roshi) and priest in the tradition of Philip Kapleau and Bodhin Kjolhede. Together with her co-teacher Sante Poromaa Roshi, she leads Zenbuddhistiska Samfundet, one of the major traditions of Zen Buddhism in Sweden with centers in several European countries. (Note: There are two major traditions of Zen Buddhism catering to converts in Sweden. Firstly, Zenbuddhistiska Samfundet, founded in 1982, also stemming from Sanbō Kyōdan through the tradition of the American teacher Philip Kapleau (1912–2004). It has a training temple, Zengården, at Fellingsbro, and urban meditation centres in Stockholm, Gotheburg, Lund, Tampere (Finland), Cologne (Germany), and Glasgow (Scotland).)

== Zen training ==
Odland started her Zen training in 1984 and became a student of both Roshi Philip Kapleau and his successor Roshi Bodhin Kjolhede at Rochester Zen Center. She was ordained as a priest in 1999. She is authorized as an independent teacher (Roshi) having "received dharma transmission in the 'Cloud-Water Sangha' lineage," which made her the first female zen teacher from Sweden.

== Work and teaching ==
Since 2001, Odland has been teaching full time at Zengården, Zenbuddhistiska Samfundet's training temple in Fellingsbro in rural Sweden. ZBS also has centers in Stockholm, Gothenburg, Lund, Tampere (Finland), Cologne (Germany) and Glasgow (Scotland). The association has approximately 500 members and is a member organisation in the Swedish Buddhist Community.

Odland regularly offers sesshin (meditation retreats) in English and gives public talks on Zen. She is active in contemporary Swedish intellectual and cultural life.

Her first book Vandring på Spårlös Stig was published in 2013, and she has written various articles on Zen, including a commentary on the mu-koan published in Zen Bow magazine.

== Lineage ==
Odland and Poromaa have sanctioned five of their students as Zen teachers: Karl Kaliski Sensei, Sangen Salo Sensei, Dharman Ödman Sensei, Mitra Virtaperko Sensei, and Kansan Zetterberg Sensei.

== Bibliography ==
- Vandring på spårlös stig : en zenutövares anteckningar (Fellingsbro: Zendo, 2013) ISBN 9789197785747

== Galleries ==
=== Zengården ===
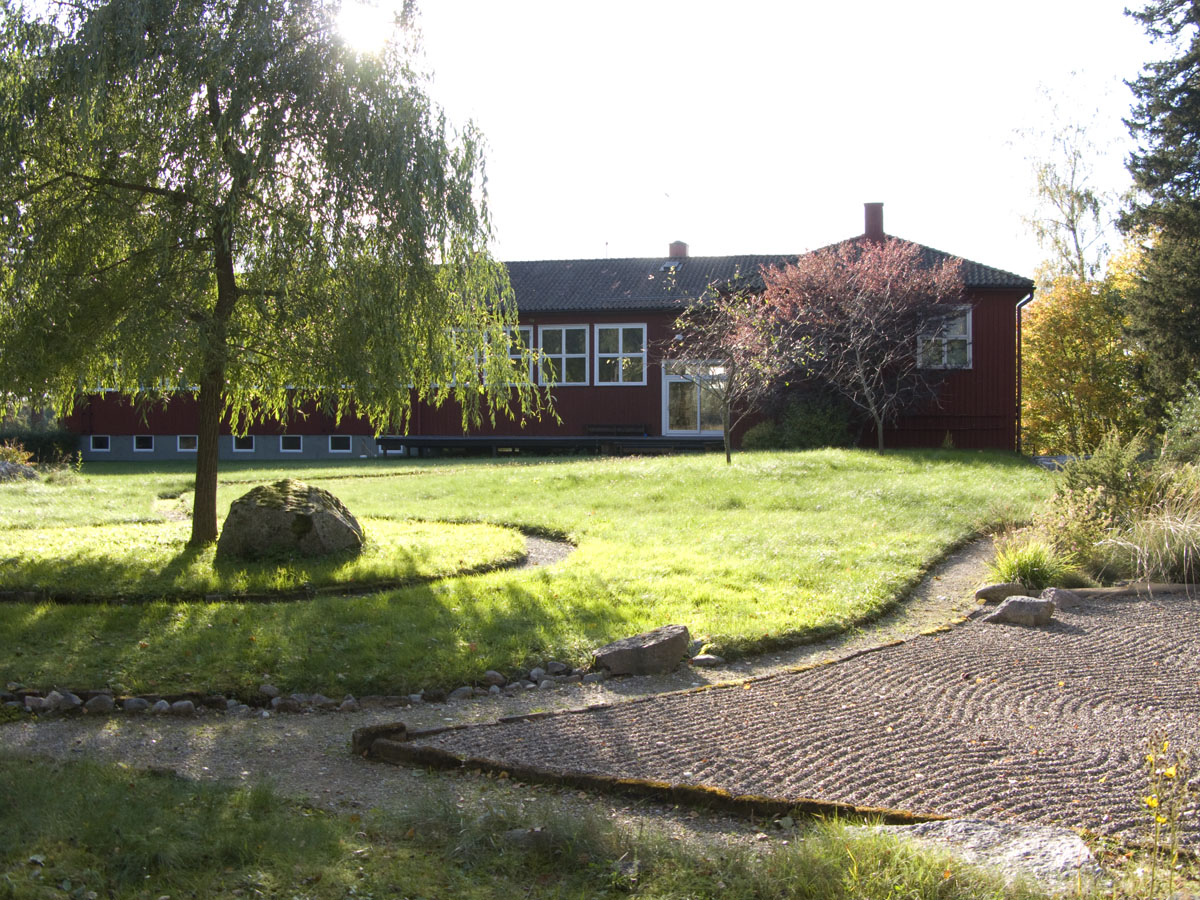

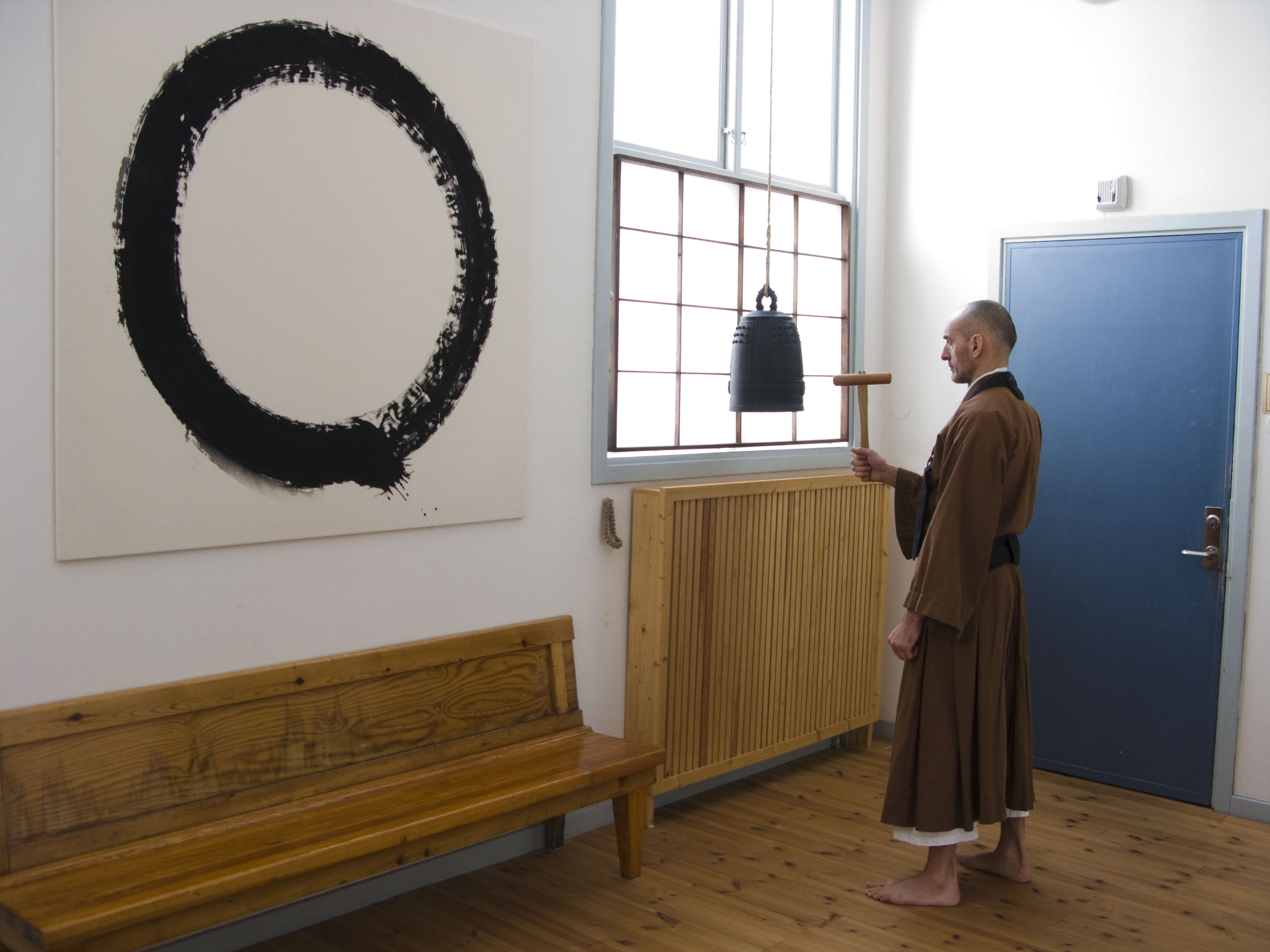

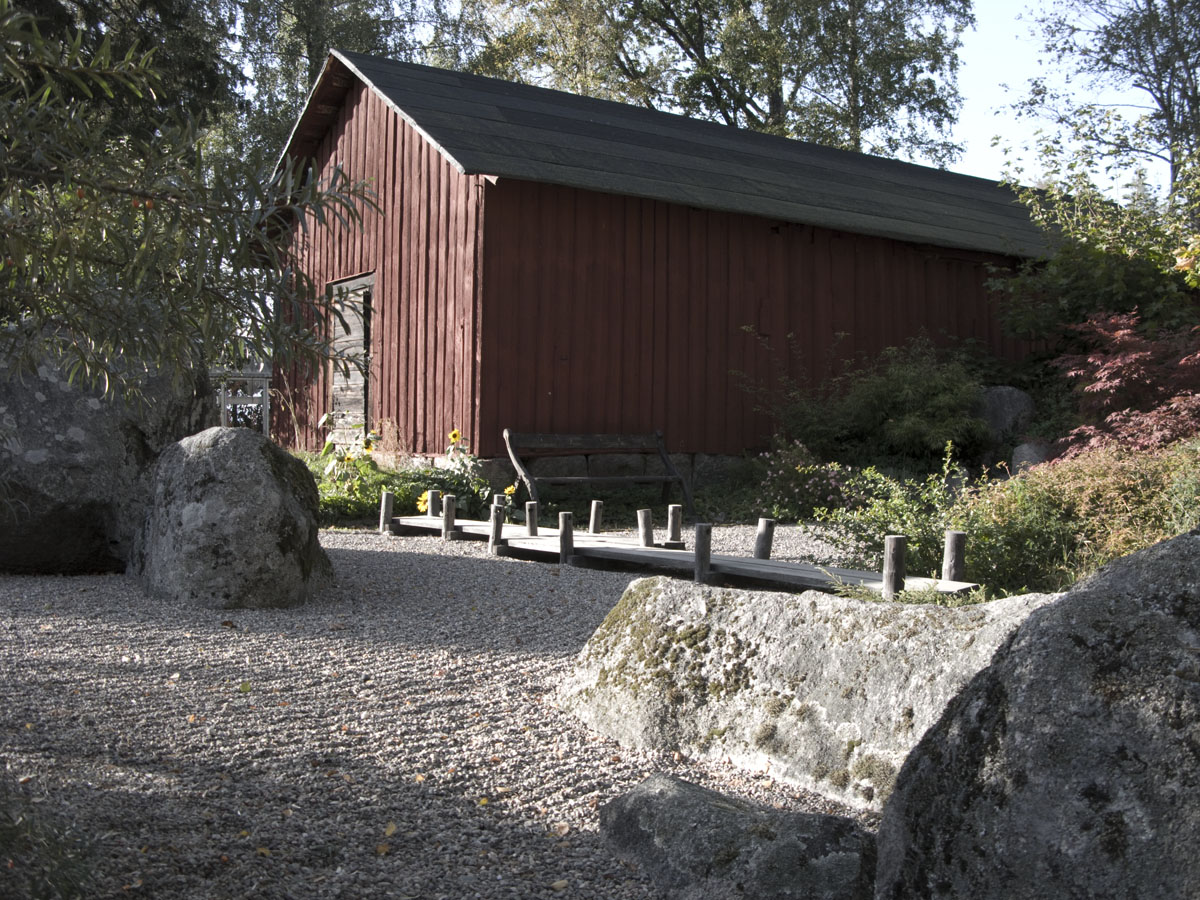

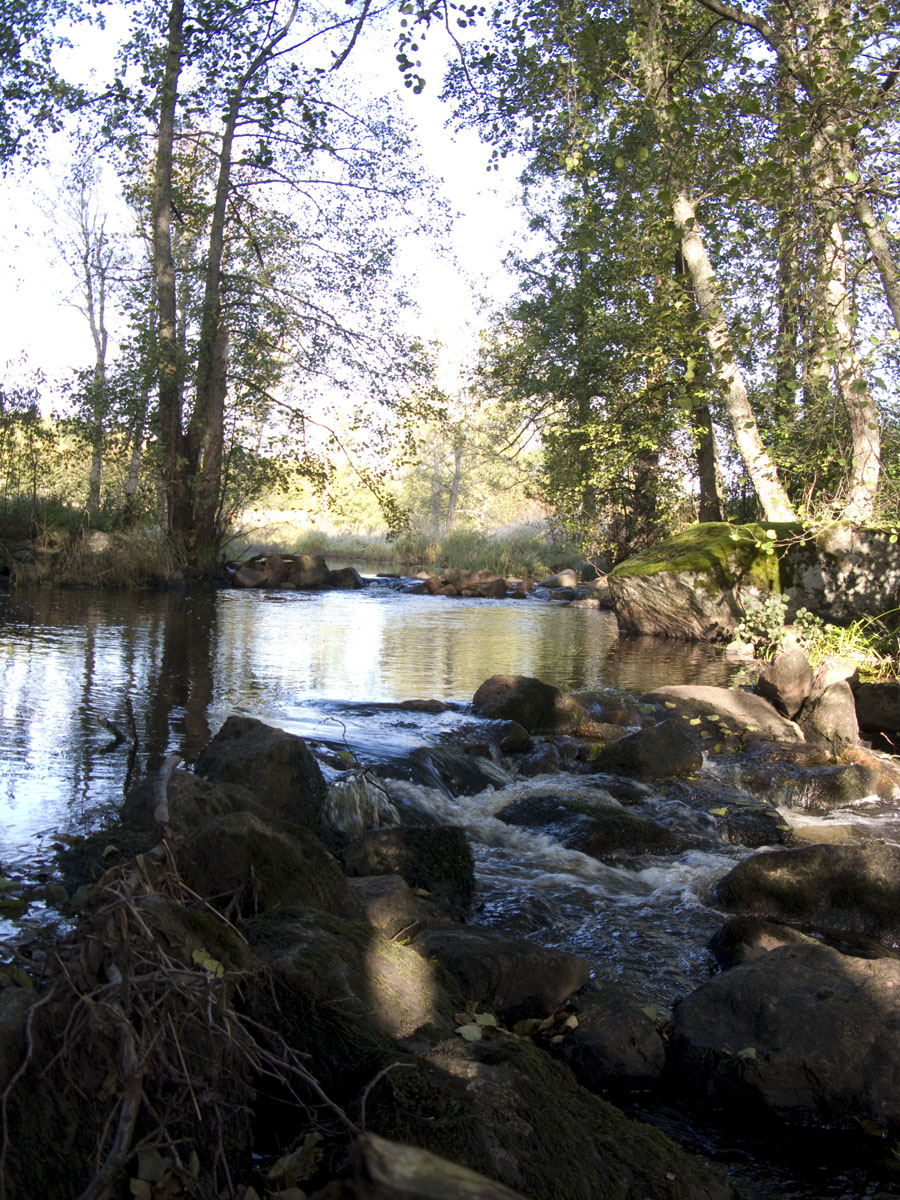

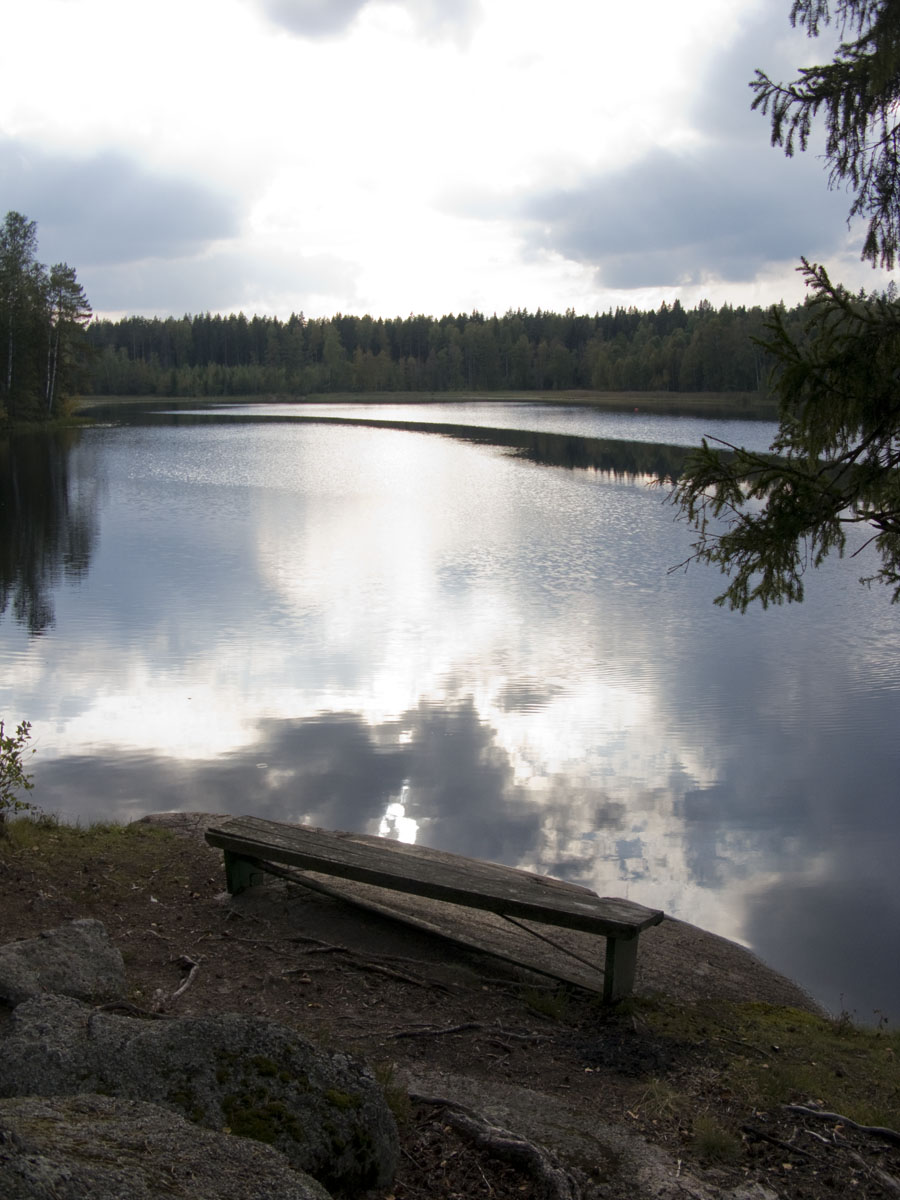

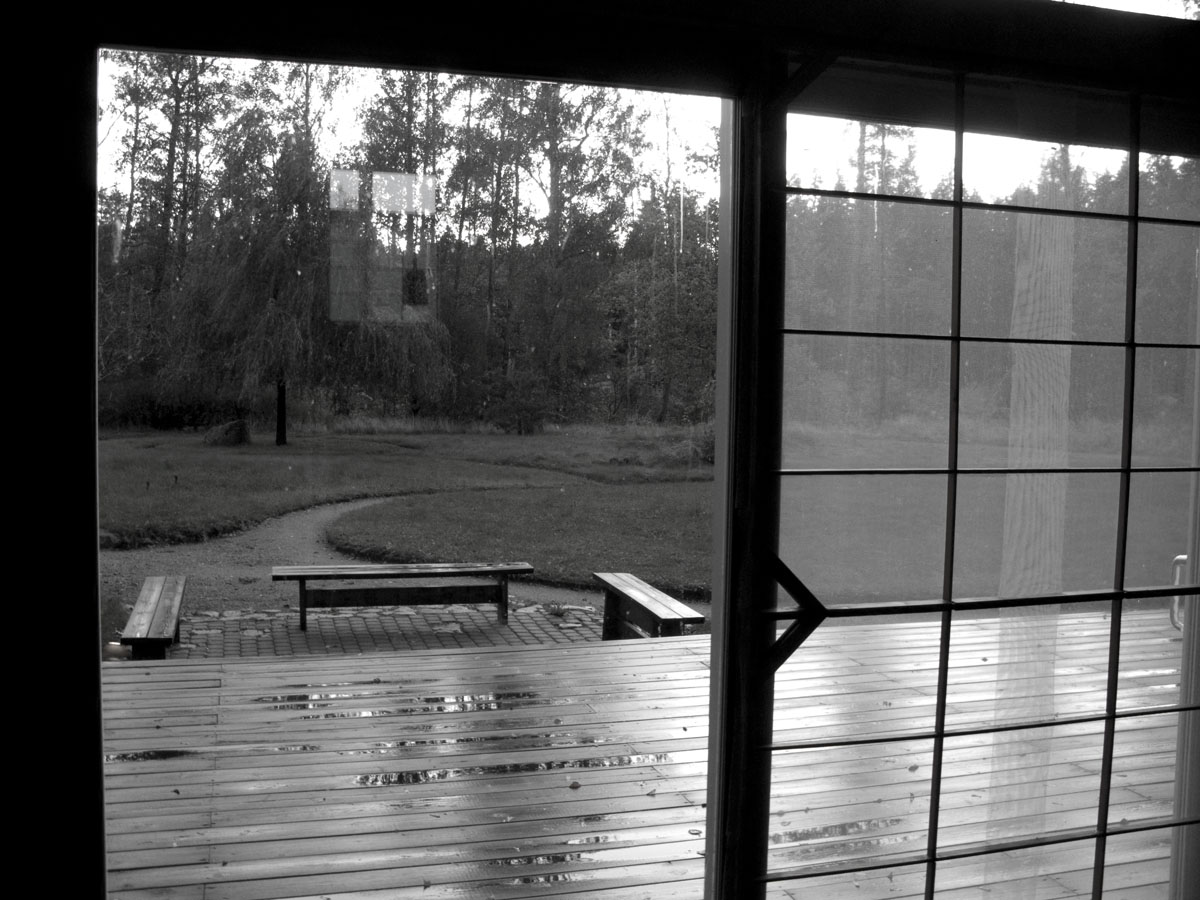

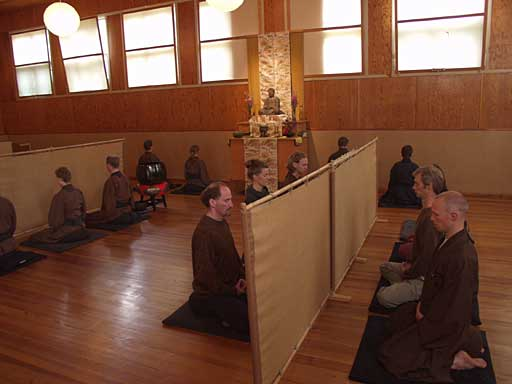
