= Sante Poromaa =

Swedish Zen Buddhist teacher

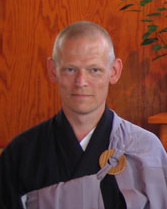
- Title: Roshi

Personal life
- Born: 1958 (age 67–68) Kiruna, Sweden
- Spouse: Kanja Odland

Religious life
- Religion: Zen Buddhism
- School: Sōtō and Rinzai
- Lineage: Philip Kapleau

Senior posting
- Based in: Zengården
- Website: www.zentraining.org

Sante Poromaa Roshi (born 1958) is a Swedish Zen Buddhist teacher (Roshi) in the tradition of Philip Kapleau and Bodhin Kjolhede. He was born in 1958 in Kiruna, Sweden. Together with his co-teacher Kanja Odland Roshi, he leads Zenbuddhistiska Samfundet, one of the major traditions of Zen Buddhism in Sweden with centers in several European countries.

== Zen training ==
He commenced his Zen training in the early eighties as a student of Philip Kapleau. When Roshi Kapleau went into semi-retirement, he also became a student of Kapleau's successor, Roshi Bodhin Kjolhede. Poromaa was ordained as a Zen priest in 1991. He finished his formal koan training in 1993. In 1998, he was authorized to teach by Roshi Kjolhede, and has been teaching full-time since then. He is authorized as an independent teacher (Roshi) in the “Cloud-Water Sangha” lineage.

== Work and teaching ==
Poromaa and Odland jointly lead Zenbuddhistiska Samfundet from Zengården, Zenbuddhistiska Samfundet's training temple in Fellingsbro in rural Sweden. ZBS also has centers in Stockholm, Gothenburg, Lund, Tampere (Finland), Cologne (Germany) and Glasgow (Scotland). Zenbuddhistiska Samfundet has approximately 500 members and is a member organisation in the Swedish Buddhist Community, which he was involved in founding in 1992.

Poromaa offers regular sesshin (meditation retreats) at Zengården, in English. He also gives public talks on Zen and contributes to Swedish public life through participation in panel discussions on current social, philosophical and religious issues.

Although an artist by training, Poromaa has had a lifelong interest in science. His investigations of the possibility of finding common ground between the Buddhist and scientific worldviews led to the publication in 2009 of his book “The Net of Indra – Rebirth in Science and Buddhism”.

== Lineage ==
Poromaa and Odland have sanctioned five of their students as Zen teachers: Karl Kaliski Sensei, Sangen Salo Sensei, Dharman Ödman Sensei, Mitra Virtaperko Sensei och Kansan Zetterberg Sensei.

== Bibliography ==
English

- The Net of Indra (Fellingsbro: Zendo, 2009) ISBN 9789197785716
- The Eightfold Path in Zen (Fellingsbro: Zendo, 2016) ISBN 9789198306514
- It's Never Too Late — To Give Up (Fellingsbro: Zendo, 2019) ISBN 978-9198306521

Swedish

- Bortom alla begrepp: Buddhas väg till frihet (Hägersten : Red Dot Publ, 1997) ISBN 9789197260510
- Varandets Väv (Fellingsbro: Zendo, 2008) ISBN 9789197785709
