= Claire Myers Owens =

American writer (1896–1983)

- Born: Clairene Lenora Allen Myers; February 11, 1896; Rockdale, Texas, U.S.
- Died: May 7, 1983 (aged 87)
- Resting place: Rochester Zen Center
- Alma mater: College of Industrial Arts (now Texas Woman's University)
- Occupations: Author, writer
- Writing career
- Pen name: Claire Myers Spotswood

Claire Myers Owens (1896–1983) was an American novelist, essayist, and poet. She wrote a novel and several autobiographical books about spirituality and her experiences with Zen Buddhism. Her 1935 novel The Unpredictable Adventure was an allegory for how society treats women and was banned by the New York Public Library for being "too risque". Following a spiritual awakening she wrote the 1958 book Awakening to the Good, which praised by figures within the Human Potential Movement. Later in her life she studied Zen Buddhism and was involved with the Rochester Zen Center in New York. A native of Texas, she attended the College of Industrial Arts (now Texas Woman's University), graduating in 1913.

== Early life and education ==
Clairene Lenora Allen Myers was born on February 11, 1896, in Rockdale, Texas, to Susan and Coren Lee Myers. Her father was a principal at Troy High School in Troy. Their family moved to Temple where Clairene graduated from Temple High School in 1913.

While she aspired to study philosophy and psychology at the University of Texas at Austin, her father preferred that she learn to cook and sew at the College of Industrial Arts in Denton. She earned her bachelor's degree in domestic science from the college (now the Texas Woman's University) in 1916.

== Career ==
After graduating from college, Claire wanted to "save the world overnight". She moved to Alabama where she worked as a social worker in a mining camp and taught kindergarten classes. Her parents were displeased with her choice and disinherited her. In 1918, Claire moved to an intentional community in Virginia's Blue Ridge Mountains.

During the 1920s she lived in New York where she was employed as a writer and worked at book stores. She became acquainted with published authors and penned reviews for Publishers Weekly.

In 1935 she published the novel The Unpredictable Adventure: A Comedy of Woman's Independence under the pen name Claire Myers Spotswood. The allegorical book describes a utopia where a young woman escapes from her home and travels to the land of 'Nithking'. The work satirized cultural norms and was critical of a societal double standard which, according to her, "divides a woman against herself". The Unpredictable Adventure was banned by the New York Public Library for being "too risque". While she was contracted with Doubleday to write an additional seven fantasy adventure sequels, she never did.

Owens continued writing, producing short stories, essays, and poetry. She had a column in Today's Woman in the 1940s. She was friends with novelist Thomas Wolfe. She later wrote a short story about their relationship and denied rumors that she had had an affair with him.

Owens experienced a spiritual awakening in 1949 and began to study psychology, especially the works of Carl Jung. She published her second book in 1958, Awakening to the Good: Psychological Or Religious?, which described her spiritual experience. It was praised by pioneers of the Human Potential Movement. She became influential within the humanistic psychology movement and earned the respect of Aldous Huxley and Abraham Maslow.

Following the death of her husband in 1969, Owens invited students from Yale University to her home to study Zen Buddhism and meditate. She then sold her home and moved to Rochester, New York, where she became involved with the Rochester Zen Center, learning from Philip Kapleau. Her 1979 book Zen and the Lady is about her experiences there.

Owens died on May 7, 1983. At the time of her death, she was working on a book entitled Meditation and the Lady. Her remains were buried in the garden of the Rochester Zen Center, underneath a tree.

== Personal life and legacy ==
Claire Myers had a unconsummated common law marriage with Leo Saidla while she lived at the intentional community in 1918. She married New York Herald Tribune financial columnist George Wanders in 1931. This marriage fell apart quickly but she did not secure a divorce until she moved to Reno in 1936. Claire married the banker Harry Thurston Owens in 1937 and moved to New Haven, Connecticut.

Texas Woman's University holds Owens' papers as part of their special collections. The 2019 book Rivers of Light: The Life of Claire Myers Owens by Miriam Kalman Friedman concerns the life of Owens.

== Works ==
- The Unpredictable Adventure: A Comedy of Woman's Independence (1935)
- Love is Not Enough (1958)
- Awakening to the Good: Psychological Or Religious? (1958)
- Discovery of Self (1963)
- Zen and the Lady (1979)
