= Albert Low =

Western Zen master and author (1928–2016)

- Title: Zen Master

Personal life
- Born: December 16, 1928 London, England
- Died: January 29, 2016 (aged 87) Montreal, Quebec, Canada

Religious life
- Religion: Zen Buddhism
- School: Sanbo Kyodan, Philip Kapleau
- Lineage: Philip Kapleau

Albert William Low (1928–2016) was a Western Zen master in the Philip Kapleau-lineage, an internationally published author, and a former human resources executive. He lived in England, South Africa, Canada, and the United States and resided in Montreal since 1979. He held a BA degree in Philosophy and Psychology, and was a trained counselor. In 2003, he was awarded an honorary degree of Doctor of Laws for scholastic attainment and community service by Queen's University, in Kingston, Ontario.

== Biography ==
Dr. Low was born in London, England, on December 16, 1928. During the period of 1947–1949, he served two years in the Royal Navy. He left England with his wife Jean in 1954, and emigrated to South Africa. There he was employed by the Central News Agency, a company that held the monopoly for the sale and distribution of all reading matter including books, magazines, and newspapers throughout Southern Africa, which then included South Africa, Rhodesia, Mozambique, and South West Africa. Eventually, he became the senior personnel executive and reported to the CEO. During this time, he gave many seminars on creativity and organization for managers at all levels for the National Development Foundation of South Africa. While in South Africa, his children Anita, John and Stephen were born.

In 1963, he left South Africa as he could not agree with the political policy of apartheid, and moved to Canada. He settled in Chatham-Kent, Ontario, and was again employed as a personnel executive, this time with a large utility that was at that time called the Union Gas Company. He was in charge of salary administration for all levels of the company, as well as for organization and staffing. He developed an original theory on creativity, organization and management. Eventually, he wrote a book based upon his researches: Zen and Creative Management, which has since sold more than 75,000 copies. During his time at the gas company, he continued to give talks and seminars on the subject of management, organization and creativity — the latter a subject he has spent considerable time studying, and which is very closely connected with Zen practice.

In 1955, he became interested in Zen Buddhism, and had a strong intellectual interest for about ten years.

In 1966, he met the Japanese Zen Master Haku'un Yasutani and practiced Zen, first with him, and then for twenty years with Philip Kapleau, who had himself been a disciple of Yasutani's until the latter dissolved their relationship. In 1976, he resigned from the Gas Company and went to the Rochester Zen Center for three years, where he served as editor of the Center's journal. In 1979, he relocated to Montreal as a probationary teacher. In 1986, he finished his training and was authorized by Kapleau to teach as a Zen master.

Dr. Low made a study of human nature throughout his life. He drew on his prolonged meditations on creativity and the human condition, his many years of providing psychological and spiritual counseling, and a wide-ranging knowledge of Western psychology, philosophy, and science — including a deep interest in evolutionary theory. He gave many talks on CBC Radio and CBC Television.

Dr. Low wrote eleven books, and contributed to three. Many of his books have been translated into three or more languages. He also translated Dr. Hubert Benoit's Let Go! and Thich Nhat Hanh's Zen Keys from French to English. His final book, The Origin of Human Nature: a Zen Buddhist Looks at Evolution, was recently published by Sussex Academic Press.

Albert Low was the rōshi and director at the Montreal Zen Center with over two hundred students, whom he counseled on both spiritual and psychological issues. He died on January 29, 2016 in Montreal, Canada.

== Selected works ==
- The Iron Cow of Zen (Theosophical Publishing House, 1984) ISBN 0-8356-0598-1
- Invitation To Practice Zen (Charles E. Tuttle Company, Tokyo, 1989) ISBN 0-8048-1598-4
- The Butterfly's Dream (Charles E. Tuttle Company, Vermont) ISBN 0-8048-1822-3
- Zen and Creative Management (Charles E. Tuttle Company, Tokyo, 1992) ISBN 0-8048-1883-5
- The World A Gateway: Commentaries on the Mumonkan (Charles E. Tuttle Company of Vermont, 1995) ISBN 0-8048-3046-0
- To Know Yourself (Charles E. Tuttle Company, 1997) ISBN 0-8048-3119-X
- Creating Consciousness (White Cloud Press, 2001) ISBN 1-883991-39-0
- Zen and the Sutras (Charles E. Tuttle Company, 2000) ISBN 0-8048-3201-3
- Hakuin Zenji's Chant in Praise of Zazen (Zen Books, 2004)
- Hakuin on Kensho (Shambhala Publications, 2006) ISBN 1-59030-377-6
- The Origin of Human Nature, A Zen Buddhist Looks at Evolution (Sussex Academic Press, 2008) ISBN 978-1-84519-260-0
- Conflict and Creativity at Work, Human Roots of Corporate Life (Sussex Academic Press, 2008) ISBN 978-1-84519-272-3
- What am I? The Heart Sutra for Everyone (iUniverse, 2010) ISBN 978-1-4502-3068-1
- What More Do You Want? Zen Questions, Zen Answers (Tuttle Publishing, 2013) ISBN 978-0-8048-4364-5

== Articles and papers ==
- Master Hakuin's Gateway To Freedom in Zen Tradition and Transition: a Source book by Contemporary Zen Masters and Scholars edited by Kenneth Kraft and published by Grove Press
- The Power of Prayer published by New World Library, Novato
