= CZC =

CZC may refer to

- Cambridge Zen Center
- Chicago Zen Center
- Mitsubishi Colt CZC
