= Yaza =

Zen Buddhist term for a sitting time

A typical zendo where Yaza is performed. This one is at Chapin Mill

Yaza is a Zen Buddhist term for a sitting time during sesshin that is above and beyond the normal daily routine. It is generally encouraged because it is said to be more difficult to sit at this time when your body is exhausted from the entire day's routine.

== How to do Yaza ==
While most Yaza is performed after the last evening sitting, some is done early in the morning. If the practitioner is too tired to go on at night they can get up a few hours early in the morning.
