= Toronto Zen Centre =

Sanbo Kyodan Zen Buddhist practice center

Toronto Zen Center

Religion
- Affiliation: Sanbo Kyodan

Location
- Location: 33 High Park Gardens; Toronto, Ontario, Canada; M6R 1S8

Architecture
- Founder: Philip Kapleau
- Completed: 1972

Website
- http://www.torontozen.org

The Toronto Zen Centre (or, Toronto Zen Center), is a Sanbo Kyodan Zen Buddhist practice center in Toronto, Ontario, Canada. It is modeled after the Rochester Zen Center. They offer introductory workshops in Zen Buddhism, as well as courses in Buddhist Loving Kindness Meditation and Mastering Breath Awareness (MBA).

== Foundation ==
Founded initially by Philip Kapleau in 1972 as the Toronto Buddhist Centre, the center went on to eventually be incorporated as the Toronto Zen Centre in 1986. Currently the abbot of the Vermont Zen Center - Sensei Sunyana Graef (Dharma heir of Philip Kapleau) is directing the centre's spiritual path while Sensei Taigen Henderson is the Abbot or Roshi of the centre.

== See also ==
- Buddhism in Canada
- Timeline of Zen Buddhism in the United States
- Zen Center
