= Sevan Ross =

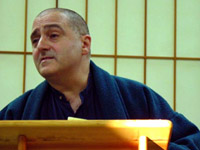
- Title: Priest

Personal life
- Born: 1951 (age 74–75) New Kensington, Pennsylvania, United States
- Occupation: Abbot

Religious life
- Religion: Zen Buddhism
- School: Sōtō and Rinzai
- Lineage: Harada–Yasutani

Senior posting
- Based in: Chicago Zen Center
- Successor: Yusan Graham
- Students: Shodhin Geiman

Sevan Ross (born 1951) is a Zen Buddhist priest and teacher with training backgrounds in both the Sōtō and Rinzai traditions in the Harada-Yasutani lineage. He is the former abbot and spiritual director of the Chicago Zen Center in Evanston, IL.

Ross was sanctioned as a Zen teacher by Bodhin Kjolhede, who was dharma successor of Philip Kapleau. Ross additionally trained with Toni Packer and James Ford in the lineage of Robert Aitkin. In 2007, he was given dharma transmission by Ford Roshi, who himself holds dharma transmission in both the Aitkin lineage and Jiyu Kennett (Sōtō) lineage.

Ross is an advocate of vegetarianism.

His successor as abbot of Chicago Zen Center was Yusan Graham.

== See also ==
- Timeline of Zen Buddhism in the United States
