= Hubert Benoit (psychotherapist) =

French psychotherapist

- Born: March 21, 1904; Nancy, France
- Died: October 28, 1992 (aged 88); Paris, France
- Occupation: Psychotherapist

Hubert Benoit (1904–1992) was a 20th-century French psychotherapist whose work foreshadowed subsequent developments in integral psychology and integral spirituality. His special interest and contribution lay in developing a pioneering form of psychotherapy which integrated a psychoanalytic perspective with insights derived from Eastern spiritual disciplines, in particular from Ch'an and Zen Buddhism. He stressed the part played by the spiritual ignorance of Western culture in the emergence and persistence of much underlying distress. He used concepts derived from psychoanalysis to explain the defences against this fundamental unease, and emphasised the importance of an analytic, preparatory phase, while warning against what he regarded as the psychoanalytic overemphasis on specific causal precursors of symptomatology. He demonstrated parallels between aspects of Zen training and the experience of psychoanalysis. He constructed an account in contemporary psychological terms of the crucial Zen concept of satori and its emergence in the individual.

== Early life and career ==
Hubert Benoit was born in Nancy on 21 March 1904 and died in Paris on 28 October 1992. He trained as a doctor in Paris, where he qualified in 1935 and subsequently specialised in surgery until 1944. In 1944 he sustained severe injuries during the Allied bombardment of Saint-Lô after the Normandy landings. He underwent several operations over the next four years, but was left with a partially paralysed right hand and could no longer work as a surgeon,

During his long convalescence, he extended his pre-existing interest in psychoanalysis and in Oriental spirituality. In his introduction to Métaphysique et Psychanalyse he expressed his conviction that a higher truth existed which was potentially attainable:

'When I was about 30, through the works of René Guénon in particular, I developed an awareness and appreciation of the validity of evidence attainable through the intellect. I came to realise that there is an impersonal and non-individual kind of truth which exists beyond the systems of thought produced by individual philosophers. It became clear to me that each one of us had to re-discover this truth as a concrete, lived reality, and that this was to be achieved through inner work. This was work which the individual alone could carry out'.

Benoit's studies led him to the Vedanta and Taoism as well as Zen Buddhism. He was also acquainted with the work of Gurdjieff.

== Psychotherapy ==
Benoit began his work in Paris as a psychotherapist in 1952. His Métaphysique et Psychanalyse had been published in 1949 and his best known book on Zen Buddhism, La Doctrine Suprême was published in two volumes in 1951 and 1952. In 1952 he also published Le Non-Mental Selon La Pensée Zen, his translation of The Zen Doctrine of No-Mind by D. T. Suzuki. (Suzuki had played a leading role in introducing Zen Buddhism to the anglophone world from the late 1920s, but was not well known in France). Despite this association with Zen Buddhism, Benoit preferred to speak of Ch'an rather than Zen Buddhism, considering that the original Chinese version presented a purer form of the teaching. (Benoit 2008, p. 232, footnote).

In his work he stressed the significance of establishing a metaphysical framework within which an intellectual understanding of the human predicament could develop. He wrote:

'Dr Suzuki has said that Zen "detests any form of intellectualism"...But my impression is that enlightenment for the Westerner does require some intellectual input, though kept within strict limits. The ultimate viewpoint, that of reality, is clearly inexpressible; and the teacher would harm the pupil if he let him forget that the whole problem is precisely one of leaping the gap which separates verbal truth from real knowledge. But rational explanation is needed to coax Westerners to the edge of this gap. Zen says, for example,: "There is nothing complicated to do: seeing directly into one's nature is enough." It took me years of reflection before I began to see how this advice could be given substance and put into practice in our inner life.' (Benoit 2008, pp.7,8 footnote)

=== English works ===
Four of Benoit's books were translated into English between 1955 and 1987, the first of these being The Supreme Doctrine. His last major work, Lâcher Prise(1954), was published in English in 1962. After an interval of 25 years, Benoit summarised his views in De La Réalisation Intérieure (1979), to which he added a fourth section in 1984. The first English version was published in 1987. Two of his books, La Doctrine Suprême and De la Réalisation intérieure, remain in print in English. Pierson precedes his account of Benoit's approach with the following comment: "...although his The Supreme Doctrine was widely read and appreciated in many countries, problems with the translation of his later, more comprehensive and conclusive work, Let Go!, must have cost him most of his English-speaking readers."

== Influence ==
=== Aldous Huxley ===
Benoit was brought to the attention of the English-speaking world by Aldous Huxley, a leading exponent of the Perennial Philosophy in the middle decades of the 20th century. Huxley corresponded with Benoit and in 1950 published a translation of Notes in Regard to a Technique of Timeless Realization He had read Métaphysique et Psychanalyse and wrote to Benoit:

'A book like yours foreshadows the arrival, at last, of a true science of the Psychology of man'.

He also provided the preface to the first edition of Benoit's best known book, The Supreme Doctrine, concluding:

'This is a book that should be read by everyone who aspires to know who he is and what he can do to acquire such self-knowledge'.

When Huxley's library was destroyed by fire in 1961, The Supreme Doctrine was among the books that he singled out for replacement

Huxley promoted Benoit's pioneering attempt to integrate Zen and other Eastern teachings into a Western frame of reference, and others followed suit. According to Tim Barrett, Professor of East Asian History at the School of Oriental and African Studies, in his foreword to the 1995 re-issue of Terence Gray's translation, 'The Supreme Doctrine had a considerable impact on Western students of Zen in the two decades following its publication and was widely cited by such writers as Christmas Humphreys, Alan Watts, Heinrich Dumoulin, and Joko Beck.

=== Robert Powell ===
While Huxley promoted The Supreme Doctrine for its discussion of Zen Buddhism from a Western psychological perspective, others highlighted concepts of particular interest. For Robert Powell, a contemporary of Huxley, it was Benoit's approach to existential anxiety. Benoit considered this to be a near-universal, fundamental component of human personality, likening it to an '"inner lawsuit" which is continually being enacted in our subconscious mind.'

'Behind everything we experience there is a debate going on, illusory proceedings where the matter in dispute is our being or our nothingness...of the actual proceedings themselves, which carry on monotonously in the background, we remain unaware.'(The Light of Zen in the West, p. 56)

=== Margaret J. Rioch and Joseph Hart ===
In the 1970s papers by Joseph Hart and Margaret Jeffrey Rioch appeared in academic journals. Both summarised Benoit's ideas. Rioch, a clinical psychologist and early innovator of psychotherapy, was one of the first Western psychologists to be trained in Zen teaching under Benoit in Paris. Rioch's paper was an abbreviated version of a lecture she delivered as part of a course on philosophy at M.I.T. Hart, author of Modern Eclectic Psychotherapy (1983), presented Benoit's work as a contribution to the philosophy of science that humanistic and transpersonal psychologists were attempting to develop.

=== Osho ===
The followers of Osho (Bhagwan Shree Rajneesh) were introduced to Benoit's ideas. In Books That I Have Loved, Osho mentions two of Benoit's books, Let Go and The Supreme Doctrine. Of the former he writes (p. 32):

' It should be on the bookshelf of every meditator. Nobody has written so scientifically and yet so poetically...the best book of the century so far as the West is concerned.'

Referring to The Supreme Doctrine he noted(p. 39):

'It is rare that a man, a single man, produces two masterpieces, but that is the case with Hubert Benoit.'

=== Integral psychology movement ===
Benoit was quoted in one of the seminal works of the integral psychology movement, Ken Wilber's The Atman Project. Wilber, writing about the subjective wing of the Atman-project, commented (p. 103):

'Hubert Benoit has an exquisite quote on the nature of the subjective wing of the Atman-project. "One should ask oneself," he begins, "how this thing can be, how [any person] can come to believe that he accepts his temporal state, this limited and mortal state [of being only a separate self and not the Whole] which is in reality affectively unacceptable, how can he live this way?"'

A few pages later, Wilber wrote(p. 108):

'Once again, Hubert Benoit has a brilliantly precise statement on the nature of the Atman-project in general, and substitute objects in particular: "Man only seeks to deify himself in the temporal sphere because he is ignorant of his real divine essence (Atman). Man is born the son of God, participating totally in the nature of the Supreme Principle of the Universe; but he is forgetful of his origin, illusorily convinced that he is only this limited and mortal body which his senses perceive. Amnesic, he suffers from illusorily feeling himself abandoned by God (while he is in reality God himself), and he fusses about in the temporal sphere in search of affirmations to support his divinity which he cannot find there..."'

== Bibliography ==
- Métaphysique et Psychanalyse: Essai sur le Problème de la Réalisation de l'Homme. Paris: L'Imprimerie Mazarine. 1949. p. 156.
- "Introduction: Le Mental Cosmique par Le Maitre Hsi Yun selon la Doctrine de Huang Po" (PDF).
- De l'Amour, Psychologie de la Vie Affective et Sexuelle. Paris. 1951.
- La Doctrine Suprême (Vol.1): Réflexions sur le Bouddhisme Zen. Montrouge (Seine): Le Cercle du Livre. 1951. p. 239.
- La Doctrine Suprême (Vol.2): Études psychologique Selon la Pensée Zen. Montrouge (Seine): Le Cercle du Livre. 1952. p. 235.
- Lâcher Prise, Théorie et Pratique du Détachement Selon le Zen. Paris: La Colombe. 1954. p. 280.
- De la Réalisation intérieure. Paris: Le Courrier du Livre. 1979 [1984]. p. 118. ISBN 978-2702901441.

Translations by Hubert Benoit

- Deutsch, Helene (1948) [1949]. La Psychologie des femmes : Étude Psychanalytique (2 volumes).
- Suzuki, D.T. (1952). Le Non-Mental selon la Pensée Zen. Paris: Le Cercle du Livre.

Books and Articles by Benoit in translation

- Aldous Huxley (trans.) (March–April 1950). "Notes in Regard to a Technique of Timeless Realization". Vedanta and the West.
- La Doctrina Suprema. Buenos Aires: Ediciones Mundonuevo. 1961. p. 236.
- The Supreme Doctrine. trans. T.Gray (Wei Wu Wei), foreword by Aldous Huxley. London: Routledge and Kegan Paul. 1955. pp. ix, 248.; reprinted in 1998 by the Sussex Academic Press.
- The Many Faces of Love. trans. Philip Mairet. London: Routledge and Kegan Paul. 1955. pp. ix, 248.
- Let Go!. trans. Albert Low. Allen and Unwin. 1962.
- The Interior Realization. trans. by John Fitzsimmons Mahoney. York Beach, Maine: Samuel Weiser. 1987. pp. xii, 87. ISBN 0-87728-624-8.
- The Light of Zen in the West, incorporating The Supreme Doctrine and The Realization of the Self. trans. Graham Rooth. Eastbourne, UK; Portland, Oregon, USA: Sussex Academic Press. 2008. pp. xxv, 316. ISBN 978-1-84519-015-6.
- Self-Realization:And the Journey Beyond Ego. Kindle Version of De la Réalisation Intérieure, revised and taken from the above by the translator. https://www.amazon.co.uk/Self-Realization-And-Journey-Beyond-Ego-ebook/dp/B00SNAGOU4
