= Bodhin Kjolhede =

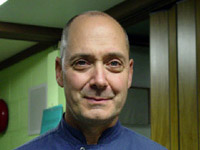
- Title: Roshi

Personal life
- Born: 1948 (age 77–78) Michigan
- Education: University of Michigan

Religious life
- Religion: Zen Buddhism
- School: Rochester Zen Center
- Lineage: Philip Kapleau

Senior posting
- Based in: Rochester Zen Center; Chapin Mill Buddhist Retreat Center
- Predecessor: Philip Kapleau
- Successor: Donna Kowal; John Pulleyn
- Students: Gerardo Gally Robert Goldmann Donna Kowal Kanja Odland Sante Poromaa John Pulleyn Sevan Ross Rick Smith Richard von Sturmer Amala Wrightson
- Website: www.rzc.org chapinmill.org

Bodhin Kjolhede (born 1948) is an American Sōtō/Rinzai Zen roshi and Abbot of the Rochester Zen Center (RZC), a position he assumed when Philip Kapleau retired from teaching in 1986. He founded the “Cloud-Water Sangha”, an international community of Zen centers led by teachers in his lineage.

== Zen training ==
Kjolhede was ordained as a priest in 1976. In 1986 he was formally installed as Kapleau's Dharma-successor and Abbot of the Rochester Zen Center. He has additionally been offered transmission in a Sōtō lineage, but has thus far chosen to decline.

== Lineage ==
Kjolhede has authorized ten of his disciples as teachers, some of whom are independent teachers with their own dharma successors:

- Gerardo Gally
- Robert Goldmann
- Donna Kowal
- Kanja Odland
- Sante Poromaa
- John Pulleyn
- Sevan Ross
- Rick Smith
- Richard von Sturmer
- Amala Wrightson

== Cloud-Water Sangha ==
The Cloud-Water Sangha is formed of centers led by Kjolhede's students and their disciples:

- Auckland Zen Centre (New Zealand)
- Berliner Zen-Gruppe (Germany)
- Casa Zen Mexico (Mexico)
- Cleveland Zazen Group (USA)
- Louisville Zen Center (USA)
- Madison Zen Center (USA)
- Rochester Zen Center (USA)
- Zenbuddhistiska Samfundet (Sweden, Finland, Germany, UK)

The name of the sangha is a translation of the Japanese term unsui.

== See also ==
- Buddhism in the United States
- Buddhism in the West
- Timeline of Zen Buddhism in the United States

== Galleries ==
=== RZC ===
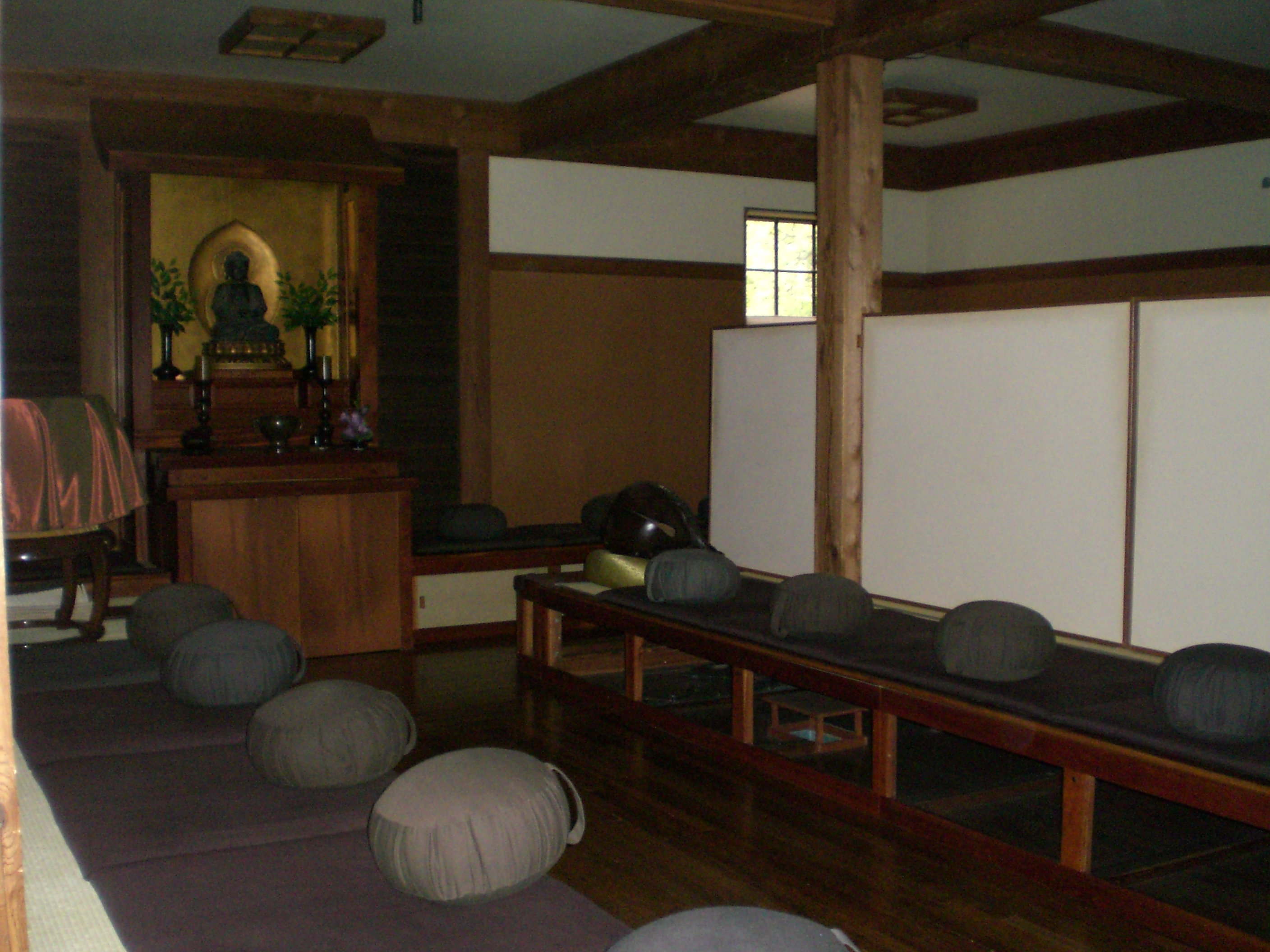

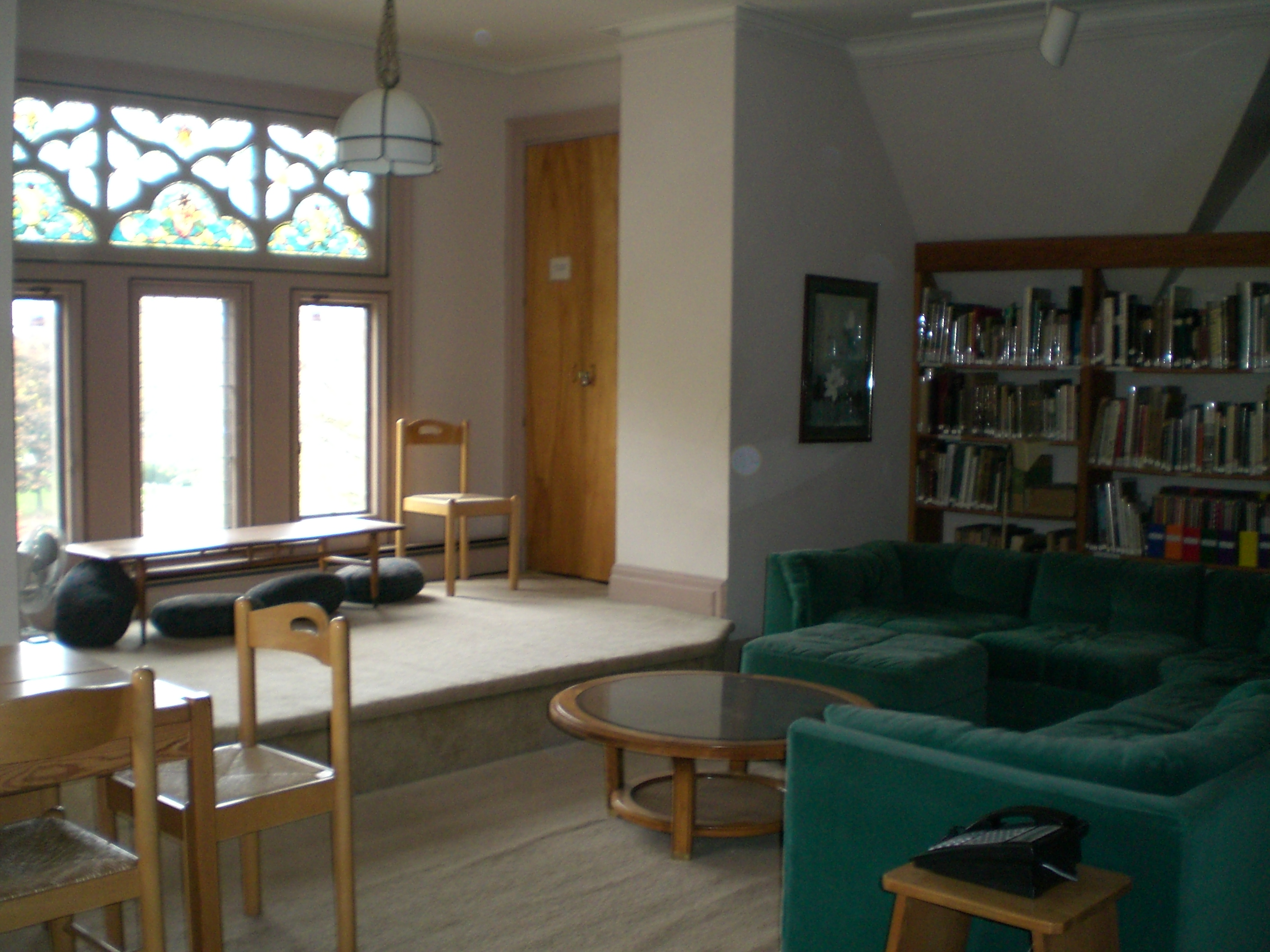

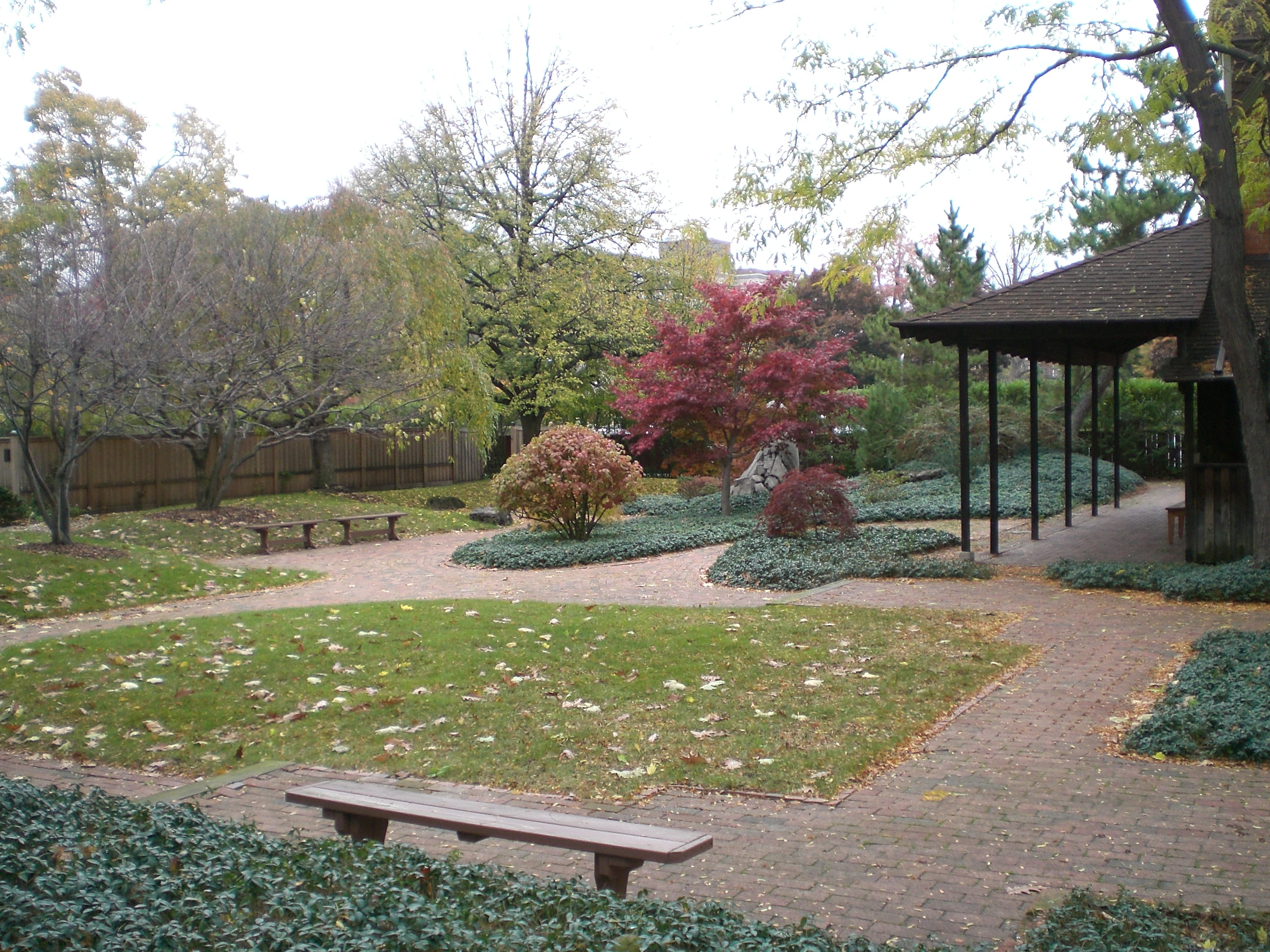

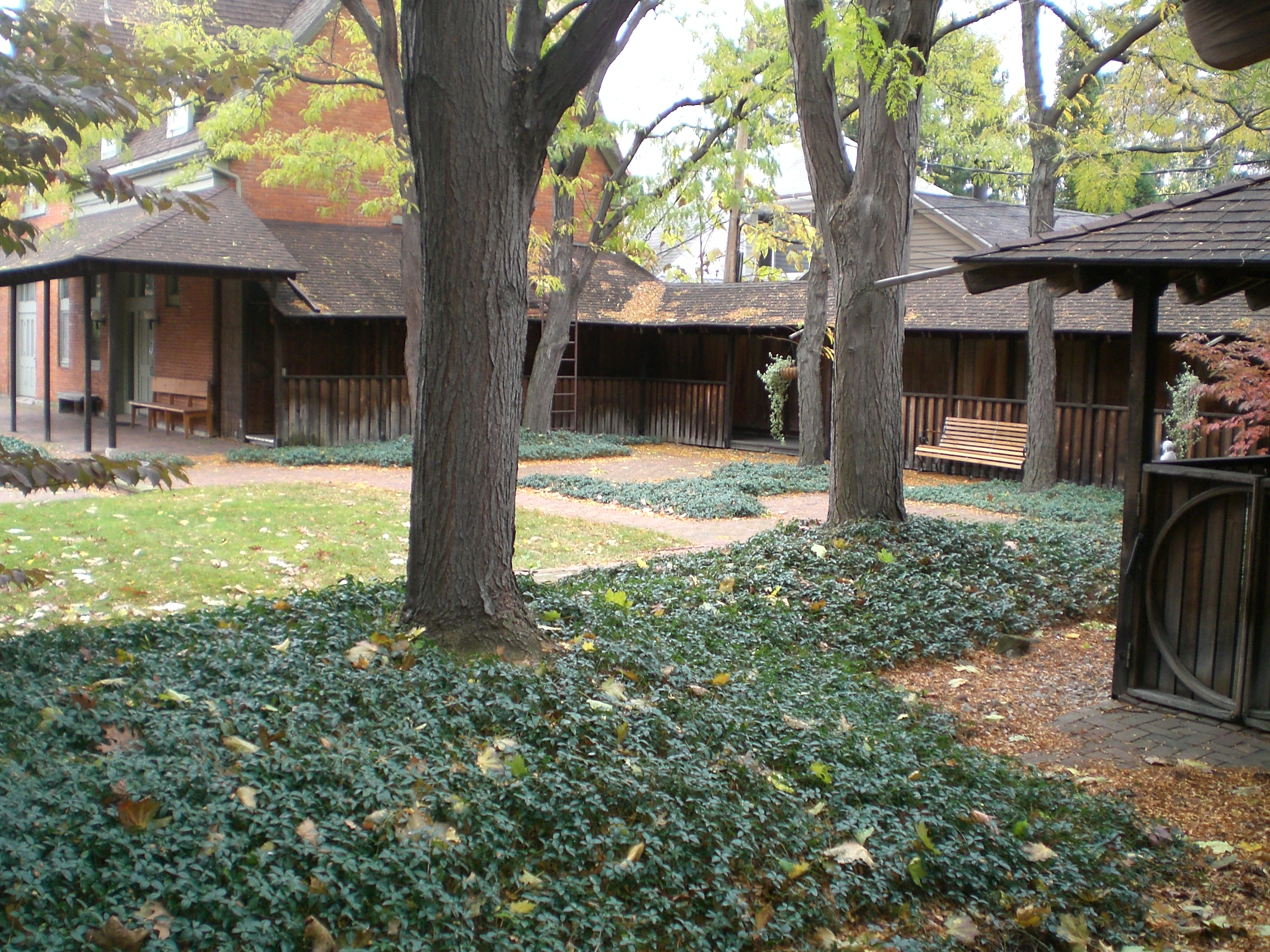

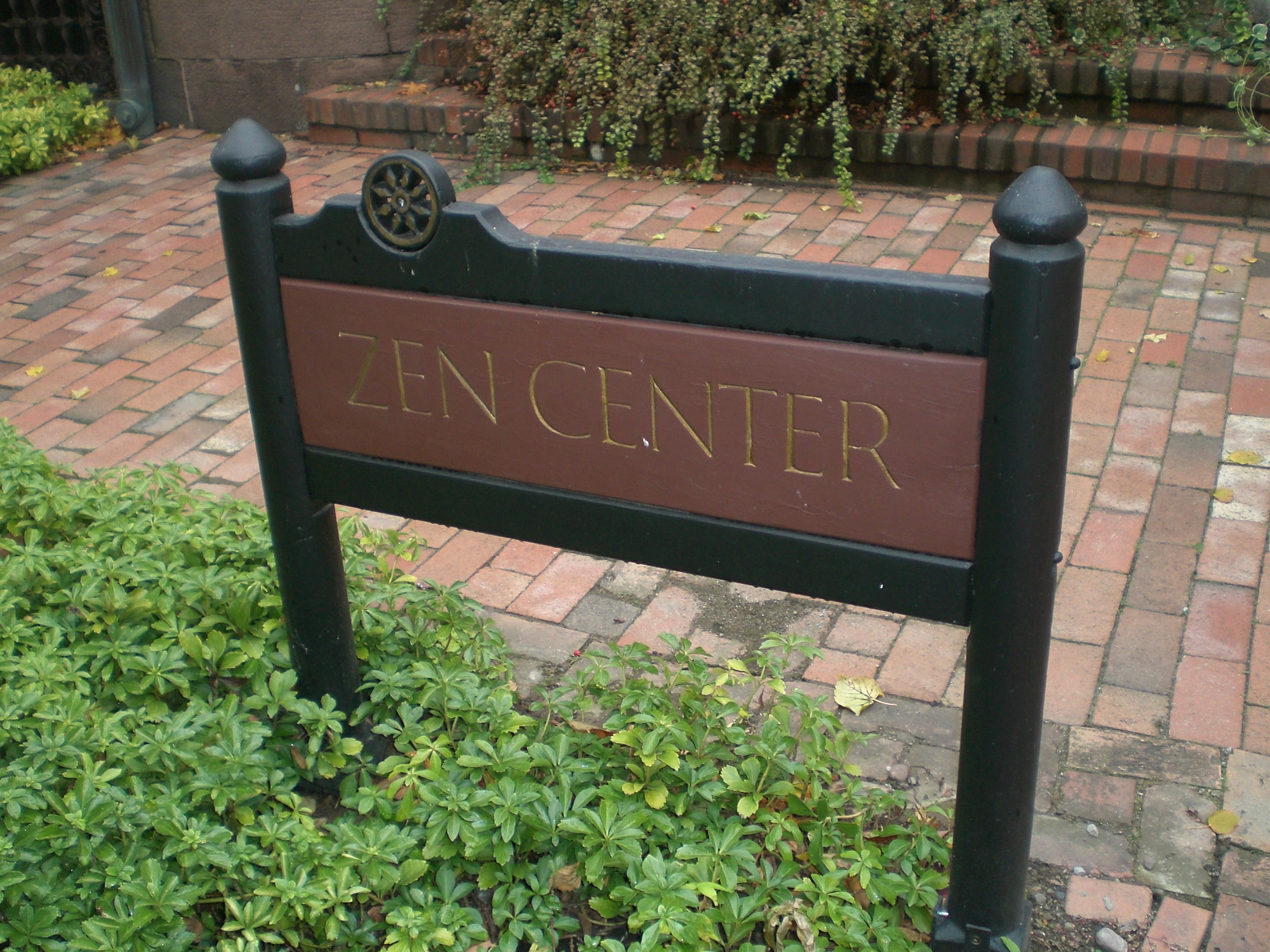
