= Swedish Buddhist Community =

- Sveriges buddhistiska gemenskap
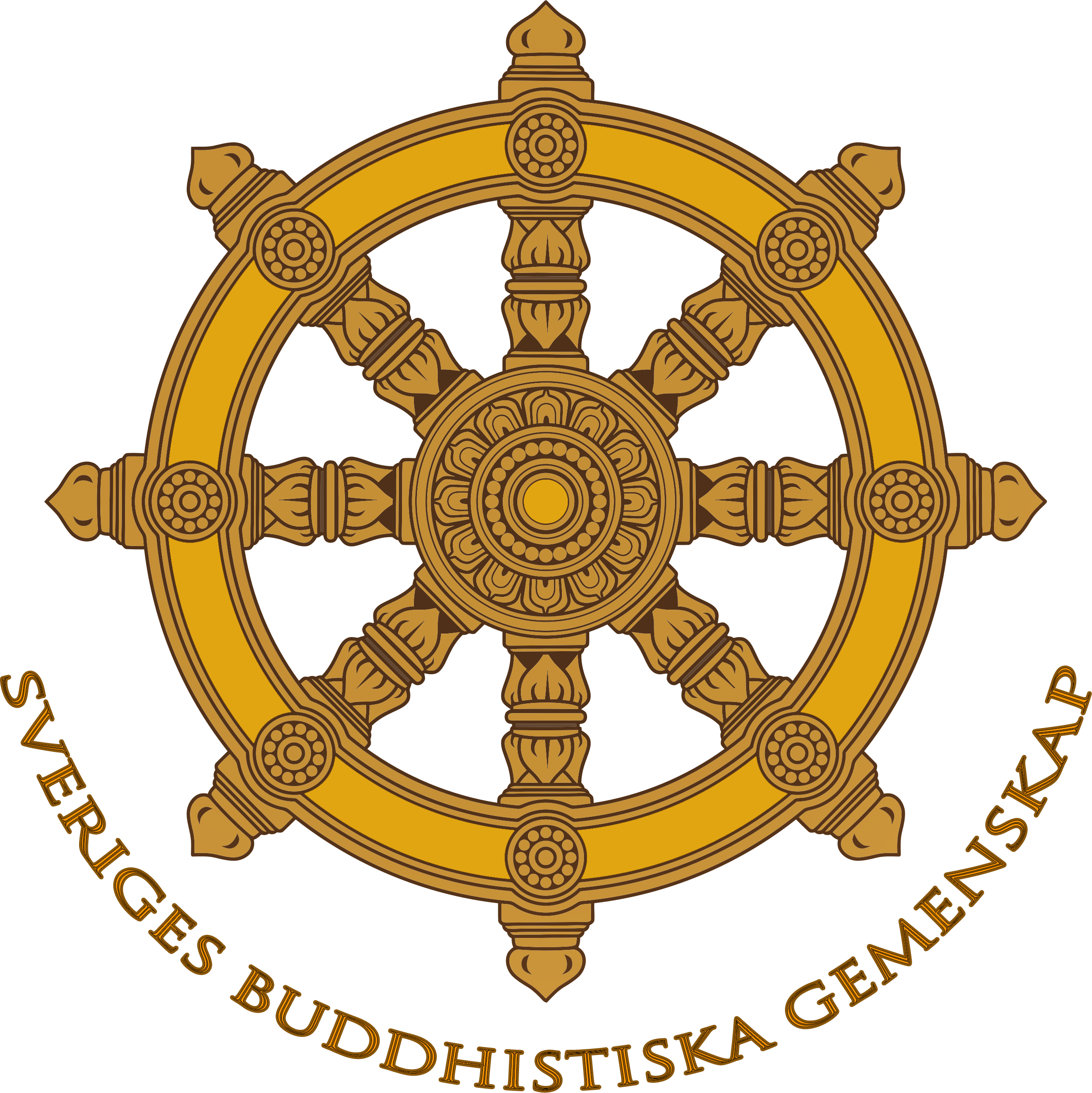
- Logo of the Swedish Buddhist Community
- Formation: 2019
- Legal status: registered congregation
- Members: 22 member organisations
- Chairperson: Trudy Fredriksson
- Website: https://www.sverigesbuddhister.se
- Formerly called: Swedish Buddhist Cooperation Council

Swedish Buddhist Community (Swedish Svenska buddhistiska gemenskap) is the national umbrella organisation for different Buddhist associations and congregations that are registered in Sweden. It has been a registered congregation since 2019.

The community was founded on 1 January 2019 as the successor of Swedish Buddhist Cooperation Council. It is a member of the European Buddhist Union.

Its current chairperson is Trudy Fredriksson.

SBC works together with the Swedish hospital church (Swedish Sjukhuskyrkan) to provide spiritual help for those hospital patients who identify as Buddhists.

The community consists of more than 25 member organisations that represent all three major branches of Buddhism (Theravada, Mahayana and Vajrayana).
