= Sesshin =

Period of intensive meditation

A sesshin (接心, or also 摂心/攝心 literally "touching the heart-mind") is a period of intensive meditation (zazen) retreat in a Japanese Zen monastery, or in a Zen monastery or Zen center that belongs to one of the Japanese Zen traditions outside of Japan.

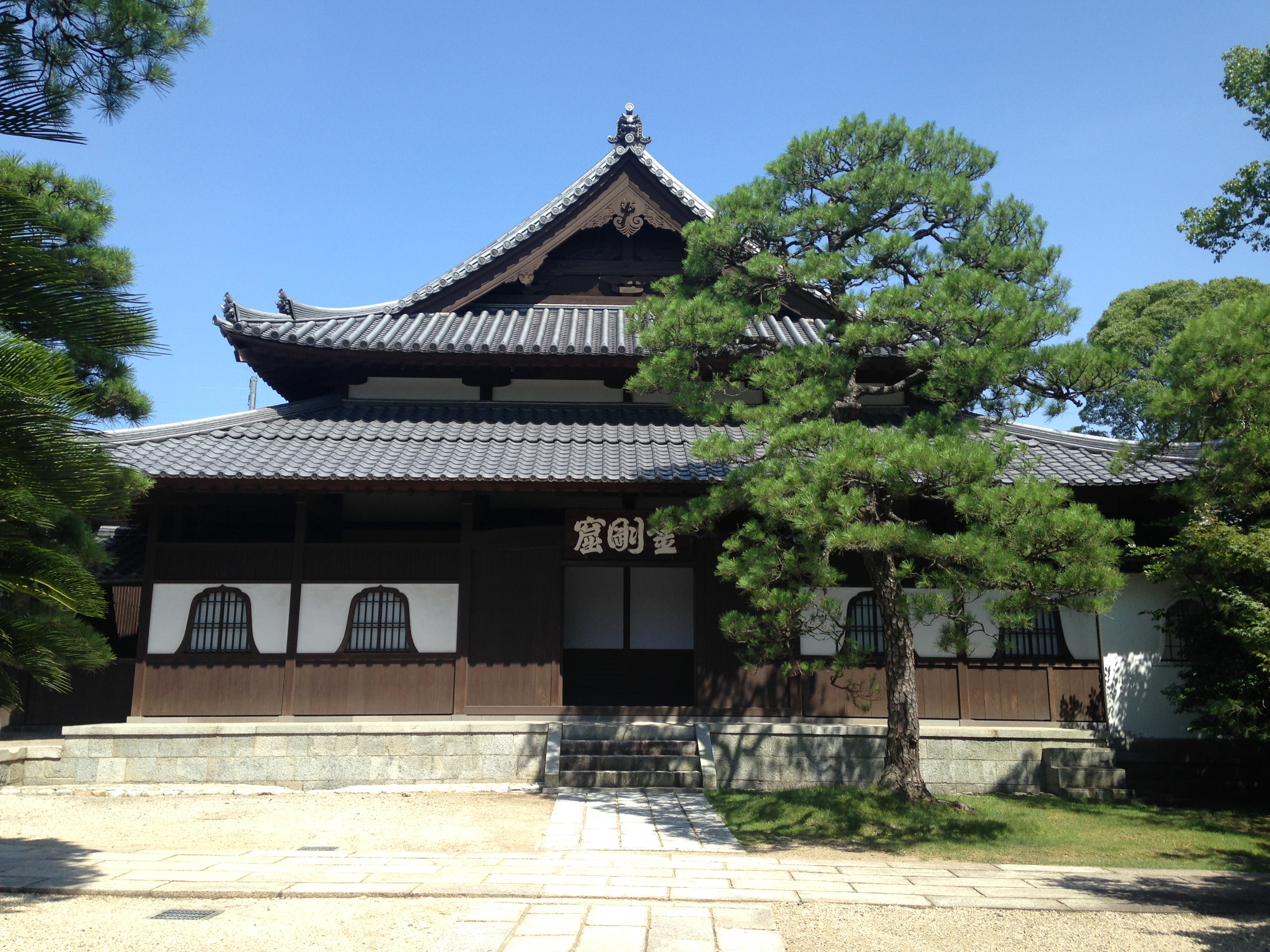
Outside of the meditation hall of a traditional zen monastery in Japan

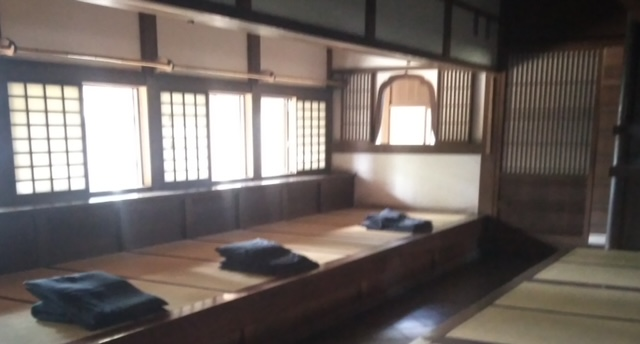
Inside of the meditation hall of a traditional zen monastery in Japan (Bairin-ji)

While the daily routine in the monastery requires the monks to meditate several hours a day, during a sesshin they devote themselves almost exclusively to zazen practice. The numerous 30- to 50-minute-long meditation periods are interleaved with short rest breaks, meals, and sometimes short periods of work (Japanese: 作務 samu) all performed with the same mindfulness; nightly sleep is kept to a minimum, at six hours or fewer. During the sesshin period, the meditation practice is occasionally interrupted by the master giving public talks (teisho) and individual direction in private meetings (which may be called dokusan, daisan, or sanzen) with a Zen Master.

In modern Buddhist practice in Japan and the West, sesshins are often attended by lay students and are typically one, three, five, or seven days in length. Seven-day sesshins are held several times a year at many Zen centers, especially in commemoration of the Buddha's awakening to full enlightenment (anuttarā-samyak-saṃbodhi). At this Rohatsu sesshin, practitioners seek to relax and quiet the mind to the point of cessation of mental chatter and emotional impulse, samadhi, kensho, or satori.

== A typical sesshin day ==
A sesshin schedule in the West will typically allow anywhere from nine to fifteen periods of zazen per day, 30–40 minutes each, with ten-minute periods of walking meditation (kinhin) between zazen periods. Traditional sesshin are more intensive, with meditations lasting 30–60 minutes each, with an absence of any rest or work breaks and sleep limited to less than five hours a day.

Meals are taken in a formal meditation ritual of ōryōki. Work periods in westernized sesshin are sometimes scheduled and may comprise one to two hours of the day, usually in gardening, cooking, or cleaning. The sesshin schedule typically allows for four to five hours of sleep per night, though practitioners occasionally will spend much of the next-to-last night of a five- or seven-day sesshin in zazen. This is called yaza and is much revered as a particularly effective time to meditate when the thinking mind and ego lack the energy to derail practice.

It has been reported that at least three days of sesshin are usually required for the practitioner to "settle down" into the sesshin routine to a point where the mind becomes quiet enough for the deeper types of meditation and samadhi to begin.

== Psychological aspects ==
Some people unfamiliar with the process have reported becoming disoriented and fearful of incurring psychological damage during sesshin. Some Zen centers do not allow novices to attend long sesshins without much prior experience and screening by the practice leaders. Sesshin can lead to deep experiences of awakening that may at times be somewhat traumatic, akin to a "spiritual emergency" or symptoms of Kundalini Syndrome.

While this may seem daunting at first, people who practice regular zazen do not usually have problems with sesshin. Heightening of senses may arise during sesshin. Sometimes practitioners report that food has incredible flavor and colors become more vivid and pronounced.

== Social aspects ==
There is no talking during sesshin. Silence is observed so that each student may both concentrate on their experience and not influence those of others.

At the end of the sesshin, there is usually a meal when students are allowed to talk to others for the first time since arriving.

== See also ==
- Ango
- Buddhist terms and concepts
- Tenzo
