= Rochester Zen Center =

Buddhist sangha in Rochester, New York

Coordinates: 43°09′09.5″N 77°35′24″W

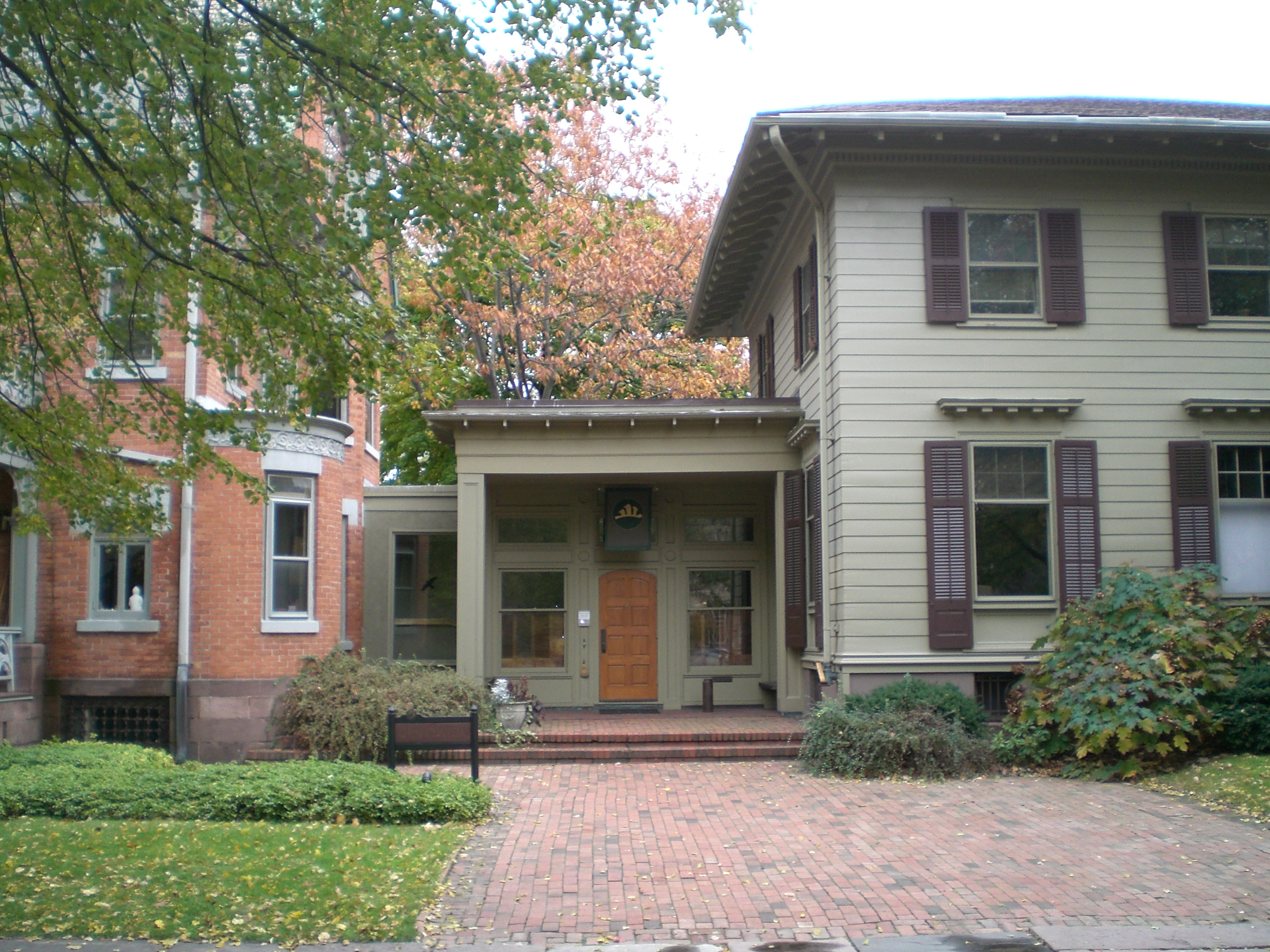

Religion
- Affiliation: Independent

Location
- Location: 7 Arnold Park; Rochester, New York 14607-2082
- Country: United States
- Interactive map of Rochester Zen Center

Architecture
- Founder: Philip Kapleau
- Completed: 1966

Website
- http://www.rzc.org/

The Rochester Zen Center (RZC) is a Sōtō and Rinzai Zen Buddhist sangha in the Kapleau lineage, located in Rochester, New York, and established in 1966 by Philip Kapleau. It is one of the oldest Zen centers in the United States.

== History ==
Since its founding, the Rochester Zen Center has become one of the largest Buddhist centers in North America. From those first twenty-two individuals, membership has grown to more than six hundred, with sitting groups and affiliate centers in Mexico and Germany, and throughout the U.S. In 1981 Rochester Zen Center community split, when Toni Packer left the center to form the Springwater Center, located an hour south of Rochester.

The Rochester Zen Center has also contributed to the intellectual development of American Zen, through Philip Kapleau's books, The Zen of Living and Dying, Zen Merging of East and West, To Cherish All Life, and the recent Awakening to Zen and the writings of its members and its decennial anniversary conferences. In 1986, the 20th Anniversary Conference focused on "Buddhism and Nonviolence," and the 1996 Thirtieth Anniversary explored "Buddhism in America."

From 1986 to 2022 the head abbot at Rochester Zen Center was Bodhin Kjolhede, who was sanctioned to teach by Kapleau. Since 2022 Sensei John Pulleyn and Sensei Donna Kowal, dharma heirs of Bodhin Kjolhede, have served as co-directors. The community offers intensive Zen sesshin retreats, introductory workshops and training programs throughout the year and is open to guests.

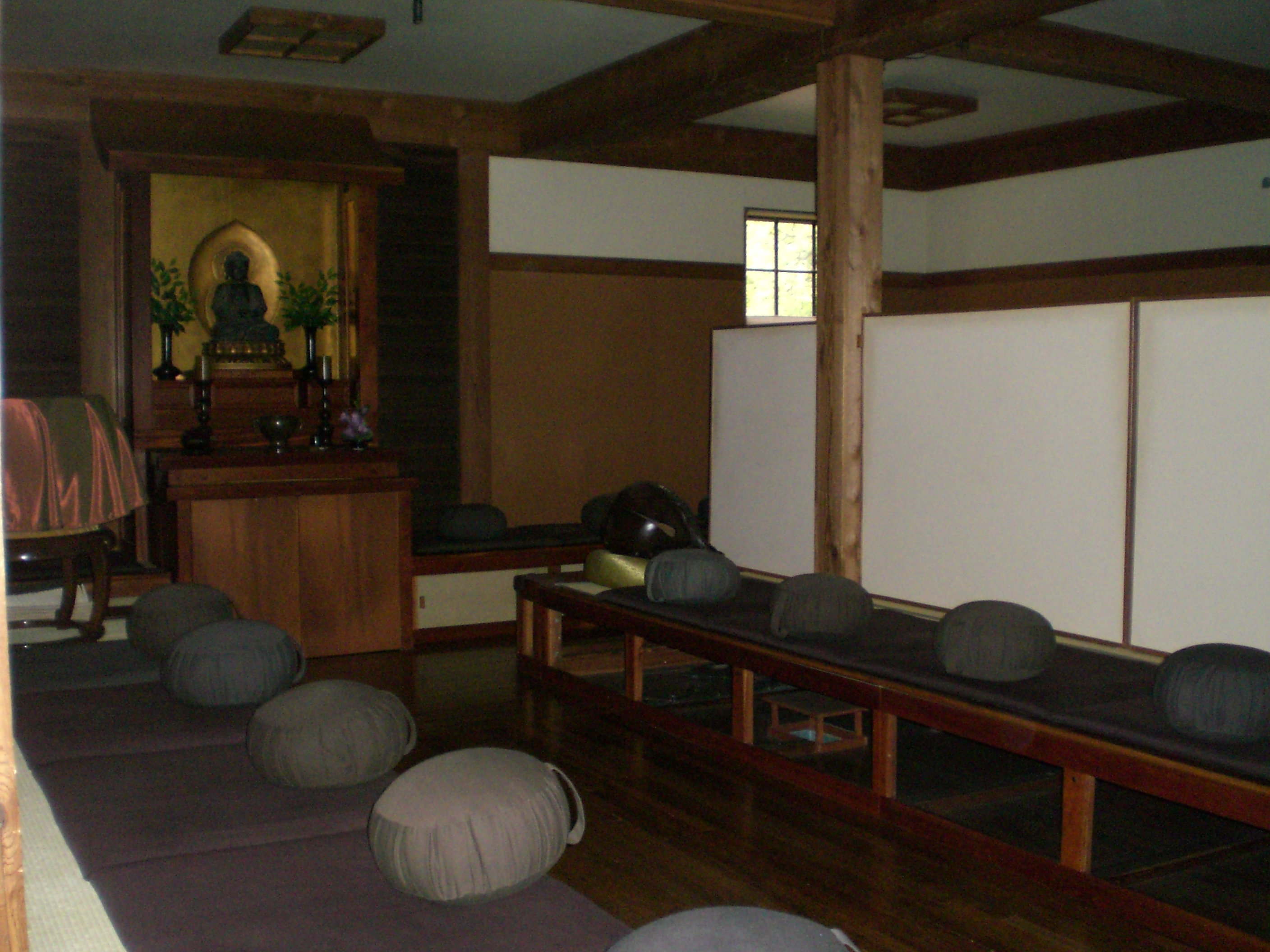

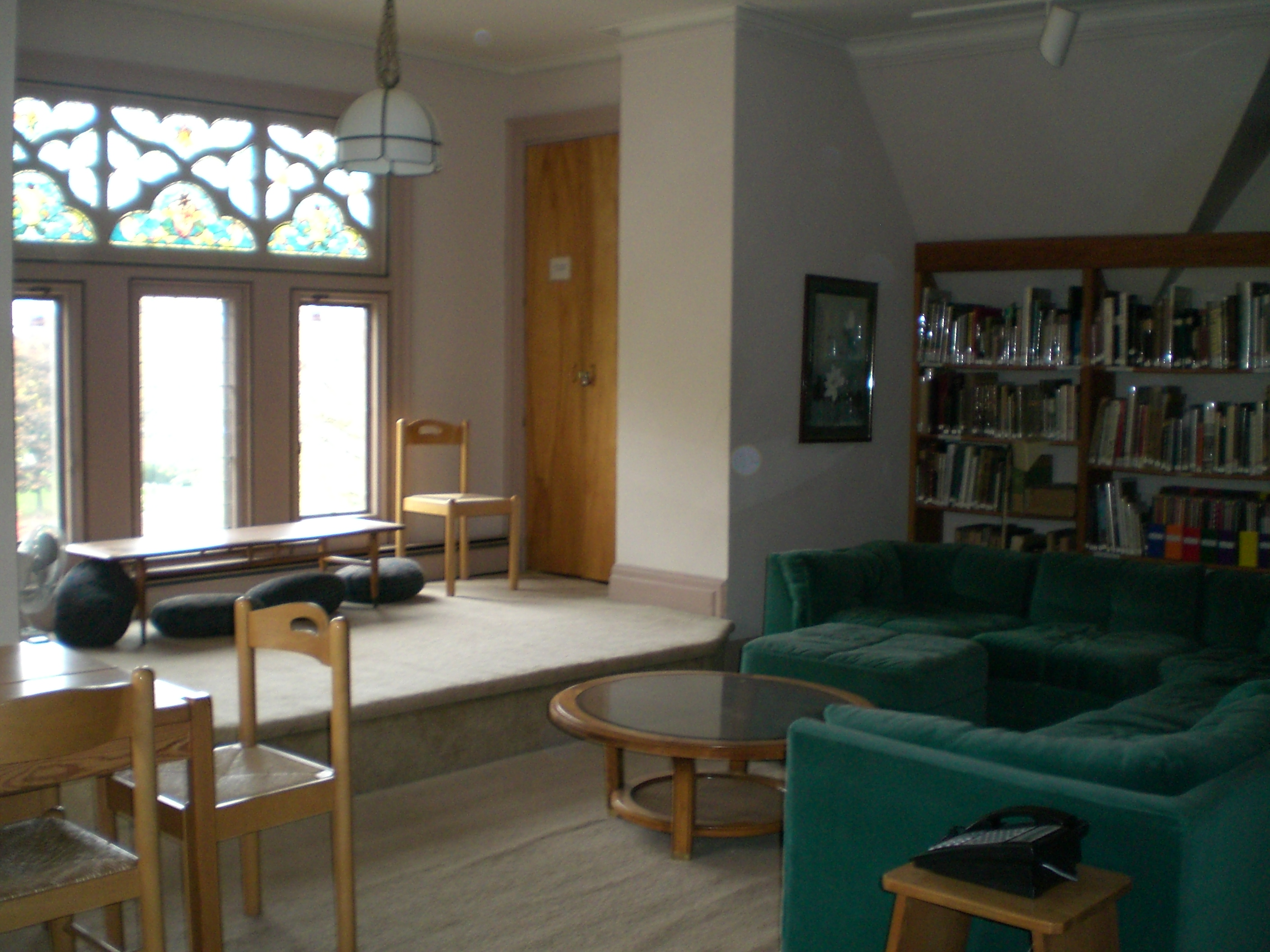

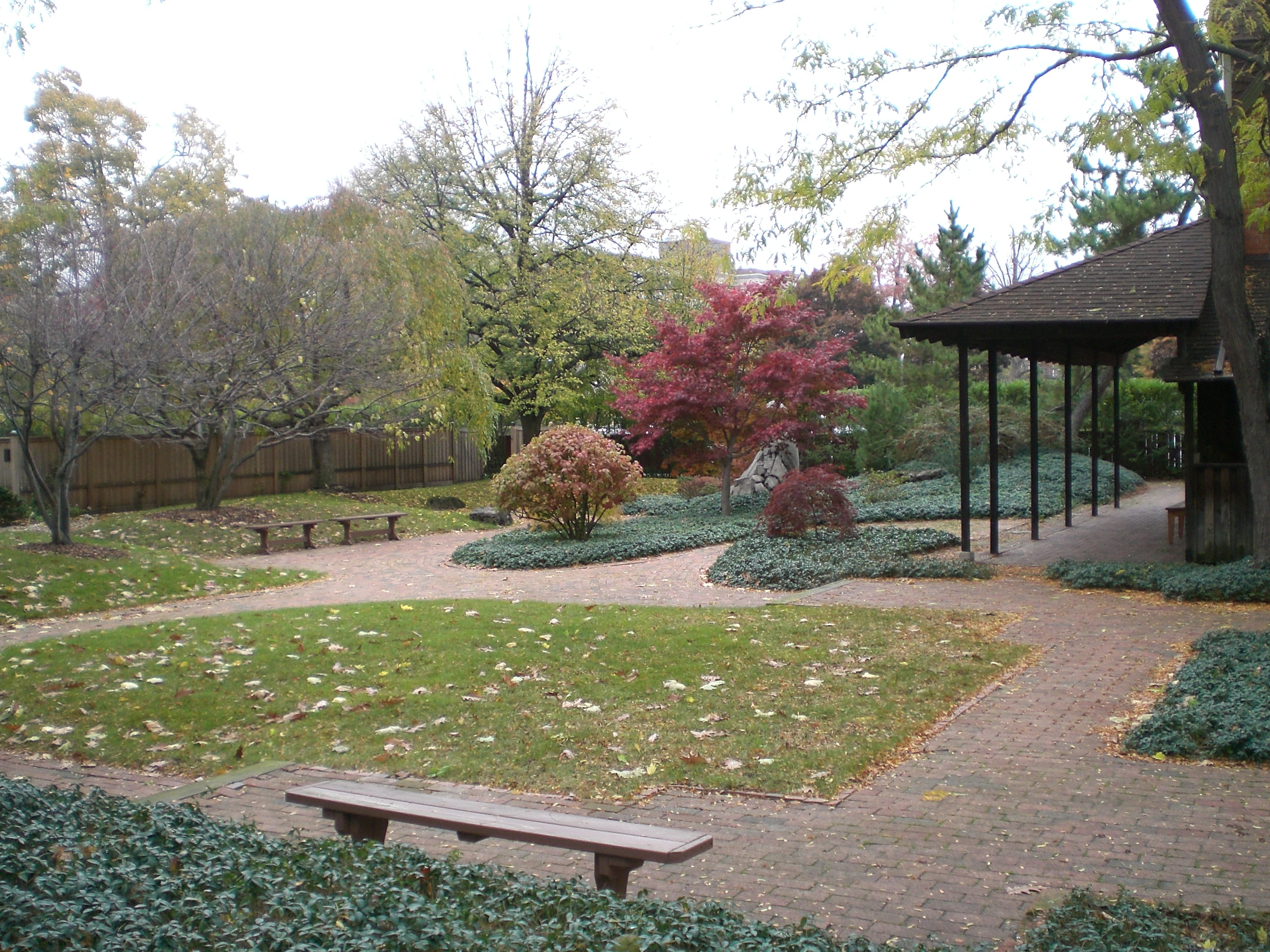

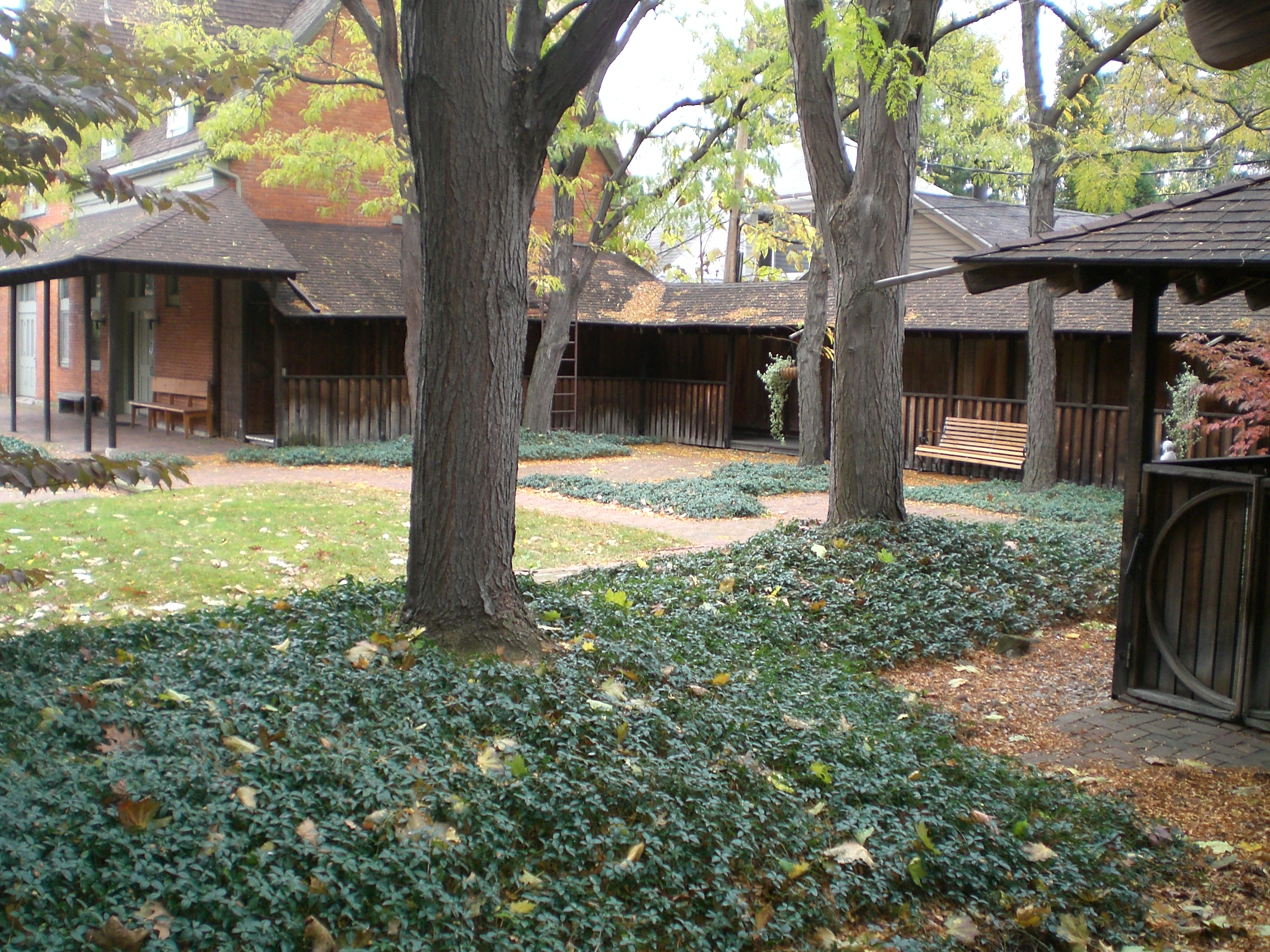

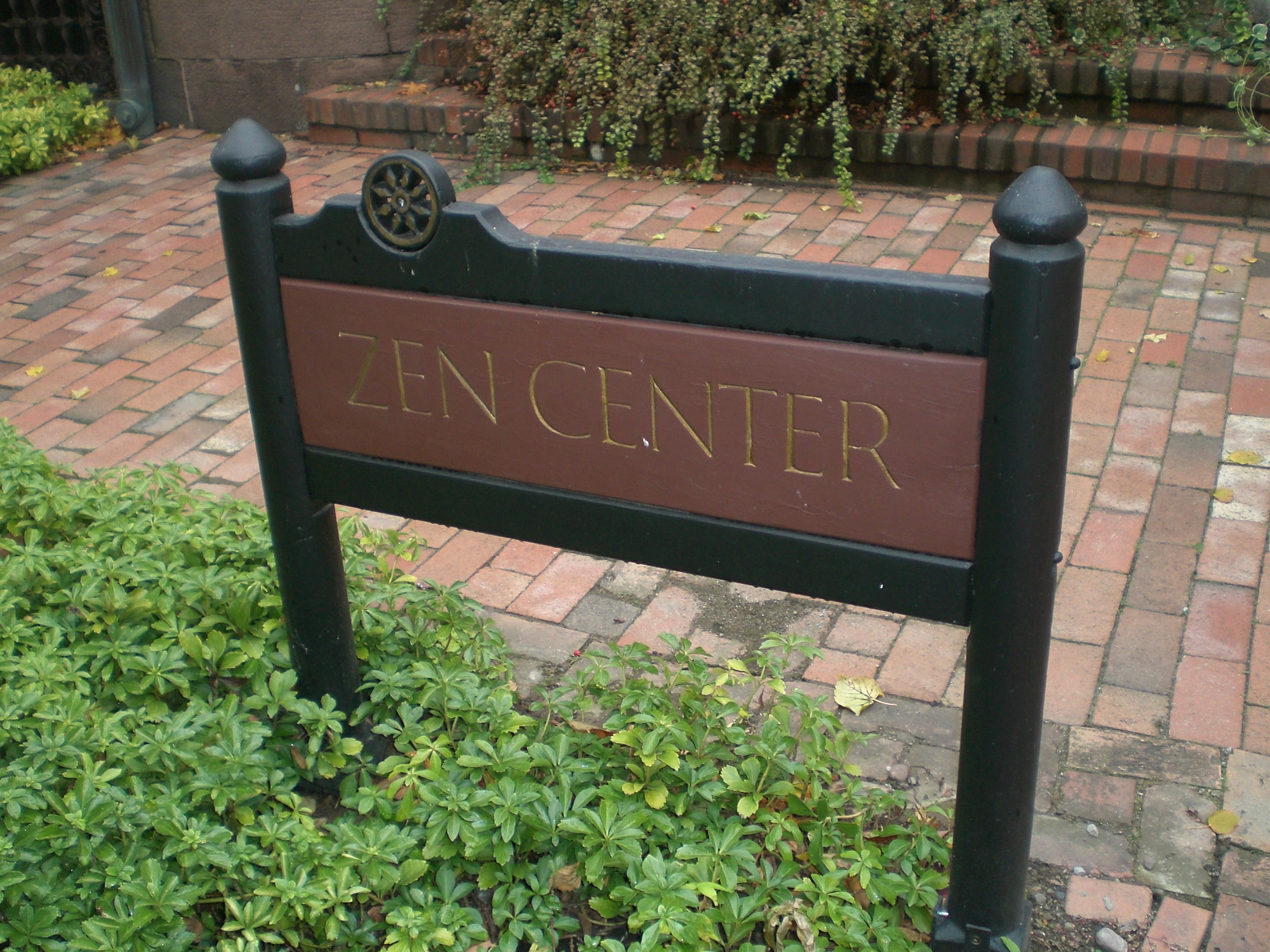

== Chapin Mill Buddhist Retreat ==
The Rochester Zen Center also has a 135-acre (0.55 km^{2}) country retreat named Chapin Mill, donated by Ralph Chapin. Each year the center has several sesshin at Chapin Mill. The retreat center held a groundbreaking in April 2000. Building began in 2003, and was completed in 2007.

Dining hall facing kitchen.

Carved zendo door

Kannon Room

Facing enso, zendo on right carved door on left.

== Notable residents ==
- Weezer frontman Rivers Cuomo was raised at the Rochester Zen Center until he was approximately 5 years old.

== See also ==
- Philip Kapleau
- Bodhin Kjolhede
- Chester Carlson
- Timeline of Zen Buddhism in the United States

== Sources ==
- Farrer-Halls, Gill (2000). The Illustrated Encyclopedia of Buddhist Wisdom. Quest Books. p. 150. ISBN 978-0-8356-0786-5.
- Ryūken Williams, Duncan; Christopher S. Queen (1998). American Buddhism: Methods and Findings in Recent Scholarship. RoutledgeCurzon. p. 93. ISBN 978-0-7007-1081-2.
- Ford, James Ishmael (2006). Zen Master Who?: A Guide to the People and Stories of Zen. Wisdom Publications. p. 759. ISBN 0-86171-509-8.
- McDaniel, Richard Bryan (2015). Cypress trees in the garden : the second generation of Zen teaching in North America. Sumeru Press. ISBN 9781896559261. OCLC 931721846.
- Kraft, Kenneth (1998). Zen, Tradition and Transition. Grove Press. p. 190. ISBN 978-0-8021-3162-1.
