= List of Buddhist temples in Canada =

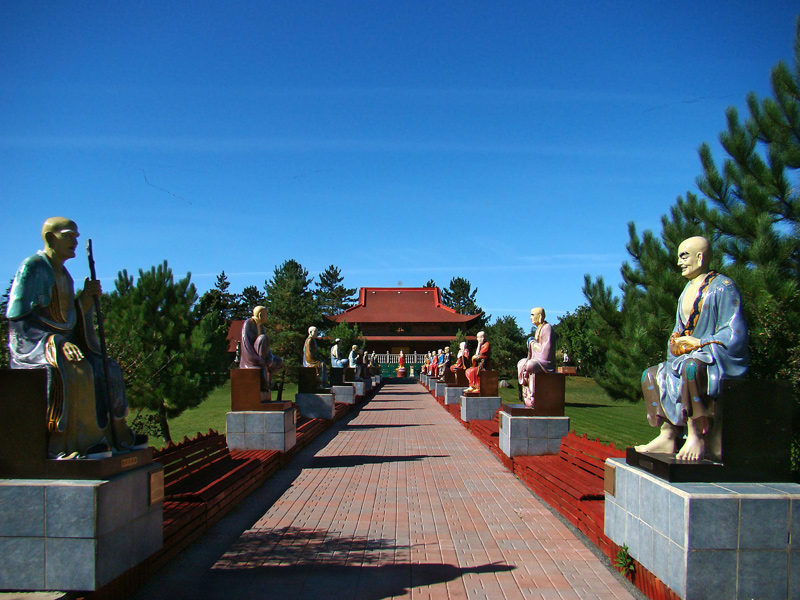
Tam Bao Son Monastery, Harrington, Quebec

This is a list of Buddhist temples, monasteries, stupas, and pagodas in Canada for which there are articles on the English Wikipedia, sorted by province.

== Alberta ==
- Calgary True Buddha Pai Yuin Temple – Calgary
- Raymond Buddhist Church – Raymond (closed in 2006)
- Calgary Soto Zen – Calgary
- Avatamsaka Monastery – Calgary

== British Columbia ==
- Birken Forest Buddhist Monastery – Kamloops
- International Buddhist Temple – Richmond
- Ling Yen Mountain Temple – Richmond
- Mountain Rain Zen Community – Vancouver
- Thrangu Monastery – Richmond
- Vancouver Buddhist Temple – Vancouver

== Nova Scotia ==
- Gampo Abbey – Pleasant Bay

== Ontario ==
- Buddhist Meditation Centre of Greater Toronto – Markam
- Fo Guang Shan Temple, Toronto – Mississauga
- Tisarana Buddhist Monastery – Perth
- Toronto Zen Centre – Toronto
- Wutai Shan Buddhist Garden – Cavan Monaghan
- Zen Centre of Ottawa – Ottawa

== See also ==
- Buddhism in Canada
- Jodo Shinshu Buddhist Temples of Canada
- List of Buddhist temples
