= Tisarana Buddhist Monastery =

Theravada Buddhist monastery near Perth, Ontario, Canada

- Location within Ontario

Religion
- Affiliation: Theravada, Thai Forest Tradition
- Status: Active

Location
- Location: Perth, Ontario
- Country: Canada
- Coordinates: 44°46′48″N 76°19′12″W

Architecture
- Founder: Ajahn Viradhammo
- Completed: 2006

Website
- https://tisarana.ca/

Tisarana is a Buddhist monastery located in Ontario, Canada; about halfway between Ottawa and Kingston. It is the primary residence for fully-ordained Theravada Buddhist monks, but it is also open to aspirants to the monastic life, as well as to laypeople who want to learn more about Buddhist principles and meditation.

The monastery is based on the Thai Forest Tradition of Ajahn Chah and Ajahn Sumedho, having been founded by Ajahn Viradhammo—the abbot and the most senior monk at Tisarana.

As expected in the Forest tradition, the practices there emphasize meditation in a secluded environment as the focus of monastic life.

== History ==
=== Founder ===
Ajahn Viradhammo (formerly Vitauts Akers) was born in Germany, 1947, where his parents were living as Latvian refugees. The family moved to Toronto when he was four years old. He went to live in India when he was about 22 years old, where Sāmanera Bodhesako introduced him to Buddhism.

From there, he travelled to Thailand where he became a novice monk at Wat Mahathat in 1973, and in the following year he took his ordination at Wat Pah Pong, with the Venerable Ajahn Chah.

He eventually went back to Canada in 1977 to visit his family. While there, Ajahn Chah asked him to join Ajahn Sumedho at the Hampstead Vihāra (which was eventually sold by the English Sangha Trust) in London. Afterwards, he was involved in the establishment of both the Chithurst Buddhist Monastery and Harnham Buddhist Monastery in the United Kingdom. His journey continued in New Zealand, now accompanied by Venerable Thanavaro, where he lived for 10 years and established the Bodhinyānārāma Monastery, in the Stokes Valley.

=== Establishment in Canada ===
After living between UK and New Zealand, he moved to Ottawa in 2002 to take care of his mother for nine years. Finally, the Tisarana Buddhist Monastery was founded, where he moved-in as a full-time resident. Tisarana is supported by the Ottawa Buddhist Society.

As of July 2026, there are 5 resident monks in Tisarana, including Ajahn Viradhammo.

== Teachings ==
While Buddhist practice in the monastery is a primarily offline, on-site experience (therefore overnight visitors are expected to abstain from using telephones, computers, or email for any external business or for entertainment), Tisarana offers a series of Dhamma talks on their YouTube channel for the online community.

Their website also includes a section of books published by Ajahn Viradhammo and various teachers, available in multiple digital formats.

== Location ==
Tisarana Buddhist Monastery is located in the Ontario countryside, 15 km from Perth, just over one hour drive south-west of Ottawa.

Its location in the forest wilderness follows current practices of the Thai forest tradition, which ultimately mimics some of the lifestyle that many of the early Shakyamuni Buddha's disciples adopted.

== See also ==
- Buddhism in Canada
- Thai Forest Tradition
- Forest Tradition of Ajahn Chah
- Ajahn Chah
- Ajahn Viradhammo
- Sati Sārāņīya Hermitage
- Arrow River Forest Hermitage
- Birken Forest Buddhist Monastery
- Wat Pah Pong
- Wat Pah Nanachat
