= Buddhism in Canada =

National occurrence of Buddhism

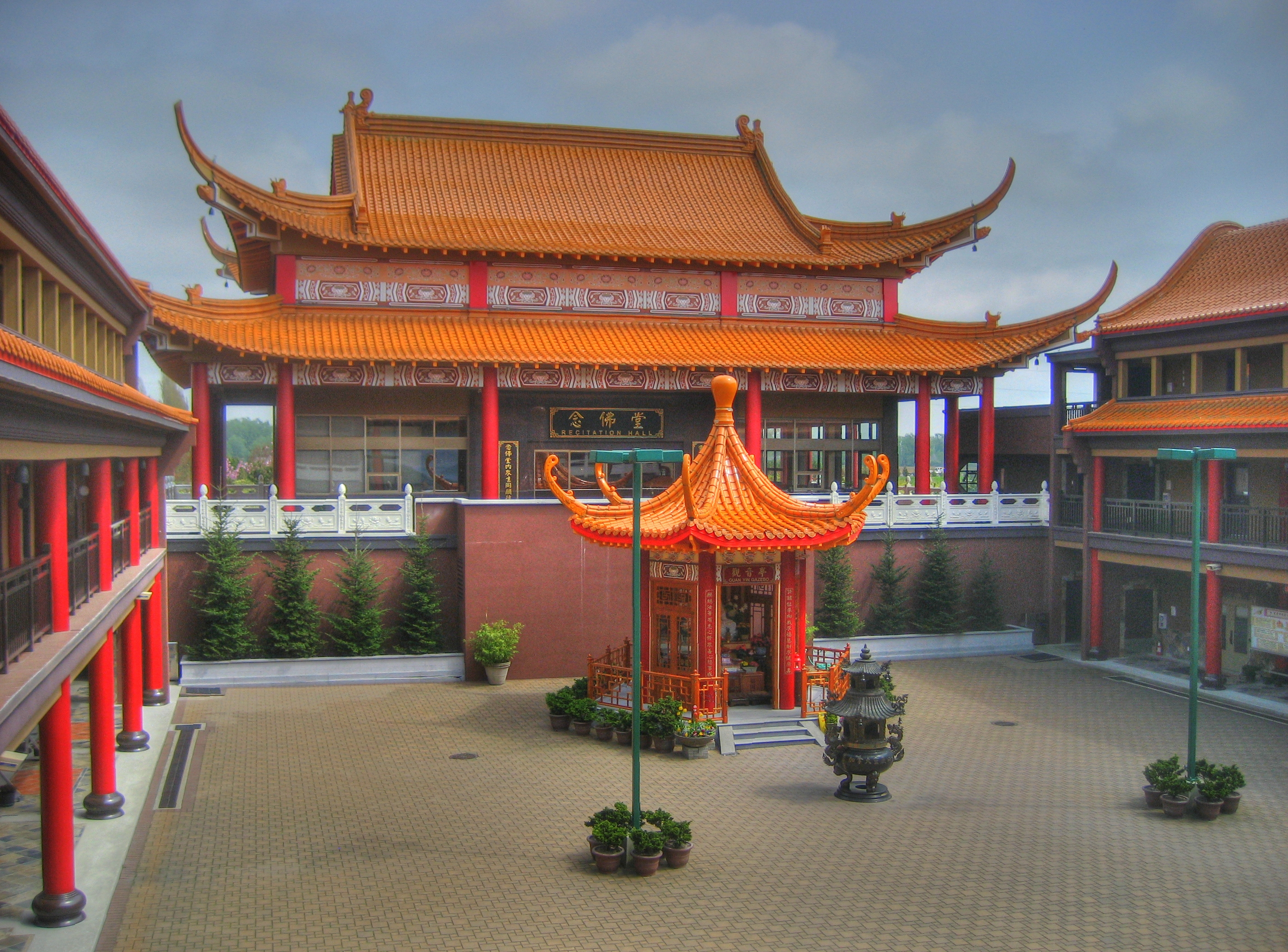
Ling Yen Mountain Temple in Richmond, BC

Buddhism is one of the smaller minority religions in Canada. The 2021 Canadian census recorded 356,975 Buddhists, representing 1% of Canada's population, the same percentage reported in the 2001 census.

== History ==
Buddhism has been practised in Canada for more than a century. Buddhism arrived in Canada with the arrival of Chinese labourers in the territories during the 19th century. Modern Buddhism in Canada traces to Japanese immigration during the late 19th century. The first Japanese Buddhist temple in Canada was built at the Ishikawa Hotel in Vancouver in 1905. Over time, the Japanese Jōdo Shinshū branch of Buddhism established the largest Buddhist organization in Canada. In the 1971 Canadian census, nearly two-thirds of Buddhists in Canada were of Japanese ethnicity.

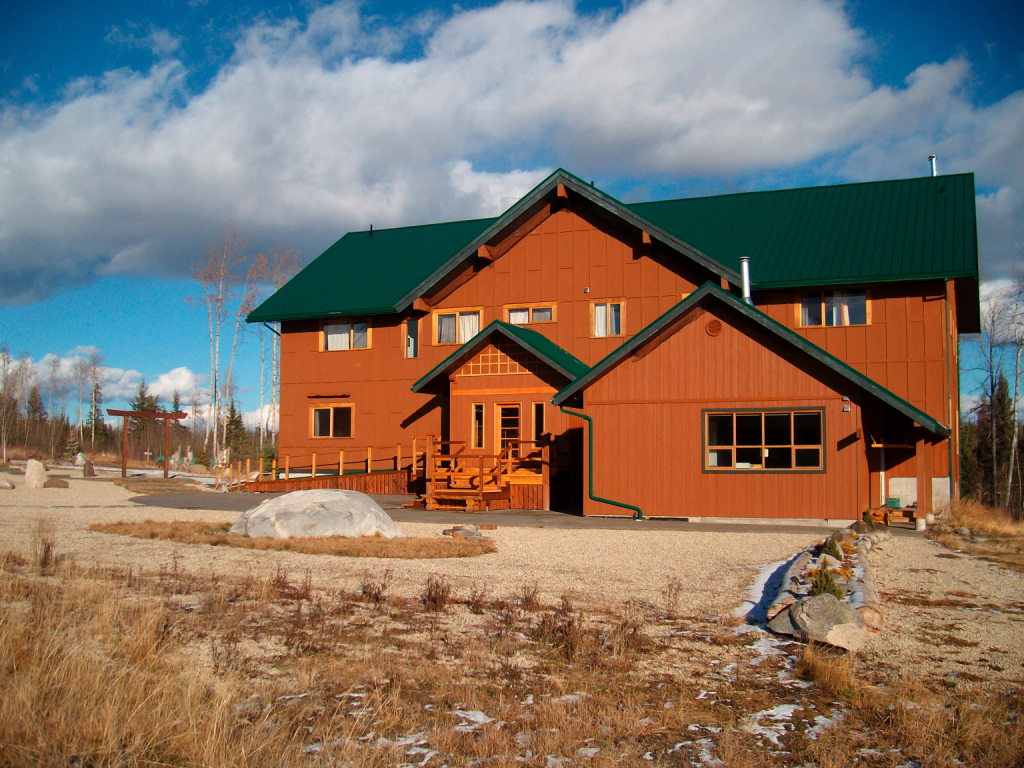
Birken Forest Buddhist Monastery near Kamloops, BC

A substantial expansion of Buddhism in Canada began in the 1970s. Changes in Canadian immigration and refugee policies corresponded to increasing communities from South, Southeast, and East Asian nations with Buddhist traditions. The 2001 Canadian census reported that 54.5% of Buddhists in Canada were of Chinese origin, and 33.5% were of Southeast Asian origin, while the percentage of Japanese Buddhists had declined to 4.5% of the total. In addition, the popularity of the 14th Dalai Lama, the third person ever to be granted honorary Canadian citizenship in 2006, increased the Canadian public's exposure to and interest in Buddhism, particularly Tibetan Buddhism.

In 2012, there were 489 Buddhist organizations in Canada, including temples, centres, associations, retreats, charities and businesses. All lineages (Theravada, Mahayana, Vajrayana, and newer Navayana schools) are represented. The following universities in Canada have incorporated Buddhist studies either as a sub-discipline of religious studies, or as a subsidiary to Asian studies: the University of Toronto has two professors specialized in Buddhism, and the University of Calgary also maintains two professorships related to Buddhism. Smaller universities in Canada will typically have just one professor assigned to Buddhism (sometimes the same professor responsible for all Asian Religions) as, e.g., at the University of Lethbridge.

Many immigrant and refugee populations continue to maintain their traditions in Canada, building places of worship in both urban and rural areas, including the Sinhalese Mahavihara (1978) in Toronto, the Cambodian Khmer Pagoda of Canada (1980) in Montreal, the Vietnamese Đại Tòng Lâm Monastery (1988) in Harrington, Quebec, the Lao and Thai Theravada Wat Buddhadhamma (1992) in Regina, Saskatchewan, and the Chinese Wutai Shan Buddhist Garden (2019) in Cavan Monaghan, Ontario. In the 2021 Canadian census, over 90% of Buddhists reported being part of a visible minority, with Chinese (37%), Vietnamese (26%), Cambodian (5.5%), and Sri Lankan/Sinhalese (5.3%) being the most common ethnic origins.

Small numbers of Canadians of non-Asian ancestry have also been converting to Buddhism. Many non-Asian Canadians, such as Namgyal Rinpoche, Glenn H. Mullin, and Richard Barron, have embraced Buddhism in various traditions and some have become leaders in their respective sanghas. The book Choosing Buddhism by the cultural anthropologist Mauro Peressini provides a survey of the history of Buddhism in Canada and documents the conversion to Buddhism of eight notable contemporary Canadian Buddhists including Ajahn Viradhammo, Jim Bedard, Albert Low, Taigen Henderson, Zengetsu Myōkyo, Louis Cormier, Kelsang Drenpa and Tsultrim Palmo.

== Demographics ==
Buddhist population in Canada
Year	Pop.	±%
1901	10,407	—
1911	10,012	−3.8%
1921	11,281	+12.7%
1931	15,784	+39.9%
1941	15,635	−0.9%
1951	8,184	−47.7%
1961	11,611	+41.9%
1971	16,175	+39.3%
1981	51,955	+221.2%
1991	163,415	+214.5%
2001	300,345	+83.8%
2011	366,830	+22.1%
2021	356,975	−2.7%
Sources: Beyer, 2011 and 2021 Censuses

Buddhist population in Canadian provinces and territories, 2011–2021
Province or territory	Buddhist population		Change
Province or territory	2021	2011	Change
Ontario	164,210	163,750	+0.3%
British Columbia	83,860	90,620	−7.5%
Quebec	48,370	52,385	−7.7%
Alberta	42,830	44,410	−3.6%
Manitoba	7,440	6,770	+9.9%
Saskatchewan	4,415	4,265	+3.5%
Nova Scotia	2,955	2,205	+34.0%
New Brunswick	1,115	975	+14.4%
Prince Edward Island	755	560	+34.8%
Newfoundland and Labrador	490	400	+22.5%
Yukon	260	295	−11.9%
Northwest Territories	250	170	+47.1%
Nunavut	20	20	0.0%
Canada	356,975	366,830	−2.7%

Percentage of people who are Buddhists in Canadian provinces and territories, 2021
Province or territory	Buddhist
British Columbia	1.68%
Ontario	1.15%
Alberta	1.00%
Yukon	0.65%
Northwest Territories	0.61%
Quebec	0.57%
Manitoba	0.55%
Prince Edward Island	0.49%
Saskatchewan	0.39%
Nova Scotia	0.30%
New Brunswick	0.14%
Newfoundland and Labrador	0.10%
Nunavut	0.05%
Canada	0.97%

=== Prison population ===
Public Safety Canada's 2023 statistics indicated that 1.9% of offenders in federal (CSC) facilities are Buddhists.

== See also ==
- List of Buddhist temples in Canada
- Bliss and Wisdom
