= Xilin Temple =

Buddhist temple in Jiujiang, Jiangxi, China

- 西林寺 / 西琳寺
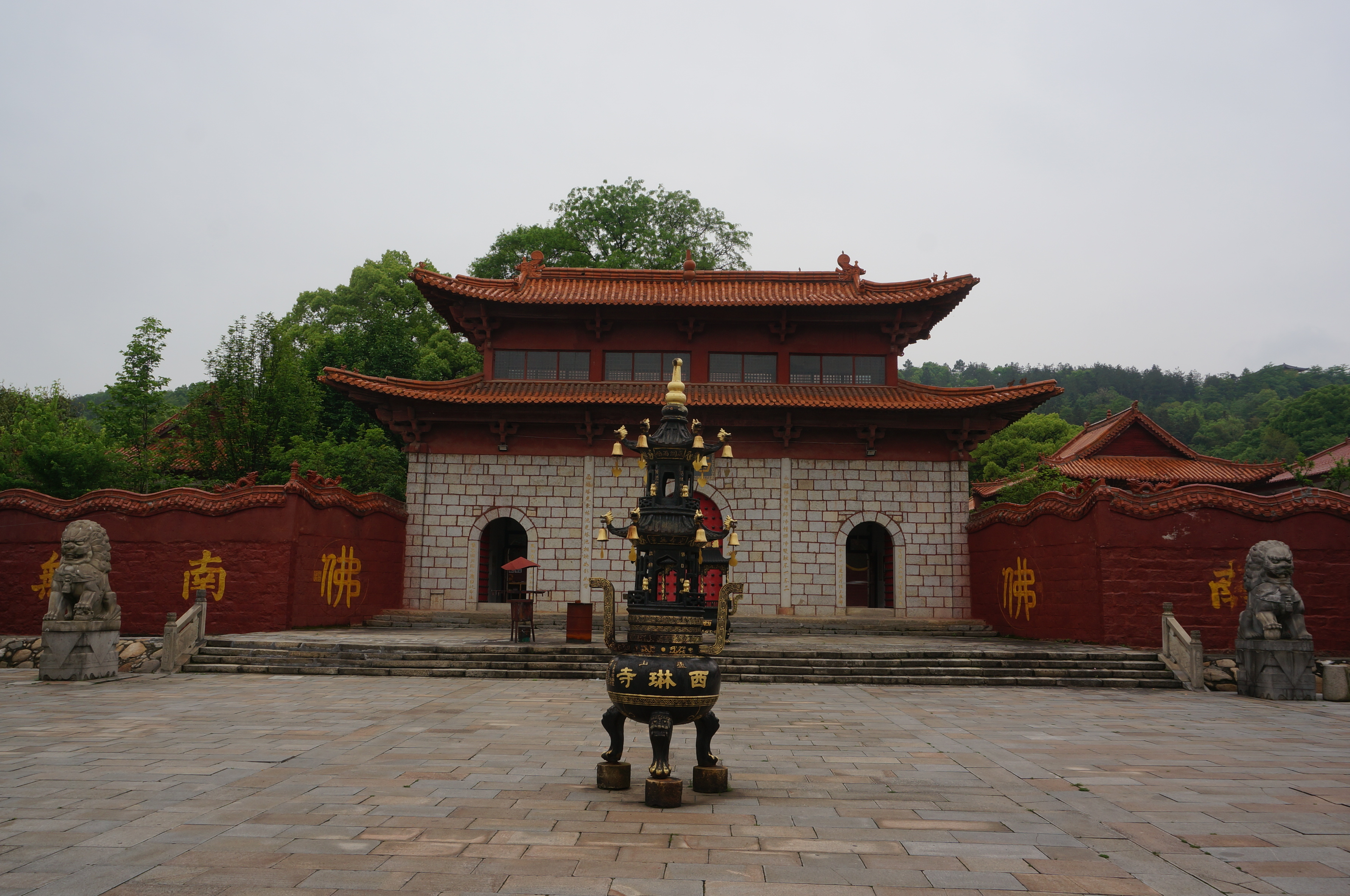
- The Shanmen of Xilin Temple.

Religion
- Affiliation: Buddhism
- Sect: Linji school
- Leadership: Shi Juehai (释觉海)

Location
- Location: Mount Lu, Jiujiang, Jiangxi
- Country: China
- Interactive map of Xilin Temple
- Coordinates: 29°34′27″N 115°58′57″E

Architecture
- Style: Chinese architecture
- Founder: Tao Fan
- Established: 366
- Completed: 1996 (reconstruction)

Xilin Temple (Chinese: 西林寺 or 西琳寺; pinyin: Xīlín Sì) is a Buddhist temple located on Mount Lu, in Jiujiang, Jiangxi, China.

== History ==
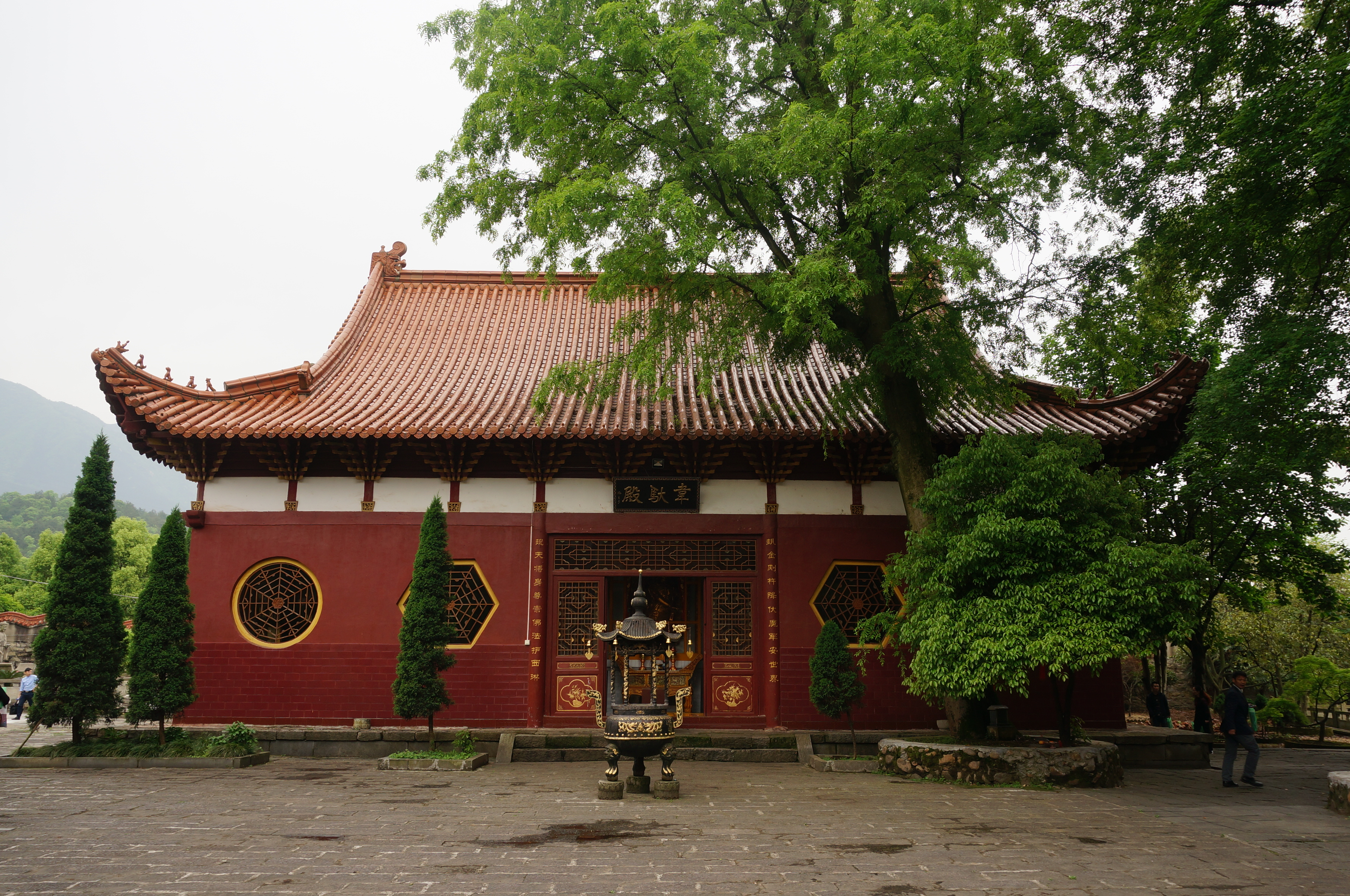
The Four Heavenly Kings Hall.

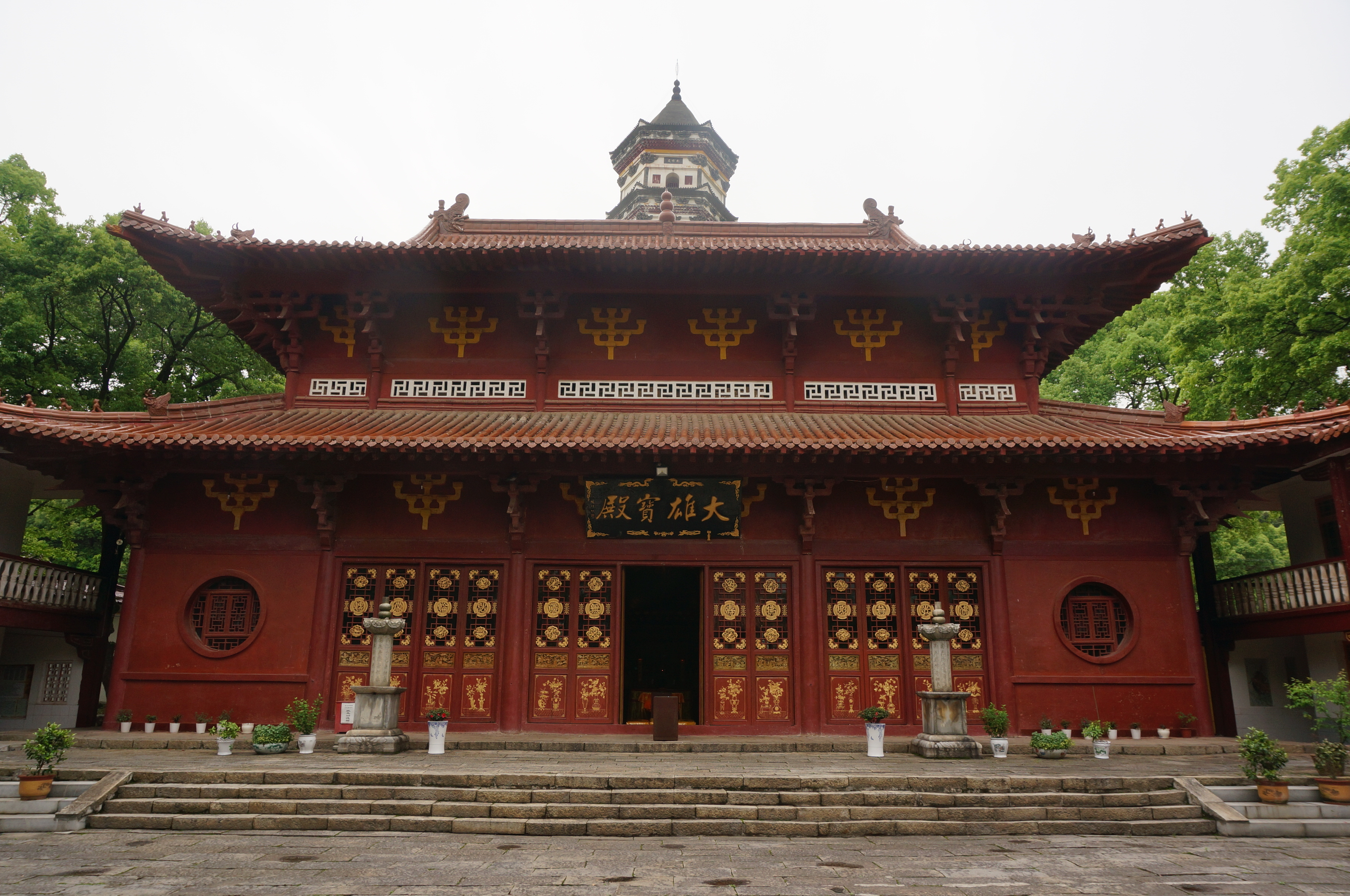
The Mahavira Hall.

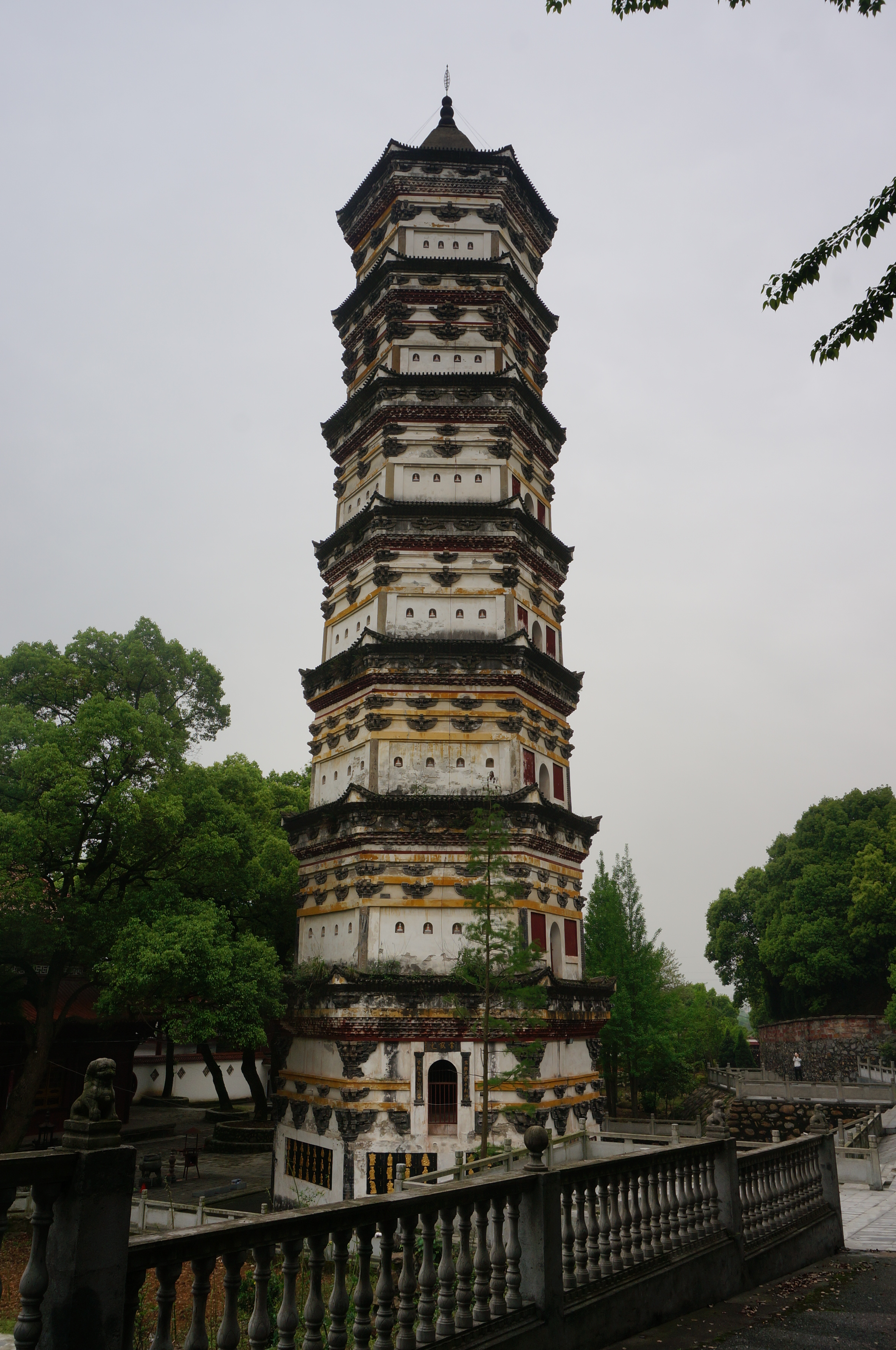
The Thousand Buddha Pagoda.

=== Ancient China ===
Xilin Temple was originally built in 366 by an official named Tao Fan (陶范), during the Eastern Jin dynasty (317–420). In the Tang dynasty (618–907), Emperor Xuanzong issued the decree rebuilding the temple. In the Song dynasty (960–1179), Emperor Taizong inscribed and honored the name "Qianming Chan Temple" (乾明禅寺). It became one of the Three Famous Buddhist Temples on Mount Lu, alongside Donglin Temple and Dalin Temple (大林寺). The temple had reached unprecedented heyday during that time. Since the Yuan dynasty (1127–1368), over the course of 700 years, the temple was destroyed and rebuilt many times. Xilin Temple was devastated by the Mongolian invasion in 1292 and rebuilt in 1381, at the dawn of Ming dynasty (1368–1644). In 1854, during the reign of Xianfeng Emperor of the Qing dynasty (1644–1911), Xilin Temple was completely damaged during the Taiping Rebellion. Seven years later, monk Lusong (麓松) restored the temple.

=== Modern China ===
It was gradually fell into ruin in the Republic of China (1911–1949).

During the Cultural Revolution, the remaining halls and rooms of Xilin Temple was demolished by the Red Guards. The foundation was used as vegetable garden.

In 1989, Taiwanese Bhikkhunī Shi Juehai (释觉海) returned to mainland China to visit relatives. When she saw the abandoned temple, she planned to rebuild it. In September 1989, the reconstruction project were launched. The reconstruction project was carried out in two phases. From September 1989 to September 1992, it was the first phase of the project. During this period, 10 mu of land was purchased, the Thousand Buddha Pagoda was restored, Shanmen, Mahavira Hall, the left and right squatter houses, reception room, dining halls were newly built, and a stone brick wall of 3.5 metres high was built at 900 metres. From December 1992 to October 1996, the second phase of the project was completed. The Four Heavenly Kings Hall, Amitabha Buddha Hall, Ksitigarbha Hall, Guanyin Hall, Buddhist Texts Library, Lobby Hall and Dining Hall were added to the temple.

== Architecture ==
=== Thousand Buddha Pagoda ===
The Thousand Buddha Pagoda was originally built in the ruling of Emperor Xuanzong of the Tang dynasty (618–907) and rebuilt in 1631, during the 4th year of Chongzhen Emperor's reign in the Ming dynasty (–). A modern restoration of the pagoda was carried out in 2005. The seven storeys, 46-metre (151 ft) tall, hexagonal-based Chinese pagoda is made of brick and stone. Over 250 exquisite niches with small statues of Buddha are carved on the body of the pagoda.

== Culture ==
Song dynasty poet Su Shi eulogized a poem "Writing on the wall of a hall at Xilin Temple" (题西林壁) after visiting the temple. It is selected in primary school textbook.
