= White Wind Zen Community =

Zen community in Ontario, Canada

Coordinates: 45.4289°N 75.6818°W

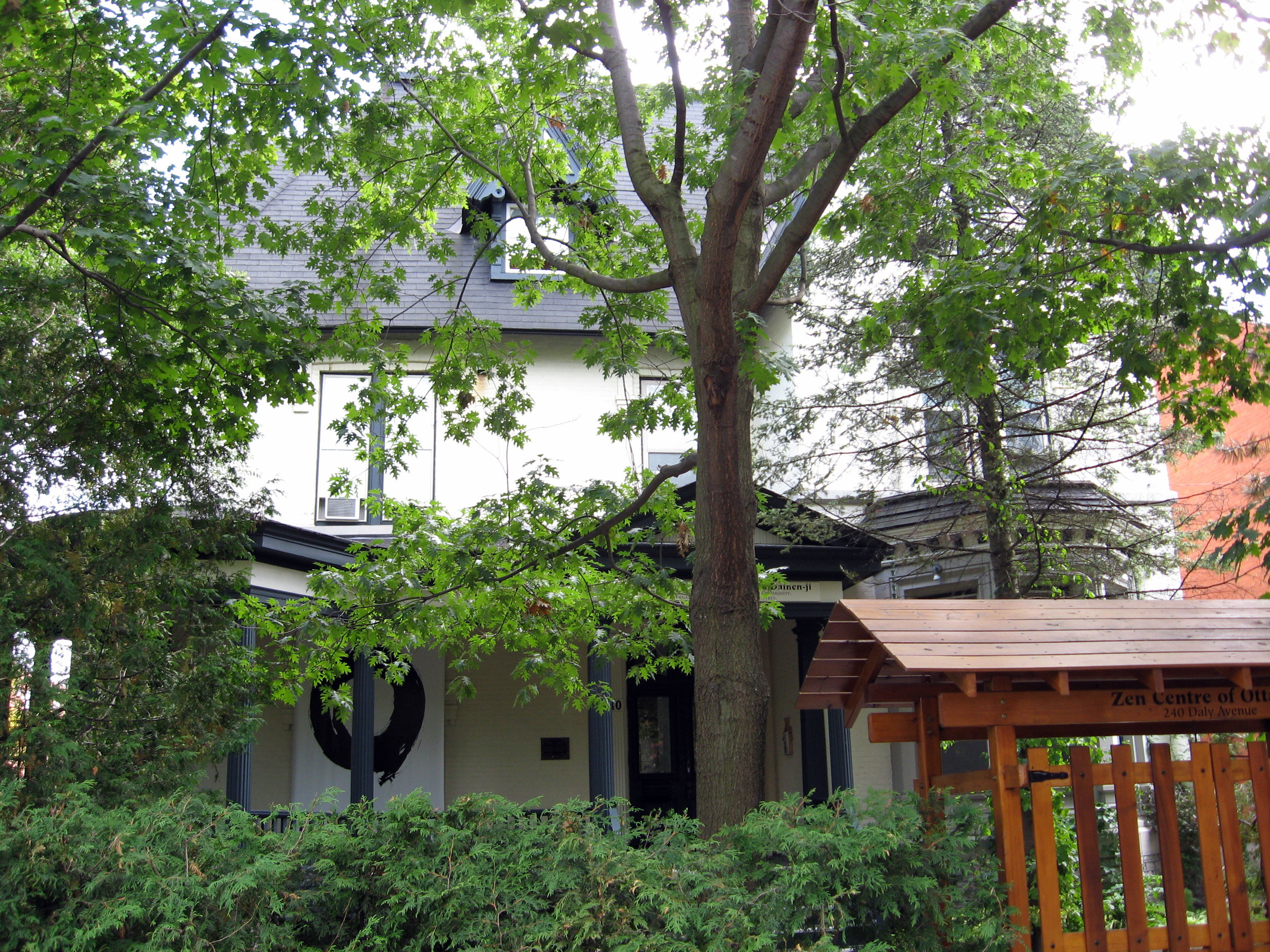
The Zen Centre of Ottawa, where the community is based.

The White Wind Zen Community (WWZC) is based at the Zen Centre of Ottawa (Honzan Dainen-ji) in Ottawa, Ontario, with branch centres in Wolfville, Nova Scotia and Harrow, England. The Community is led by the Venerable Anzan Hoshin roshi. It consists of both a monastic order, the Northern Mountain Order, and a large community of associate, general, and formal lay students.

The WWZC was founded in 1985 as the White Wind Zazenkai (Hakukaze Zazenkai), named after the Hakukaze-ji monastery of Anzan Hoshin roshi's teacher, the late Ven. Yasuda Joshu Dainen Hakukaze. The association was renamed "White Wind Zen Community" in 1989. While Anzan Hoshin roshi is still in permanent residence at the Ottawa centre, he retired from public teaching in 1991 and currently teaches only monastic and formal students. Lay teaching is currently performed by his Dharma-successors, the Ven. Shikai Zuiko o-sensei and the Ven. Jinmyo Renge osho, and by practice advisors trained by Anzan Hoshin roshi.

In addition to offering an intensive schedule of practice year-round, including sittings, sesshin and outreach of a Western Zen centre, the WWZC provides a large number of individual students outside of commuting distance of the monastery or its branches with long-distance training. The long-distance training program provides students practice interviews and daisan via e-mail, telephone, or letter, and grants students access to a library of over 2000 recorded dharma talks. The WWZC also publishes books and audio recordings through its publishing arm, Great Matter Publications.

== See also ==
- Buddhism in Canada
- Buddhism in the United States
