= Ajahn Sona =

Canadian Theravada Buddhist monk (born 1954)

- Title: Abbot of Birken Forest Monastery

Personal life
- Born: Tom West; 1954 (age 71–72) Canada
- Occupation: Buddhist monk, author
- Website: birken.ca

Religious life
- Religion: Buddhism
- School: Theravada
- Lineage: Thai Forest Tradition
- Dharma name: Sona

Senior posting
- Teacher: Ven. Gunaratana
- Based in: Birken Forest Monastery, British Columbia, Canada

Ajahn Sona (born Tom West, 1954) is a Canadian Theravada Buddhist monk of the Thai Forest Tradition, founder and abbot of Birken Forest Monastery (Sītavana) in British Columbia, Canada, the first monastery of the tradition established in the country. He is known for his widely followed online teachings, with a YouTube channel that by 2026 had over 37,000 subscribers, and as a contributor to the Buddhist media outlet Buddhistdoor Global.

== Biography ==
Born in Canada in 1954 as Tom West, Sona worked as a classical guitarist before his ordination. His encounter with Buddhist wisdom as a young man initiated a spiritual journey that led him to become a lay hermit in the Coast Mountain region of British Columbia for several years. He subsequently ordained as a Theravada monk in 1989 under Ven. Gunaratana at the Bhavana Society in West Virginia, where his first years of training took place. He further trained for over three years at monasteries following Ajahn Chah in northeast Thailand, especially Wat Pah Nanachat.

== Birken Forest Monastery ==
Upon his return to Canada in 1994, Sona helped found the original Birken Forest Monastery near Pemberton, along the Birkenhead River, together with Bhikkhu Piyadhammo. It was the first monastery of the Thai Forest Tradition in Canada. The monastery later moved to a second location northeast of Princeton and, under Sona's guidance as its spiritual leader, went through each stage of its growth. It is currently located on an eighty-acre property surrounded by forest, about forty kilometres south of Kamloops, at an elevation of some 1,200 metres.

The monastery has been the subject of academic study: the article "A Monastery for Laypeople: Birken Forest Monastery and the Monasticization of Convert Theravada in Cascadia", published in the Journal of Global Buddhism in 2022, analyzes how Sona "in effect created a lay village" to establish a monastery in Birken's isolated, non-Buddhist environs, and identifies him as "a Canadian convert monk born Tom West in 1954."

Sona has also been an advocate of environmental sustainability at the monastery, a theme he presented in a 2011 talk at TEDxOkanaganCollege. A 2018 YouTube video he made on energy efficiency at Birken described the main building as roughly 80 per cent more energy-efficient than typical residential buildings in Canada. The monastery was visited by the Canadian public broadcaster CBC in 2016, whose reporter toured the grounds and interviewed Sona.

== Teaching ==
Sona's YouTube channel, founded in 2013, features his talks and has accumulated over 5.4 million views, and he has contributed articles to Buddhistdoor Global. He has also contributed to Tricycle: The Buddhist Review, one of the main English-language Buddhist magazines. He is the author of several books, including Bloom: Buddhist Reflections on Serenity and Love (Sumeru Press, 2020, ISBN 978-1896559605), What Comes Before Mindfulness?: Effective Effort: How to Garden Your Inner Life (Birken Publications, 2023), and Life Is a Near Death Experience: Skills for Illness, Aging, Dying, and Loss (2021, ISBN 979-8503933680). He has also been a guest of the Clear Mountain Monastery podcast, where the monks of that community credited him with coining the term "New Gandhara" for the Pacific Northwest as a region where Theravada Buddhism is flourishing. In 2013 he withdrew from his duties for a full year of solitary retreat at the monastery, following the forest tradition practice of senior monks spending extended periods in seclusion.

== See also ==
- Birken Forest Buddhist Monastery
- Thai Forest Tradition
- Ajahn Chah
