= Kṣitigarbha Hall =

Building in East Asian Buddhist temples dedicated to Kṣitigarbha

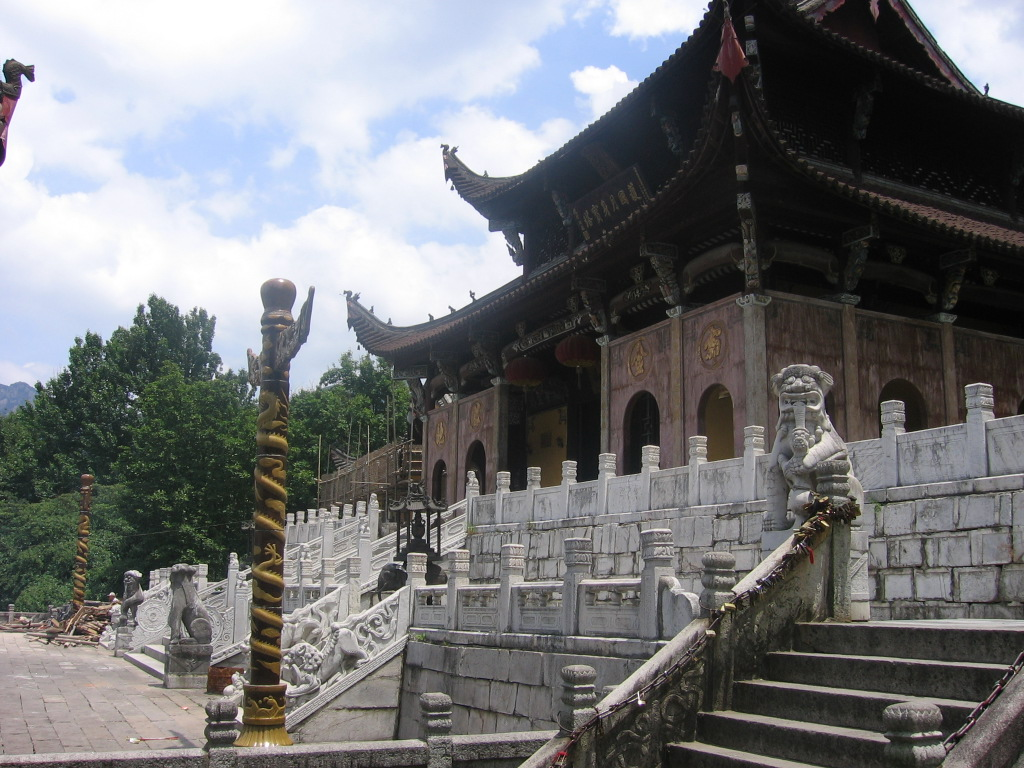
- The Kṣitigarbha Hall at Shrine of Living Buddha, in Mount Jiuhua, Anhui, China.

Chinese name
- Traditional Chinese: 地藏殿
- Simplified Chinese: 地藏殿
Transcriptions
Standard Mandarin
- Hanyu Pinyin: Dìzàngdiàn

Vietnamese name
- Vietnamese alphabet: Chùa Địa Tạng
- Chữ Hán: 地藏堂

Korean name
- Hangul: 지장전
- Hanja: 地蔵殿
Transcriptions
- Revised Romanization: Jijangjeon
- McCune–Reischauer: Chijangjŏn

Japanese name
- Kanji: 地蔵堂
Transcriptions
- Romanization: Jizō-dō

The Kṣitigarbha Hall is a building in East Asian Buddhist temples dedicated to Kṣitigarbha, who revered for his vow to deliver beings from the suffering of the six realms, particularly hell. As a key auxiliary structure in East Asian Buddhist temples, it embodies the fusion of doctrinal teachings, cultural narratives, and artistic traditions. This hall serves as a focal point for rituals addressing death, ancestor veneration, and moral redemption. In Chinese Buddhist temples, they are usually termed the Dizang dian or Dizang Hall. In Japanese Buddhist temples, they are usually termed the Jizōdō or Jizō-den. In Korean Buddhist temples, they are usually termed the Jijangjeon, In Vietnamese Buddhist temples, they are usually termed the Chùa Địa Tạng.

== Origin ==
Kṣitigarbha is a bodhisattva most closely associated with the salvation and liberation of hell-beings. He features prominently in many Mahayana sūtras, such as the Kṣitigarbha Bodhisattva Pūrvapraṇidhāna Sūtra (地藏菩薩本願經)..

The Daśacakra Kṣitigarbha Sūtra (地藏十輪經) elaborates:

"Kṣitigarbha is patient and immovable like the great earth; his meditation is deep and profound like a secret storehouse."
(「安忍不動如大地，靜慮深密如秘藏。」)

Due to Śākyamuni Buddha's exhortations, Kṣitigarbha has to cultivate all the living creatures in adherence to the Dharma and eliminate all suffering in the period spanning from Śākyamuni Buddha's Parinirvana to Maitreya's final birth. Kṣitigarbha has made the vow:

"Until the hells are empty (of suffering beings), I will not become a Buddha."
(「地獄不空，誓不成佛。」)
"Once all sentient beings are saved, I will attain Buddhahood."
(「眾生度盡，方證菩提。」)
"If I do not descend into hell, who will?"
(「我不入地獄，誰入地獄?」)

It is through this gesture of selflessness that he became recognized as "foremost in compassion and vows" and has been worshiped by people since ancient times.

== China ==
The veneration of Kṣitigarbha in China flourished during the Tang dynasty (618–907 CE), closely linked to the legend of Kim Gyo-gak, a Korean prince who traveled to Jiuhua Mountain in Anhui for ascetic practice. Regarded as the earthly manifestation of Kṣitigarbha, his preserved body enshrined at Shrine of Living Buddha solidified the site as a premier pilgrimage center. Doctrinally, the Daśacakrakṣitigarbha-sūtra underpins the hall's role in repentance and salvation rituals.

In Chinese Buddhism, Kṣitigarbha's image is usually in the form of a Buddhist monk; complete with a robe, shaved head or in a Five Buddha Crown (五佛冠; Wǔfóguān), also known as a Vairocana-crown (毗卢帽; Pílú mào), which is a crown adorned with images of the Five Tathāgatas. He sits in the lotus posture and wields a khakkhara in his left hand, symbolizing the unification of compassion for all living creations whilst holding strictly to the moral precepts. In his right hand is a ruyi, signifying the fulfillment of the wishes of all living creatures. Some images depict him standing in a triad that includes a father-son duo: Daoming (道明), a bhikshu who stands to his left, and Mingong (憫公), a wealthy elderly man on his right. In some larger Buddhist temples, statues of the Ten Yanluo Wangs flank images of Kṣitigarbha.

== Japan ==
In Japan, worship of Kṣitigarbha gained prominence in the Heian Period (794–1185), syncretizing with indigenous customs to protect deceased children and travelers. The Mibudera in Kyoto emerged as a center for Kṣitigarbha devotion by the 10th century, while the Saifukuji Jizōdō in Tokyo, built in 1407, exemplifies Zen Buddhism-inspired architecture designated as a National Treasure. Kṣitigarbha in Japan often appears as a gentle, child-like figure adorned with red bibs and caps, offered to comfort departed souls.

== Korea ==
In Korea, worship of Kṣitigarbha integrated with Korean folk beliefs underworld concepts, expanded during the Goryeo dynasty (918–1392). The Bukjijangsa in Daegu, established in 485, is among the oldest dedicated temples, while the Seonunsa Jijangbosalsang (선운사 지장보살상, 禪雲寺地藏菩薩像) from the late Goryeo era showcases Mongolian-Turfan artistic influences. Kṣitigarbha statues wears a hooded scarf and jeweled ornaments, holds a dharma wheel to signify liberating beings from cyclic existence, reflecting Central Asian styles.

== Vietnam ==
Vietnamese Kṣitigarbha worship incorporates Mahayana Buddhism doctrines with local animism, focusing on filial piety and ghost salvation. The Kṣitigarbha Flying Temple (地藏飛來寺, Chùa Địa Tạng Phi Lai) in Hanoi, renovated in 2015, exemplifies modern ecological Buddhism while retaining historical legacies linked to Trần dynasty emperors, with Kṣitigarbha Hall enshrining a majestic Kṣitigarbha statue.
