= Daoming =

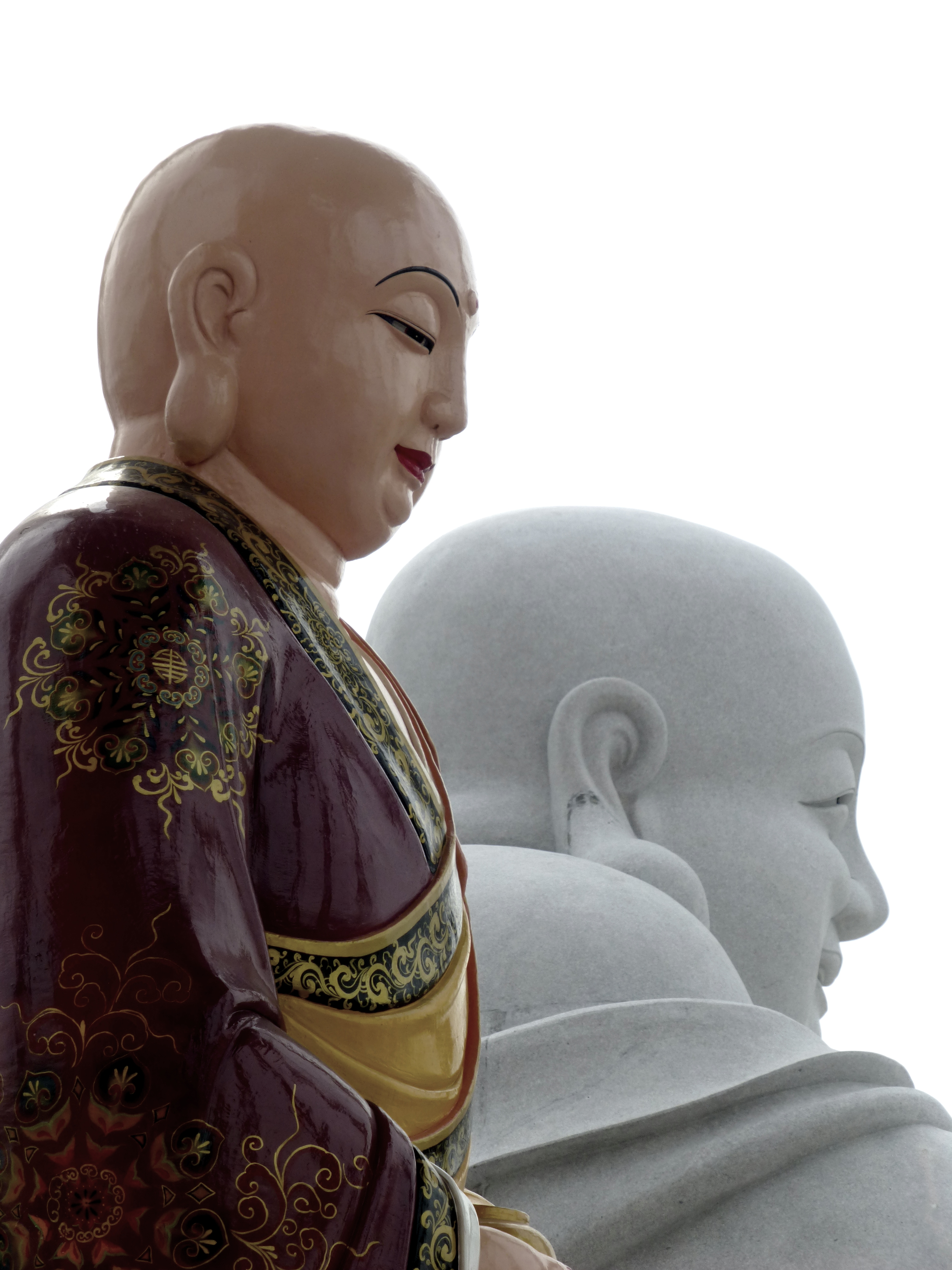
Daoming

Daoming (道明) was a Chinese Buddhist monk and the left attendant of the bodhisattva Kṣitigarbha. His father also entered the way of the bodhisattva and became his disciple and the right attendant, Mingong.

== Legends ==
The name "Daoming" was fairly common, and surviving sources contain biographies of over a dozen Buddhist monks with this name. The recurrence of the name among Buddhist monks was acknowledged in the Record of a Returned Soul that explains how the underworld authorities mistook Daoming of Kaishan Monastery for Daoming of Longxing Monastery for a discussion of the various Daomings' related death and afterlife.

According to the "Record of a Returned Soul", Daoming, a monk who lived in the Kaishan Monastery in Xiang, was summoned to hell by mistake in 778 AD. Before he returned to Earth, he saw a monk who announced that he was Kșitigarbha. Kșitigarbha asked him to propagate throughout the world his true image – that is to say, with the head-dress.

According to the local tradition, Daoming was the son of Mingong, a wealthy man and landowner of the Mount Jiuhua. Mingong donated all peaks of his mountain to monk Dizang for use as a place of worship where dharma was taught. He even asked his son to accompany Dizang to become a Buddhist monk who was also subsequently called Daoming. His father also became a follower of Dizang. Soon after that, he became enlightened.
