= Wutai Shan Buddhist Garden =

Buddhist temple in Cavan Monaghan, Ontario, Canada

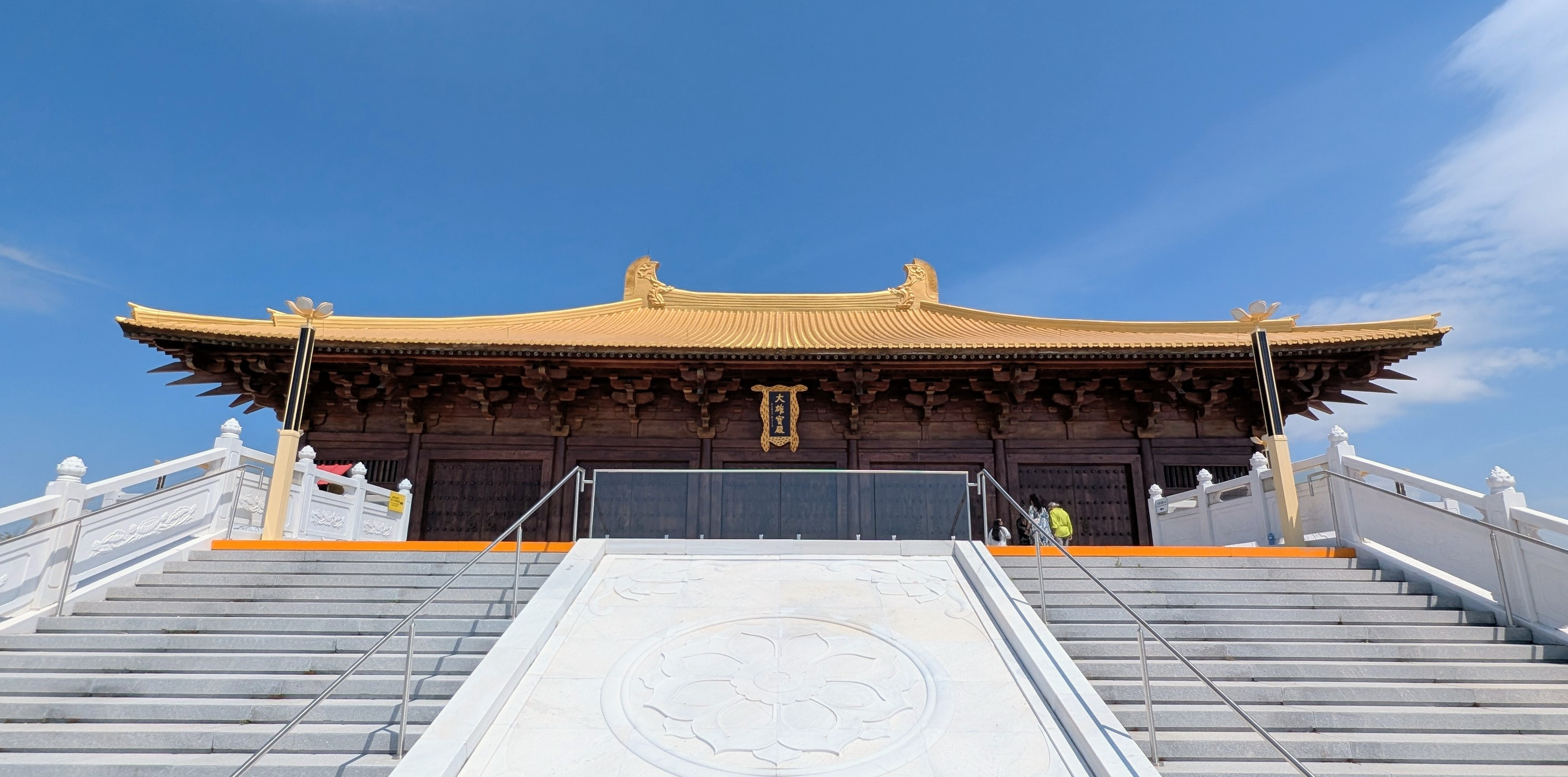

Religion
- Affiliation: Mahayana

Location
- Location: 708 Ski Hill Road, Cavan Monaghan, Ontario; L5N 7K6
- Interactive map of Wutai Shan Buddhist Garden
- Coordinates: 44.24°N 78.57°W

Architecture
- Type: Temple
- Style: Chinese
- Groundbreaking: 2011

Website
- Official website

Wutai Shan Buddhist Garden (Chinese: 加國五台山, "Wutaishan Canada") is a Chinese Buddhist temple complex located in the township of Cavan Monaghan in Peterborough County, Ontario, between the communities of Omemee and Bethany. It is named after Mount Wutai, one of China's four Sacred Mountains of Buddhism. It is managed by the Buddhist Association of Canada and houses the Buddhist College of Canada.

== History ==
In 1990, the Buddhist Association of Canada headquartered at the Cham Shan Temple in Thornhill, Ontario, purchased four plots of land totalling 550 hectares (1,350 acres) in Victoria and Peterborough Counties in Central Ontario, with the intention of building four pilgrimage sites mirroring the four Sacred Mountains of Buddhism in China. Wutai Shan Buddhist Garden was the first site to be developed, with its groundbreaking ceremony held on May 28, 2011. The complete project is estimated to cost 80,000,000 Canadian dollars; as of 2016, $37 million had been invested into the project. The statue of the bodhisattva Maitreya at the entrance to the complex was consecrated on June 19, 2017, and the Main Hall was consecrated on October 5, 2019.

Wutai Shan Buddhist Garden was closed to the public during the COVID-19 pandemic from 2020 to 2024. On July 24, 2022, a fire at the Hall of Dizang that was under construction caused over $1.8 million in damage. The Hall of Guanyin was consecrated on October 6, 2022, and the rebuilt Hall of Dizang was consecrated on November 20, 2024.

== Site description ==
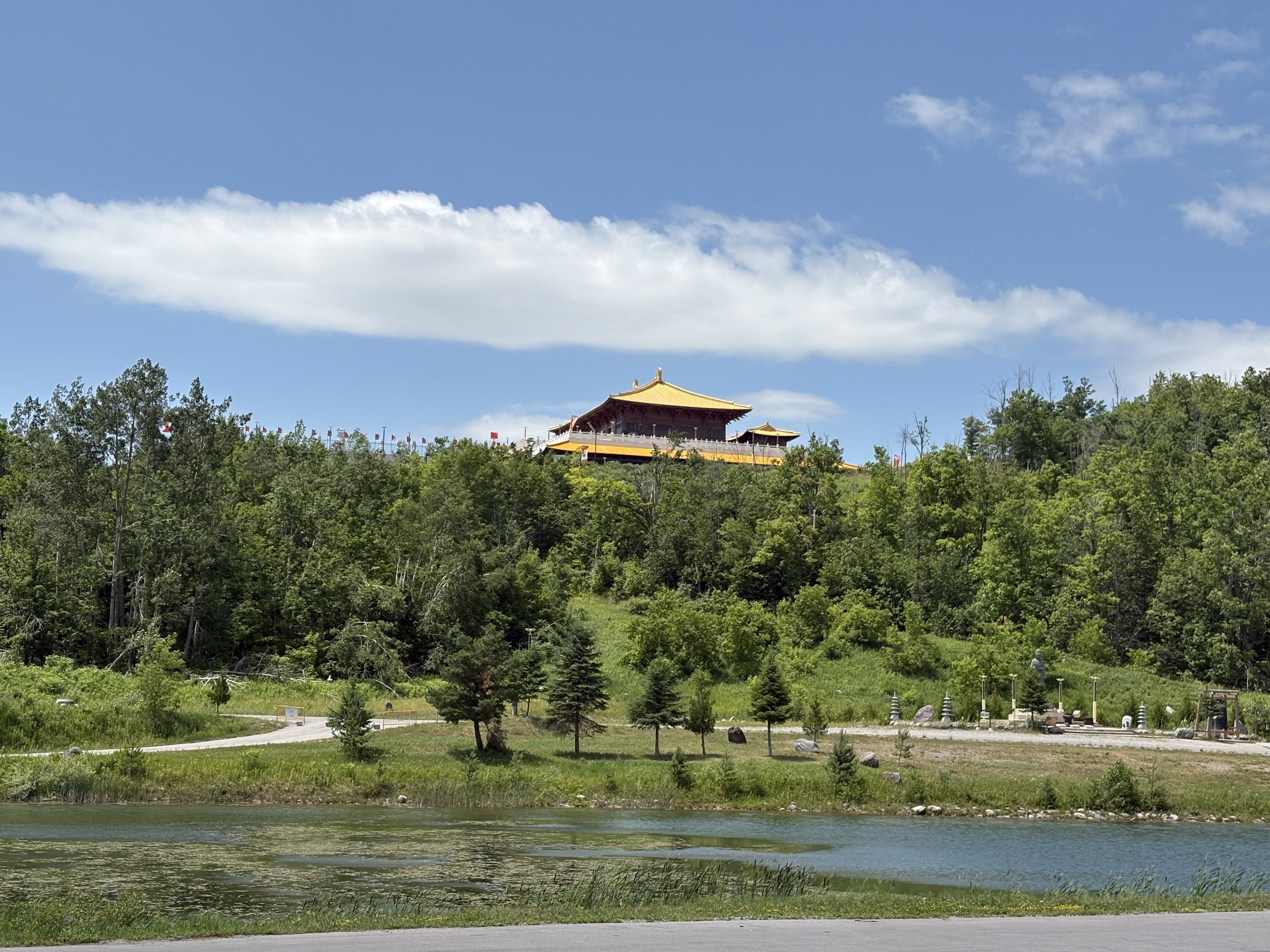
The Main Hall viewed from Wisdom Lake

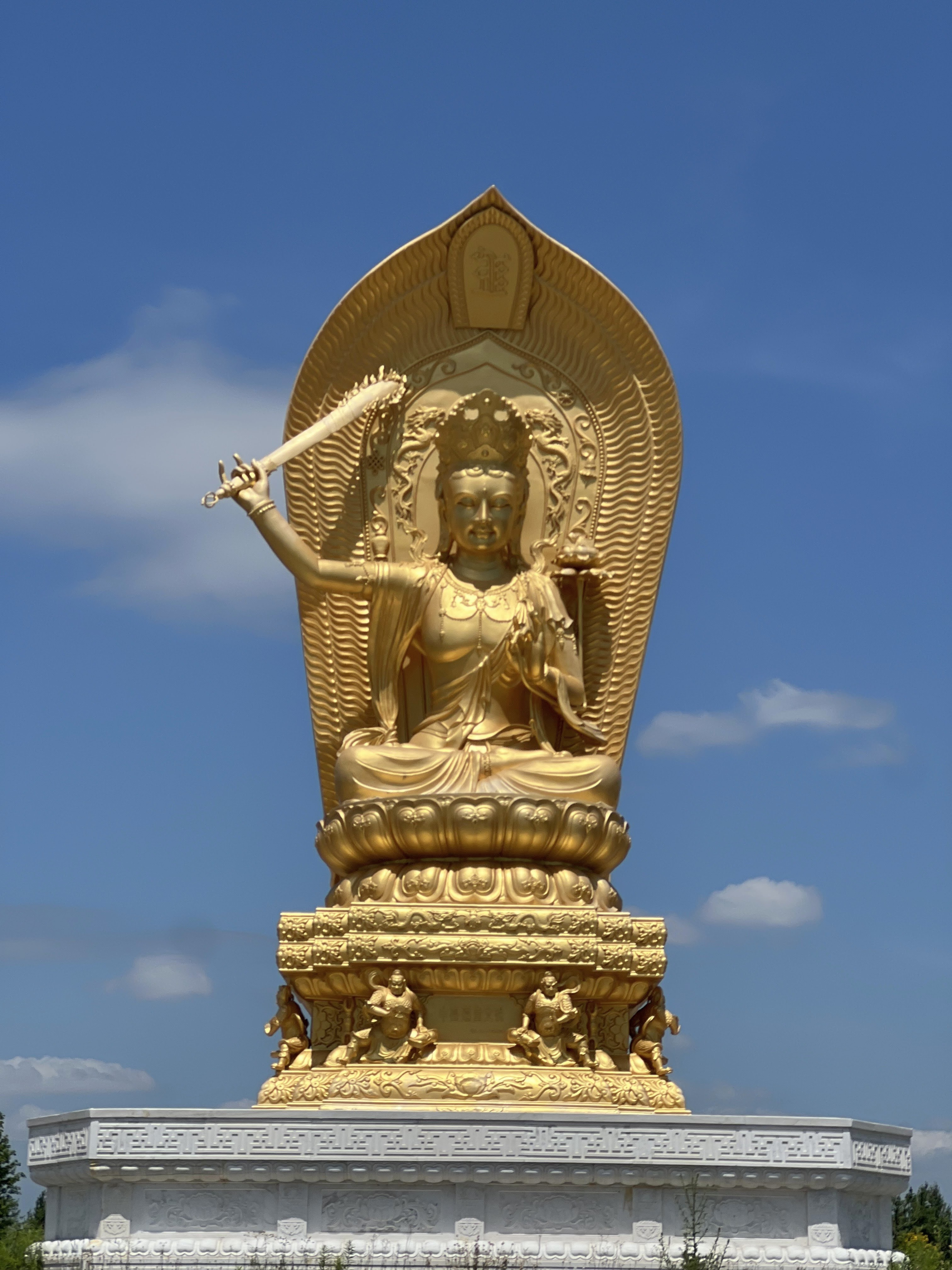
Sculpture of Manjushri on the central platform of Wutai Shan Buddhist Garden

Wutai Shan Buddhist Garden covers an area of 217 hectares (535 acres), making it the largest Chinese Buddhist site in Canada. The entrance gate is located on the west side of the property on Ski Hill Road, near that road's intersection with the Ganaraska Hiking Trail. A stone sculpture of Maitreya measuring 13 metres (43 ft) tall and weighing over 700 tonnes is placed near the entrance. An ensemble of wooden temples built in Tang Chinese style sits on the slope of a drumlin in the middle of the property. Like most Chinese temples, they are oriented on a north–south axis. East of the temples is Wisdom Lake, a spring-fed pond measuring 600 by 70 metres (1,970 by 230 ft), surrounded by stupas and sculptures.

Five platforms supporting gilt bronze statues of different forms of Manjushri are placed around the complex, reflecting its namesake (Wutai means "five terraces" in Chinese) and its traditional identification as the daochang of Manjushri. The most central of these platforms is located at the highest point of the complex at 353 metres (1,158 ft) above sea level. Near it are statues of 500 arhats and Guru Padmasambhava, as well as Tibetan prayer flags and prayer wheels.

== Temple architecture ==
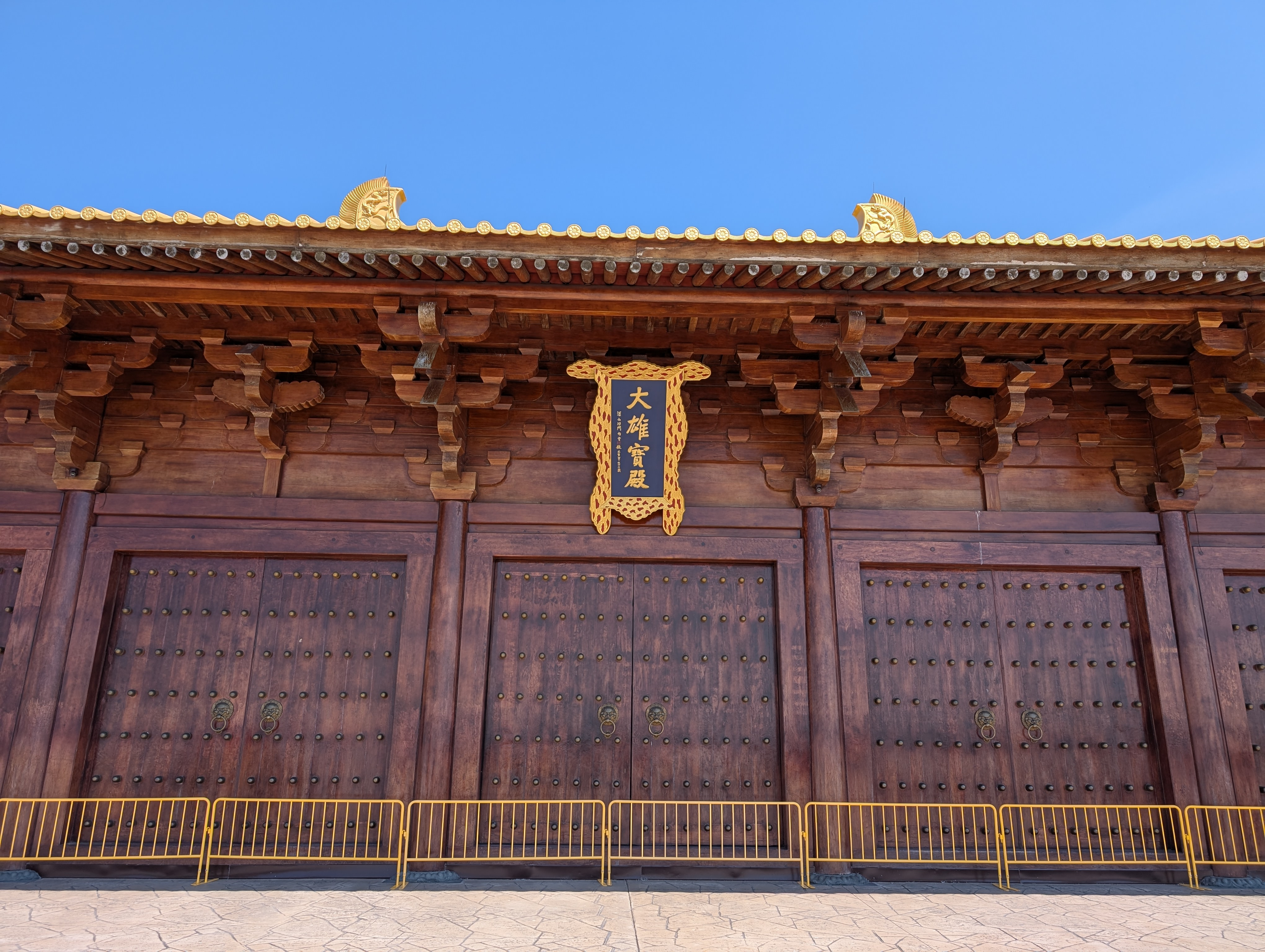
South side of the Main Hall

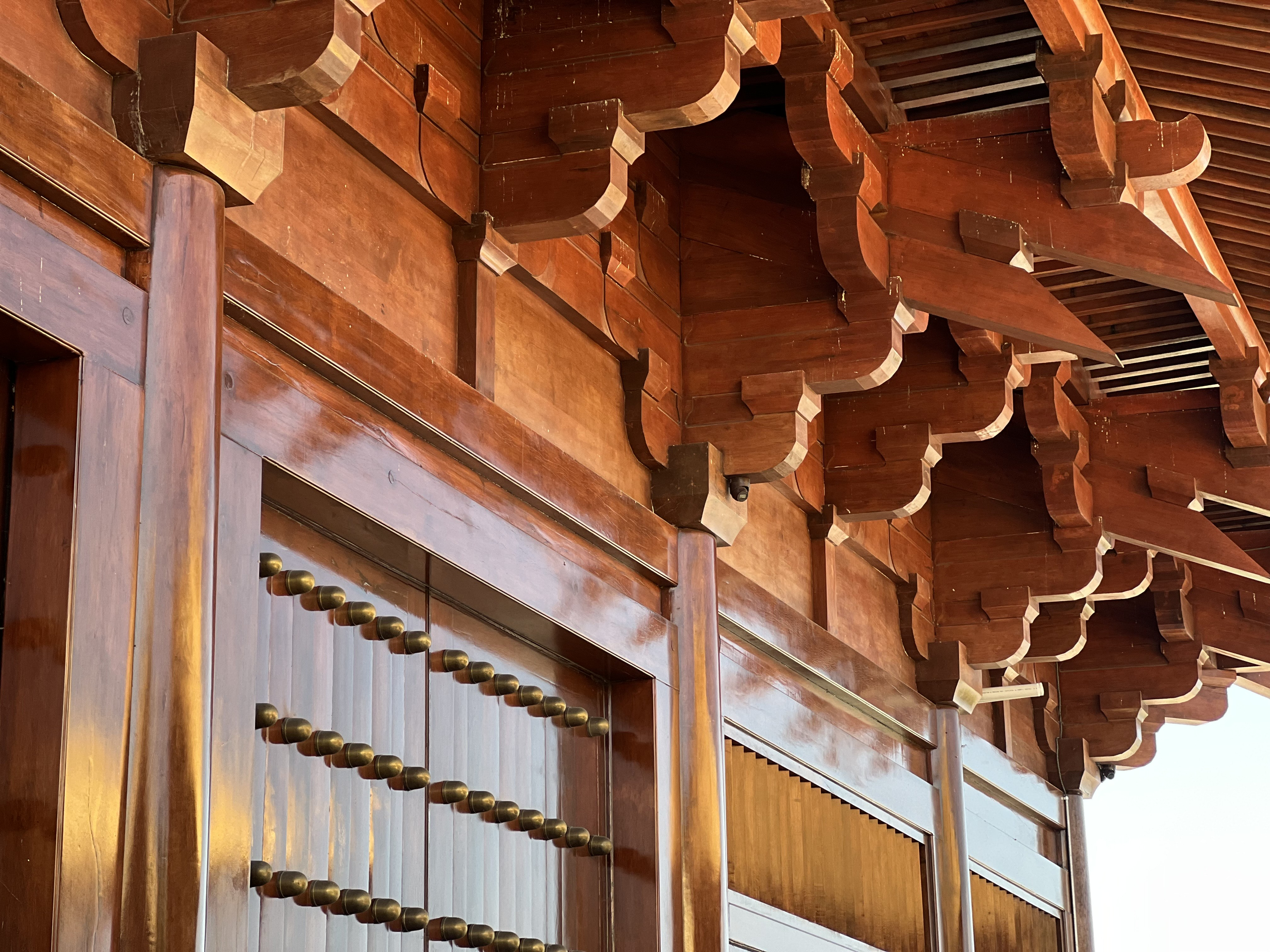
Dougong joinery supporting the roof of the Main Hall

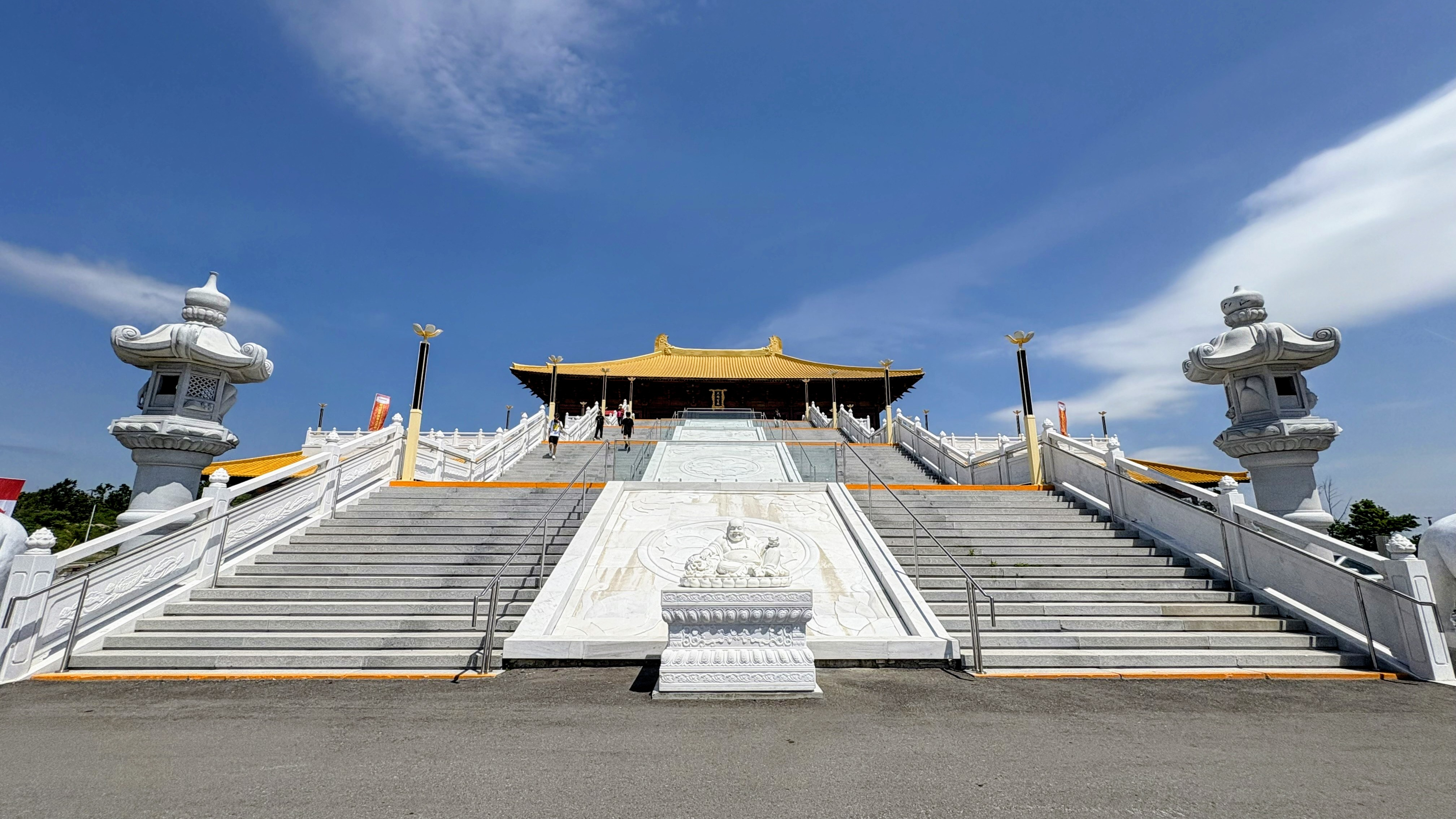
Staircase leading up to Main Hall

The wooden temples at Wutai Shan are built in the style of the Tang dynasty using the traditional techniques of Chinese architecture, including the use of nail-free dougong mortise-and-tenon joinery. So far, three temples have been built: the Main Hall, the Hall of Guanyin, and the Hall of Dizang.

The wooden Main Hall sits on the top level of a three-storey concrete building. The first and second levels contain memorial and exhibition halls, administrative areas, living quarters, and reception areas. A 930-square-metre (10,000 sq ft) plaza is located outside the first floor, and currently serves as a parking lot. A staircase of 108 steps connects the Main Hall to the plaza.

The Main Hall occupies over 740 square metres (8,000 sq ft) and is modelled after the Great East Hall of Foguang Temple at Mount Wutai in China. The main wood used in its construction is rosewood from Laos. The roof is covered with 24,220 bronze shingles that weigh approximately 61 tonnes. The shingles are inscribed with blessings from the patrons who sponsored them. The total weight of the entire structure of the roof is about 600 tonnes. Three Buddha sculptures sit on a Sumeru throne in the middle of the hall: the Medicine Buddha in the east, Shakyamuni Buddha in the centre, and Amitabha Buddha in the west. Flanking these Buddhas are sculptures of the bodhisattvas Manjushri and Samantabhadra.

Located on the south side of the Main Hall are the Hall of Guanyin and Hall of Dizang. They each occupy 460 square metres (5,000 sq ft), and enshrine their eponymous bodhisattvas Guanyin and Dizang. Additional structures, including the shanmen entrance gate, the Hall of Four Heavenly Kings and the Hall of Manjushri, will be built in the future further down the slope south of the current temples.

== Activities ==
Wutai Shan Buddhist Garden is open to visitors five days a week from mid-April to mid-November. The Buddhist College of Canada located at Wutai Shan offers continuing education programs in partnership with Emmanuel College at the University of Toronto.
