= Ajahn Viradhammo =

Canadian Theravada Buddhist monk (b. 1947)

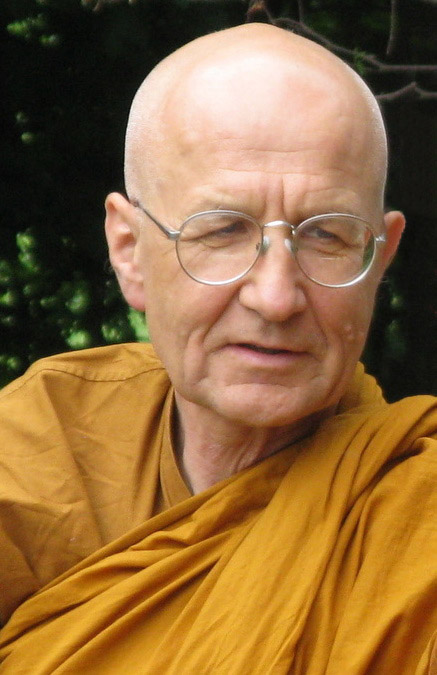
- Viradhammo in 2010

Personal life
- Born: Vitauts Akers; April 27, 1947 (age 79) Germany
- Other name: Luang Por Viradhammo

Religious life
- Religion: Buddhist
- School: Theravada

Senior posting
- Teacher: Ajahn Chah
- Based in: Tisarana Monastery, Perth, Ontario
- Website: tisarana.ca

Ajahn Viradhammo or Luang Por Viradhammo (born Vitauts Akers, April 27, 1947) is a Canadian monk in the Thai forest tradition of Theravada Buddhism. He was ordained as a monk in 1974 by Ajahn Chah at Wat Nong Pah Pong monastery and became one of the first residents at Wat Pah Nanachat, the international monastery in north-east Thailand. Luang Por Viradhammo is the most senior Thai Forest monk in Canada and currently the Abbot of Tisarana Buddhist Monastery in Perth, Ontario. Luang Por means Venerable Father (หลวงพ่อ), an honorific and term of affection in keeping with Thai custom; ajahn means teacher.

== Biography ==
Ajahn Viradhammo was born Vitauts Akers in a displaced persons camp in Esslingen, Germany where his parents had become refugees after fleeing from the Soviet re-occupation of Latvia in 1944. He, his parents and two year older brother immigrated to Toronto, Canada in 1951.

Ajahn Viradhammo's parents were both Lutheran and he himself was confirmed in the Lutheran Church. His early experiences of silence and pure awareness Chaitanya (consciousness) came at around the age of five but it was not until much later that he was able to explain them.

He started in an Engineering program at the University of Toronto at the age of sixteen but quickly discovered that this was not his vocation and, in 1969, decided to travel to satisfy his continued search for meaning, first in North Africa and then in Europe and finally in Almora, India, near the Nepalese border. It was while reading a book by J. Krishnamurti that Ajahn Viradhammo re-lived his experiences of pure, Nondualist awareness that he had had as a child. While living in India in 1969 he met the late Sāmanera Bodhesako, who introduced him to the teachings of the Buddha, which led him to travel to Thailand and become a novice at Wat Mahathat in 1973.

== Monasteries in the UK, New Zealand and Canada ==
In 1977 Ajahn Chah asked him to join Ajahn Sumedho at the Hampstead Vihāra in London and later helped establish both the Chithurst Buddhist Monastery and Aruna Ratanagiri monastery in the UK, where he was abbot. In 1985 he was invited by the Wellington Theravāda Buddhist Association to move to New Zealand where he lived for 10 years, helping build Bodhinyānārāma monastery. In 1995 he came to the UK to assist Ajahn Sumedho the then Abbot of Amarāvati. He stayed in the UK for four years before returning to New Zealand, where he lived until 2002.

Starting in 2002, Ajahn Viradhammo lived in Ottawa, caring for his mother until her death in 2011. In 2006, with the support of the Ottawa Buddhist Society, affiliated Buddhist groups in Ontario, Canada and abroad, Ajahn Viradhammo founded the Tisarana Buddhist Monastery, of which he is the abbot. The monastery is located in Perth, Ontario about one hundred kilometers southwest of Ottawa.

== Publications ==
- Viradhammo, Ajahn (2005), Stillness of Being
- Viradhammo, Ajahn (2017), The Contemplative's Craft : internalizing the teachings of the Buddha, ISBN 9780995170018
- Viradhammo, Ajahn (2024), A Contemplative’s Companion

== Audio Recordings ==
- Dhamma talks on iTunes
- Dhamma talks on Amaravati Web Site
