= Wat Mahathat =

Wat Mahathat (Thai: วัดมหาธาตุ; "Temple of Great Relic" or "Temple of Great Reliquary") is the common short name of several important Buddhist temples in Thailand. The name may refer to:

- Wat Mahathat
  - Wat Mahathat (Fak Tha, Uttaradit), Fak Tha District, Uttaradit Province
  - Wat Mahathat (Nakhon Phanom), Nakhon Phanom Province
  - Wat Mahathat (Ayutthaya), Phra Nakhon Si Ayutthaya Province
  - Wat Mahathat (Phetchaburi), Phetchaburi Province
  - Wat Mahathat (Phichai, Uttaradit), Phichai District, Uttaradit Province
  - Wat Mahathat (Ratchaburi), Ratchaburi Province
  - Wat Mahathat (Sukhothai), Sukhothai Province
  - Wat Mahathat (Yasothon), Yasothon Province
  - Wat Mahathat Yuwaratrangsarit, Bangkok
- Wat Phra Mahathat, Nakhon Si Thammarat Province
- Wat Phra Si Mahathat, Bangkok
- Wat Phra Si Rattana Mahathat
  - Wat Phra Si Rattana Mahathat (Lop Buri), Lop Buri Province
  - Wat Phra Si Rattana Mahathat, Phitsanulok Province
  - Wat Phra Si Rattana Mahathat (Ratchaburi), Ratchaburi Province
  - Wat Phra Si Rattana Mahathat, Si Satchanalai, Sukhothai Province
  - Wat Phra Si Rattana Mahathat (Suphan Buri), Suphan Buri Province
