= Mingong (deity) =

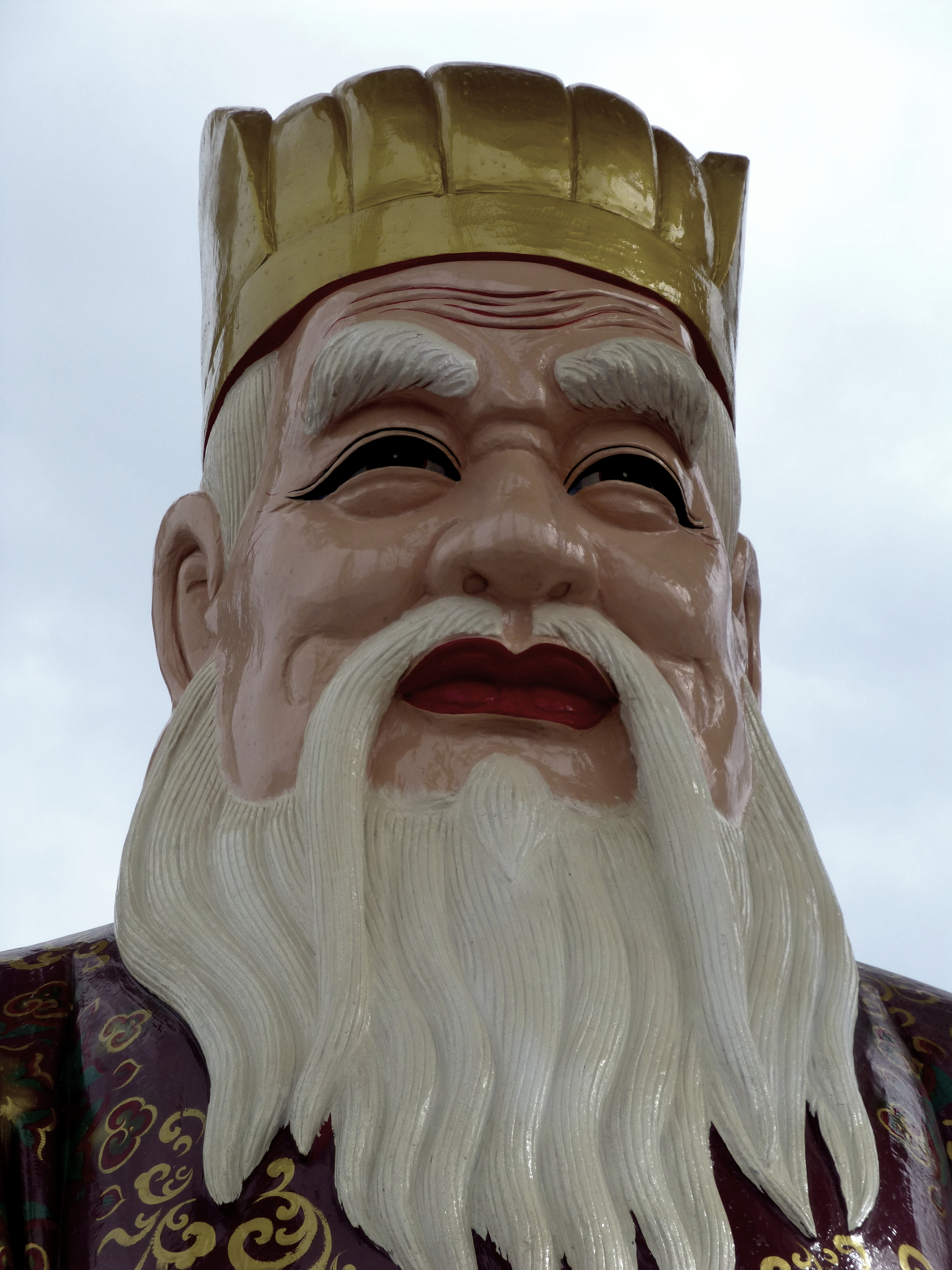
Mingong

Mingong (憫公) is a Buddhist layman and the right attendant of the bodhisattva Kṣitigarbha. His son also entered the way of the bodhisattva and became his disciple and the left attendant, Daoming. Mingong was one of the earliest converts to Buddhism and ordained by the Buddha.

== Legend ==
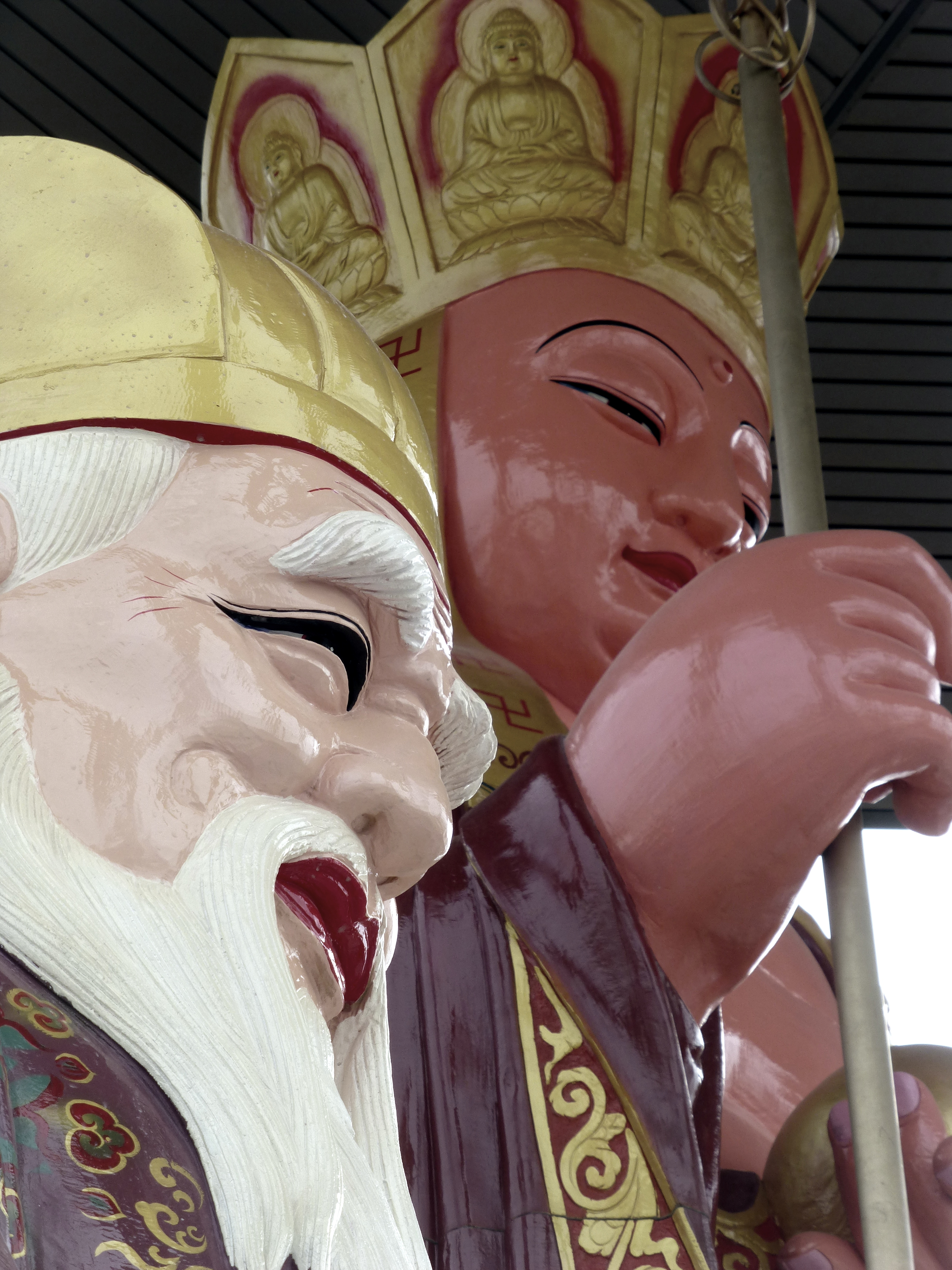
Mingong and Ksitigarbha

According to the local tradition, Mingong was a wealthy elderly man and landowner of the Mount Jiuhua. He was a very kind hearted person and enjoyed giving donations. When Dizang (Kṣitigarbha) arrived at Mount Jiuhua and requested permission to use Jiuhua for his practice, Mingong offered to give him the land. Dizang replied that he needed only as much land as his monk's cloak would cover. Surprised at Dizang's reserve, Mingong nonetheless agreed to the bargain. But when Dizang placed his cloak on the mountain it covered all nine peaks.

Finally, Mingong donated all peaks of his mountain to monk Dizang for use as a place of worship where dharma was taught. He even asked his son to accompany Dizang to become a Buddhist monk who was subsequently called Daoming. Hereinafter Mingong left his full of rich life to become a follower of Dizang. When Dizang became enlightened, he achieved immortality and became a deity.
