= Thrangu Monastery (Canada) =

Monastery in Richmond, British Columbia, Canada

- Location within British Columbia

Religion
- Affiliation: Tibetan Buddhism
- Sect: Kagyu

Location
- Location: Richmond, British Columbia, Canada
- Country: Canada
- Interactive map of Thrangu Monastery
- Coordinates: 49°09′N 123°08′W

Thrangu Monastery, Canada's first traditional Tibetan Buddhist monastery, was officially opened in Richmond, British Columbia, on July 25, 2010, by the Very Venerable Khenchen Thrangu Rinpoche, the worldwide leader of Thrangu Monasteries.

Thrangu Rinpoche is a prominent tulku (reincarnate lama) in the Kagyu school of Tibetan Buddhism, the ninth reincarnation in his particular line. His full name and title is the Very Venerable Ninth Khenchen Thrangu Tulku, Karma Lodrö Lungrik Maway Senge. "Khenchen" denotes great scholarly accomplishment, and the term "Rinpoche" is an honorific title commonly afforded to Tibetan lamas.

Thrangu Rinpoche was born in Tibet in 1933 and went to India when he was 27. Since then, he has been in residence at the Rumtek Monastery in Sikkim, India. He oversees a number of Thrangu establishments in several parts of the world. The new Canadian monastery will be under the direction of the resident lama, Lama Pema Tsewang, who was born in 1972 in Tsum, Gorkha District, Nepal. In 2002, Thrangu Rinpoche appointed him to the very high position of a "Vajra Master".

The Shrine Hall or (Lhakhang) of the monastery has 30-foot ceilings, contains Tibetan art and a four-metre (16 ft) tall gold-leaf-covered statue of Shakyamuni Buddha, "filled with precious offerings including scriptures, scrolls and sacred stones and pebbles from 108 countries, including China, Hong Kong, India, Tibet, Sri Lanka and Canada. The two side walls have 500 Medicine Buddha statues each and there are 200 Amitabha statues adjacent to the main entrance. Behind the Shakyamuni statue are the six ornaments, and the 12 mandalas are painted on the ceiling. The six pillars are decorated with traditional Tibetan designs with statues of Guru Rinpoche and Four-Arm Chenrezig on top. The shrine hall can comfortably accommodate up to 500 people."

A spokesperson said: "The central Buddha is flanked by 35 smaller Buddhas of confession and 1,000 medicine Buddhas that offer protection from illness and danger.

There are 8 retreat rooms at the monastery, where practitioners can engage in short and long term retreats, a library with texts in a number of languages, and a room for visiting teachers.

The Canadian temple is a daughter establishment of the Tibetan mother temple, Thrangu Monastery near Jyekundo or Gyêgu town in the Yushu Tibetan Autonomous Prefecture, Qinghai (ancient Kham), China which was severely damaged on April 14, 2010, in the 2010 Yushu earthquake in which many monks and thousands of laypeople died.
