= Ling Yen Mountain Temple =

Buddhist monastery in British Columbia, Canada

Coordinates: 49.14035°N 123.09108°W

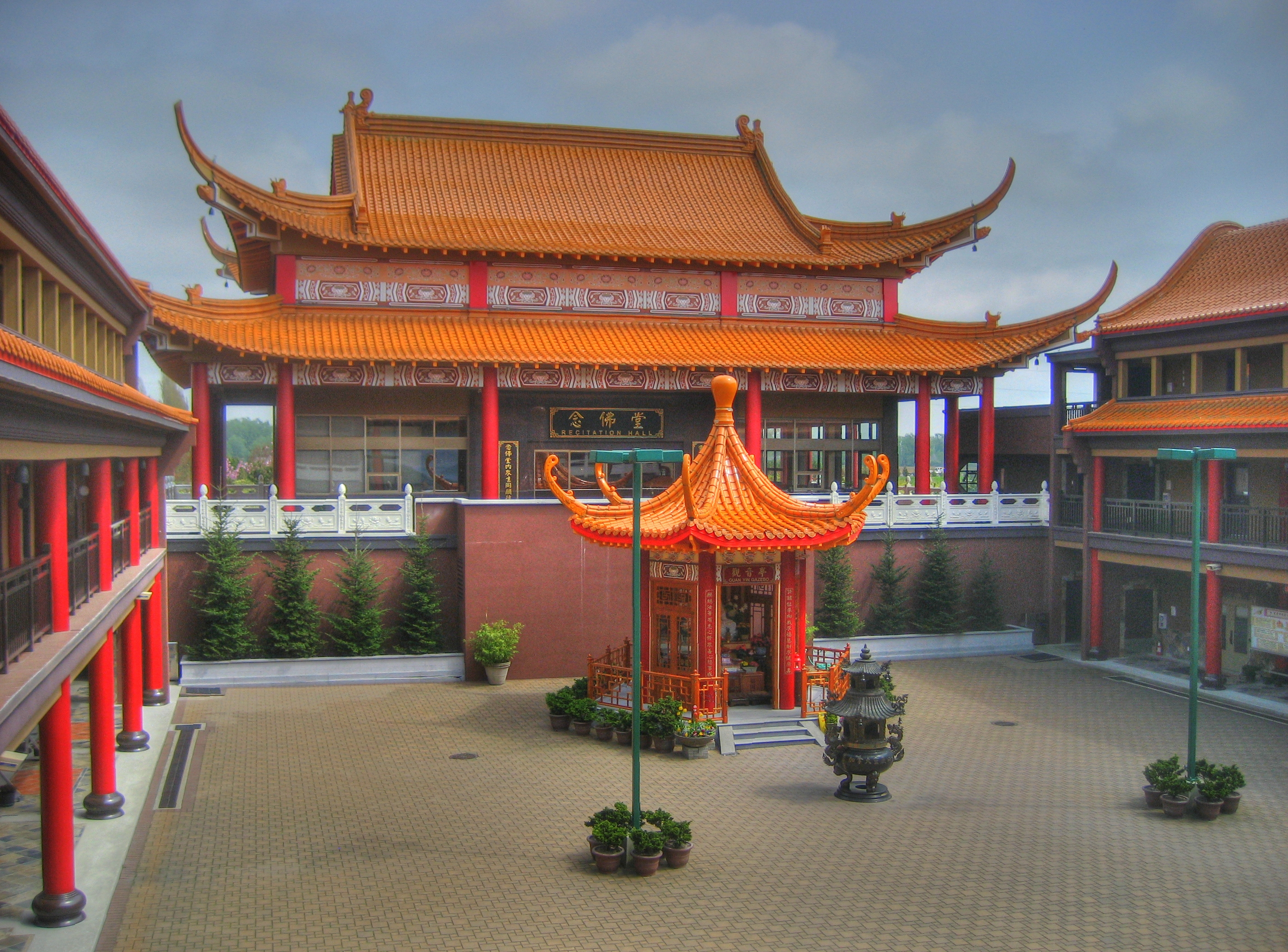
View of the center courtyard of the temple, looking eastward.

The Lingyen Mountain Temple (Chinese: 靈巖山寺; pinyin: líng yán shān sì) in Richmond, British Columbia, Canada is a Buddhist monastery, designed by Pacific Rim Architecture in the Chinese palatial style and completed on September 19, 1999. The temple has about 10,000 members in Greater Vancouver and several dozen resident monastics.

== Tradition ==
The temple is in the Pure Land tradition of Ling Yen Shan near Suzhou, Jiangsu, China. It is an offshoot of Ling Yen Mountain Temple near Puli, Nantou, Taiwan, which was founded by Master Miao Lien in 1984.

== Location ==
Located on No. 5 Road in Richmond near Williams Road, the Lingyen Mountain Temple is located within a 20-minute drive from Vancouver, parts of Richmond and other Metro Vancouver municipalities with a significant Buddhist population. It is a 2-minute walk away from the high school of Richmond Christian School.

The temple is on a stretch of Richmond's No. 5 Road that is home to many regional temples, churches, mosques, and associated schools, which has been dubbed Richmond's "Highway to Heaven". The area is within British Columbia's Agricultural Land Reserve. The temple is one of few religious establishments there to have complied with the city's requirement that a certain portion of the properties be actively farmed. They have established an orchard of apple, fig, and pear trees and berries. There is also an actively farmed field producing crops such as potatoes, corn, and squash.

== Plans for expansion ==
With 10,000 worshippers and over 8,000 community and school group visits over the years, the Temple is proposing an expansion of the temple on its land in addition to the current facilities. The new facilities are to better serve visitors, worshippers and practitioners as an all-encompassing international Buddhist centre. The new facility is envisioned to provide multi-purpose space and comprehensive services to allow the general public to delve deeply into Buddhism.

The new buildings would include more dormitories for the lay practitioners, and a 140-foot (43 m) high hall to house a dining hall, prayer space and a gilded Buddha statue. The statue in the current hall is 15 feet (4.6 m) tall. The new proposed main temple would require a variance to height restrictions currently in place on Assembly Use and Agriculturally designated land.

Though never completed, in 2005 an initial development application was submitted to the City of Richmond. There has been opposition from area residents, primarily due to concerns about height of the main temple and increased traffic from visitors. On 2005-09-06, at the temple's request, the city deferred a special public hearing of their land use application, to allow them to address all public concerns in their planning for the proposed expansion. The neighbouring Richmond Bethel Mennonite Church, which has both English and Chinese congregations, and four ideally situated acres, had rejected the temple's proposal to purchase their property and relocate them.

In 2010 new expansion plans where submitted to the City of Richmond the revised plan was 76% larger than the plan in 2005. Richmond residents opposed the plans and submitted to the City Binders in support of their opposition which included exhibits and a brief to explain their opposition, the primary reason was the residents felt the 99,000 sq ft, 145 ' tall main temple and 98' tall twin monks dormitories where just too big for the single family neighborhood. A group was formed by the neighbors called C.A.L.E. Committee Against Lingyen Expansion their purpose was to organize an opposition to the plan and convince the City of Richmond to deny the application. C.A.L.E. also requested meetings with the temple directors to ask for a meeting to work out a compromise for a smaller expansion that would be in harmony with the neighborhood.

As of December 2010 the expansion plans have been withdrawn so that the City of Richmond can review the No. 5 Road back lands policy and better understand the needs of the community and the tolerances of the neighborhood. The review is slated to be completed in spring 2012 after consultation with all stakeholders.

In 2014, a new expansion proposal was presented to the City of Richmond. The proposal was referred back to staff, so that the City Planners and Council could further consider the proposed building height, agricultural compensation, traffic impacts, and clarifications to the proposed dormitory use. The owners of the temple then hired a new architect, DA Architects + Planners, to revise the proposal.

The most recent iteration of the expansion plans were presented to the City of Richmond in 2016, and were given second and third readings by Richmond City Council at a Public Hearing on June 20, 2016. The approved proposal includes a significantly smaller Main Buddha Hall, at a maximum height of 25.9 metres (85 feet). This represents a decrease of 53% from the first proposed expansion. The expected size of the monastery has also been reduced, from an expected 147 resident nuns to 60.

The new temple buildings will be the tallest religious buildings in the area, and are expected to be built to LEED Gold standards. It is already getting expanded now.

== Celebrations ==
The temple has regular celebrations of events during different seasons. During the celebration of Buddha's birthday and Chinese New Year, the building is surrounded with 1000 special lanterns. Paramita Ball prayers are also set out on occasion.

== Notes ==
https://www.udcdesigns.ca/ling-yen-mountain-temple-richmond-bc/
