= Birken Forest Buddhist Monastery =

Theravada Buddhist monastery near Kamloops, British Columbia, Canada

Coordinates: 50°25′54.11″N 120°11′6.43″W

Religion
- Affiliation: Theravada, Thai Forest Tradition

Location
- Location: 7000 Smith Lake Forest Srv Rd. Knutsford, BC; V0E 2A0
- Country: Canada
- Interactive map of Birken Forest Buddhist Monastery

Architecture
- Founder: Bhikkhu (Ajahn) Sona
- Completed: 1994

Website
- https://birken.ca/

Birken Forest Buddhist Monastery, or Sītavana (Pali: "Cool Forest"), is a Theravada Buddhist monastery in the Thai Forest Tradition near Kamloops, British Columbia. It serves as a training centre for monastics and also a retreat facility for laypeople. Its abbot is Venerable Ajahn Soṇa.

== History ==
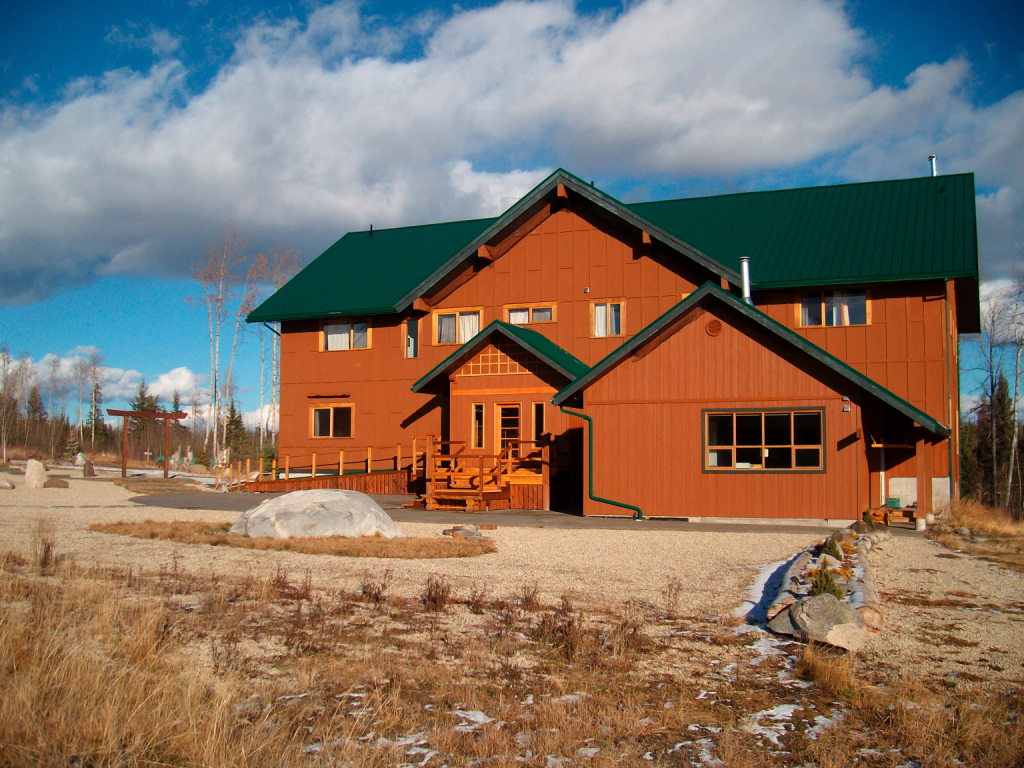
Main building (vihara) at Birken Forest Buddhist Monastery, near Kamloops, BC.

Birken Forest Buddhist Monastery has been developed in three distinct phases:

In phase 1, Bhikkhu Soṇa and Bhikkhu Piyadhammo established Birken in a sparse two-room shack in the mountains near Pemberton, BC, along the Birkenhead River in 1994. This was the first monastery of the Thai Forest Tradition in Canada.

During phase 2, the monastery moved to a new location, northeast of Princeton, BC (referred to by scholars as "Birken II"). Facilities were expanded and included running water, electricity, and carpeting, as well as a refrigerator, sink and furnace. It was a significant improvement, but still quite austere.

For phase 3, the monastery moved in 2001 to a property south of Kamloops ("Birken III"). The resident community then finished work on the main building, and has since been continually enhancing it in addition to adding cabins and improving road access. "Sītavana" was added as an alternate Pali name for Birken in 2007.

On November 29, 2003, Birken hosted the historically significant upasampada ceremony, or bhikkhu ordination, of Ven. Nanda and Ven. Pavaro. This was the first such ordination held at Birken, and the first ordination of Canadian-born bhikkhus, by Canadian bhikkhus, in Canada. Ajahn Pasanno, co-abbot of Abhayagiri monastery, served as their upajjhaya (preceptor) and Ajahn Soṇa as their ācariya (teacher).

== Abbot ==
Ajahn Soṇa is the monastery's founder and abbot. Born in Canada in 1954 (as Tom West), Ajahn Soṇa's background as a layperson is in classical guitar performance. His encounter with Buddhist wisdom as a young man initiated a spiritual journey that led him to become a lay hermit in the Coast Mountain region of BC for several years. He subsequently ordained as a Theravada monk in 1989 under Ven. Gunaratana, at the Bhavana Society in West Virginia, where his first years of training took place. Ven. Soṇa further trained for over three years at monasteries following Ajahn Chah in northeast Thailand, especially Wat Pah Nanachat. Upon his return to Canada in 1994 he helped found the original Birken Forest Monastery near Pemberton, BC and, as its spiritual guide, he has since led the monastery through each stage of its growth.

== Culture ==
Birken monks follow the Thai Forest Tradition, which is strictly disciplined and prohibits touching money. Thus, they rely on the people around them for food and other resources. Birken also depends heavily on resident lay stewards, who volunteer their services and live at the monastery full-time. Although the stewards are not monks themselves, they are asked to abide by the eight precepts of Buddhism for the duration of their stay. Stewards stay at the monastery for at least three months, and are the primary caretakers for the monks, who are not permitted to ask for help. In Birken's early days, it relied heavily on donations from locals. Since then, it has become more well known, and many Canadians give freely to help support the Thai Forest Tradition in North America.

== Location ==
The monastery is currently located on an 80-acre (320,000 m^{2}) property, surrounded by forest, at an elevation of 4,000 feet (1,200 m). About 40 km south of Kamloops by road, the property is shared with moose, deer, the occasional black bear, range cattle, geese and owls. Guests can take a 5–6 km walk around Smith Lake and the marshland on which the monastery is situated.

== Facilities ==
The Birken guesthouse provides nearly 10,000 square feet (930 m^{2}). of living space, including a spectacular meditation hall overlooking the surrounding forest and bird sanctuary. This main building has a walking meditation hall as well as a library and eating area in the basement, a large kitchen, guest rooms, and 4 shared bathrooms.

Monastics live in individual kutis (small cabins). During some periods, a kuti may be available for guest use. These have propane heaters, but no electricity, water, or toilet facilities; and are a 2- to 10-minute walk from the main building. Depending on demand, guest rooms in the main building may be private or shared. Men's and women's quarters are separate.

Due to its great distance from even a rural city, the monastery has unique arrangements for its utilities. Birken is entirely off-the-grid, with 16 solar panels supplying enough power for most of the year; on cloudy days, especially during the winter months, a backup diesel generator is activated as necessary. The Internet is accessed using a satellite connection, which also supports the monastery's VOIP phone. Water is pumped from a well. Birken also has a post office box.

== Services ==
=== Retreats ===
All of the services provided by the monastery are offered freely, without suggested fee. Birken, like many monasteries of this tradition, is supported entirely by voluntary donations.

Many scheduled retreats are held at the monastery annually. These include "Absolute Beginner" weekend retreats; "Introductory" retreats for those with some meditation experience; and 5-, 8-, 9-, and 10-day silent retreats for more advanced meditators.

For most of the year, Birken is open for guests to come for periods ranging from overnight to a few days. Day-visits to Birken are also possible (except during scheduled retreats). There are daily opportunities to speak individually with the abbot or one of the monks.

Each year Birken has a three-month Winter Retreat - during this time (roughly January through March), limited reservations are taken as the resident community dedicates itself to silent practice. For the remaining nine months of the year, Birken welcomes guests.

=== Online Monastery ===
Ajahn Sona no longer travels for teaching engagements, but instead offers extensive online Dhamma teachings on his YouTube Channel (https://www.youtube.com/AjahnSona).

== See also ==
- Buddhism in Canada
- Thai Forest Tradition
- Forest Tradition of Ajahn Chah
- Ajahn Chah
- Ajahn Amaro
- Ajahn Pasanno
- Bhante Henepola Gunaratana
- Wat Pah Pong, Thailand
- Wat Pah Nanachat, Thailand
- Amaravati Buddhist Monastery, UK
- Chithurst Buddhist Monastery, UK
- Aruna Ratanagiri, UK
- Santacittarama, Italy
- Abhayagiri Buddhist Monastery, USA
- Bodhinyana Monastery, Australia
- Kamloops, BC
