= Kay Larson =

American art critic

Kay Larson is an American art critic, columnist, author, and Buddhist practitioner. She wrote a column of art criticism for New York magazine for 14 years. Her writing about art and Buddhism has appeared in numerous publications, including The New York Times, ARTnews, The Village Voice, Vogue, Artforum, Tricycle, and Buddhadharma, among others.

In 2012, she published her first book, Where the Heart Beats: John Cage, Zen Buddhism, and the Inner Life of Artists (Penguin Press).

== Early life and career ==
Larson graduated from Pomona College in 1969 with a degree in philosophy and visual art. During her last year of school, she worked as a reporter for the San Diego Sentinel, a community newspaper.

In 1970, she went on to Cambridge, Massachusetts, where she worked as a research associate at the Center for Advanced Visual Studies, and at Hayden gallery, at MIT.

In 1972, Larson began her career as a journalist at The Real Paper, where she wrote a weekly art column and feature stories. She was the associate editor for ARTnews from 1975 to 1978, and the art critic for a weekly art column in The Village Voice in 1979. In 1980, she started her job at New York magazine, where she worked as art critic and contributing editor until 1994.

== Where the Heart Beats: John Cage, Zen Buddhism, and the Inner Life of Artists ==
Larson drew from her knowledge of both the art world and Buddhism in her first book, Where the Heart Beats: John Cage, Zen Buddhism, and the Inner Life of Artists. The book is an "unconventional biography" of John Cage: composer, Buddhist, and arts innovator; and specifically, his awakening through Zen Buddhism and the central role it played in his life and work. Though there have been other biographies written about Cage, what makes “Where the Heart Beats” different is that Larson focuses on the interior process behind his work, excerpting from his writings, interviews, and recorded talks.

As Ben Rattliff observed in The New York Times, “The lessons he absorbed — particularly one on the ego and the outside world, reconstructed and well narrated by Ms. Larson — solidified notions he’d already been swimming toward through his early studies in harmony with Arnold Schoenberg; his interest in the ideas of noise and anti-art taken from Futurism and Dada; and his readings of Christian and Hindu mystics. What he learned from Suzuki forms this book’s core, and even its structure.”

Larson traces Cage's spiritual journey; from his early life in California to his introduction to Zen in D. T. Suzuki’s class at Columbia University in 1950, to the emergence of Zen teachings in Cage's compositions, such as the Buddhist notion of Śūnyatā (what Suzuki called "Zero" or "The Absolute Void"). Cage wanted to capture this notion in his music, and began experimenting with chance operations, derived from the ancient Chinese I Ching (Book of Changes), to make decisions in his compositions, resulting in his most famous piece, the 1952 silent composition 4′33".

Larson identifies the noted artists, musicians, and performers inspired by Cage's awakening, such as Jasper Johns, Yoko Ono, Robert Rauschenberg, Nam June Paik, and, most significantly, dance-choreographer Merce Cunningham, whom Cage had a decades long relationship with. Larson credits Cage with shaping the avant-garde movement that was forming in the 1950s, and for providing a route out of abstract expressionism.

The book was on NPR's "Favorite Music Books Of 2012", named "Best Buddhist Book of the Year" by Buddhadharma, one of Los Angeles Magazine's "Top Ten Music Books of the Year", and a Brain Pickings "Best Book of the Year".

== Later career ==
Larson was a frequent contributor to The New York Times, as a non-staff writer, from 1995 to 2008.

From 1991 to 1997, she was an adjunct instructor in the Department of Fine Arts at New York University, where she held a seminar on the sources of post-modern art of the 1960s, as well as a survey of twentieth-century art.

From 2003 to 2010, she was a writing tutor at the Center of Curatorial Studies (an exhibition and research center offering a Master’s Degree in curatorship) at Bard College in Annandale-on-Hudson, New York.

From 2003 to 2015, she was the managing editor at Curator: The Museum Journal, a quarterly scholarly journal of the international museum community.

== Buddhism ==
In 1994, Larson entered Zen practice at Zen Mountain Monastery in the Catskill Mountains, where her teacher was John Daido Loori, an American Rōshi. After practicing intensive Zen for 10 years, she currently practices in the Karma Kagyu tradition of Tibetan Buddhism.

From 2000 to 2005, Larson was a contributor the national research consortium, "Awake: Art, Buddhism, and the Dimensions of Consciousness". The consortium was organized by Jacquelynn Baas (Director, University of California Berkeley Art Museum), and Mary Jane Jacob (professor, Department of Sculpture, School of the Art Institute of Chicago) to investigate the shared aspects of the meditating, creative, and perceiving mind, and the relationship of Buddhism to contemporary artmaking. The consortium resulted in the book Buddha Mind in Contemporary Art, (2004, University of California Press).
