= Chase Twichell =

American poet

Chase Twichell (born August 20, 1950) is an American poet, professor, publisher, and, in 1999, the founder of Ausable Press. Horses Where the Answers Should Have Been (Copper Canyon Press, 2010) earned her Claremont Graduate University's prestigious $100,000 Kingsley Tufts Poetry Award.

== Life and work ==
Twichell was born in New Haven, Connecticut, and earned her B.A. from Trinity College and her M.F.A. from the Iowa Writers' Workshop. She was married to novelist Russell Banks from 1989 until his death in 2023. She has taught at Princeton University, Warren Wilson College, Goddard College, University of Alabama, and Hampshire College.

Many of Twichell's poems are heavily influenced by her years as a Zen Buddhist student of John Daido Loori at Zen Mountain Monastery, and her poetry in the book The Snow Watcher shows it. She attended the Foote School in New Haven. In the Fall 2003 Tricycle magazine interview with Chase, she says, "Zazen and poetry are both studies of the mind. I find the internal pressure exerted by emotion and by a koan to be similar in surprising and unpredictable ways. Zen is a wonderful sieve through which to pour a poem. It strains out whatever's inessential."

=== Awards and recognition ===
Twichell is the winner of several awards in writing from the New Jersey State Council on the Arts, the American Academy of Arts and Letters and The Artists Foundation. Additionally, she has received fellowships from both the Guggenheim Foundation and the National Endowment for the Arts. Her poems have appeared in literary journals and magazines including The New Yorker, Field, Ploughshares, The Georgia Review, The Paris Review, Poetry, The Nation, and The Yale Review.

Twichell was a judge for the 2011 Griffin Poetry Prize.

== Bibliography ==
=== Poetry ===
Collections

- Twichell, Chase (1981). Northern spy : poems. Pittsburgh: University of Pittsburgh Press.
- — (1986). The odds. Pittsburgh: University of Pittsburgh Press.
- Perdido (Farrar, Straus & Giroux, 1991)
- The Ghost of Eden (Ontario Review Press, 1995)
- The Snow Watcher (Ontario Review Press, 1998)
- Dog Language (Copper Canyon Press, 2005)
- Horses Where the Answers Should Have Been (Copper Canyon Press, 2010)
- Things as It Is (Copper Canyon Press, 2018)

List of poems

Title	Year	First published	Reprinted/collected
Roadkill	2014	Twichell, Chase (January 6, 2014). "Roadkill". The New Yorker. 89 (43): 33.	
Featherweight	2022	Twichell, Chase (May 16, 2022). "Featherweight". The New Yorker. 98 (12): 64–65.	

Anthologies edited

- The Practice of Poetry: Writing Exercises From Poets Who Teach (edited with Robin Behn: HarperPerennial, 1992)

Translations

- The Lover of God, Poems by Rabindranath Tagore (Copper Canyon Press, 2003) (translated with Tony K. Stewart)
