= Geoffrey Shugen Arnold =

American Zen Buddhist

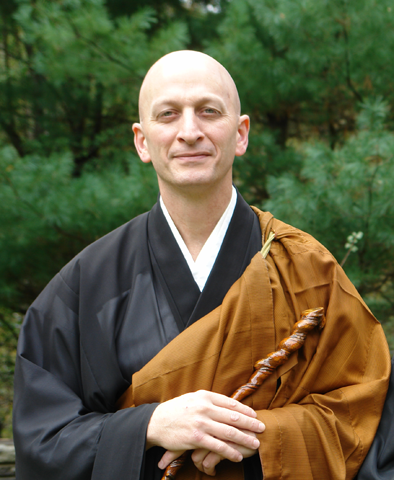
- Title: Rōshi

Personal life
- Born: October 20, 1957 (age 68) Atlanta, Georgia

Religious life
- Religion: Zen Buddhism
- School: Sōtō
- Lineage: Mountains and Rivers Order
- Dharma name: Kodo Shugen

Senior posting
- Teacher: John Daido Loori
- Based in: Zen Center of New York City; Zen Mountain Monastery; National Buddhist Prison Sangha

Military service
- Website: Zen Mountain Monastery

Geoffrey Shugen Arnold is Rōshi of the Mountains and Rivers Order (MRO) founded by John Daido Loori, from whom Shugen received shiho, or dharma transmission, in July 1997. As a lineage holder in the Sōtō tradition, Shugen currently serves as head of MRO and abbot of Zen Mountain Monastery in Mt. Tremper, New York, where he serves as the full-time resident teacher. Trained as a musician, Shugen was introduced to and began practicing Zen meditation in 1975. He began his formal training at Zen Mountain Monastery in 1984, and received tokudo, full monastic ordination, in 1988. Shugen's teachings have appeared in various Buddhist publications, including Buddhadharma: The Practitioner's Quarterly, The Mountain Record and in The Best Buddhist Writing 2005 and 2009. He is the author of O, Beautiful End, a collection of Zen memorial poems, published by Dharma Communications in 2012.

Shugen Roshi has given shiho or dharma transmission to Ron Hogen Green, Sensei; Jody Hojin Kimmel, Sensei; Vanessa Zuisei Goddard, Sensei; and Danica Shoan Ankele, Sensei.

== See also ==
- Buddhism in the United States
- Timeline of Zen Buddhism in the United States
