= Konrad Ryushin Marchaj =

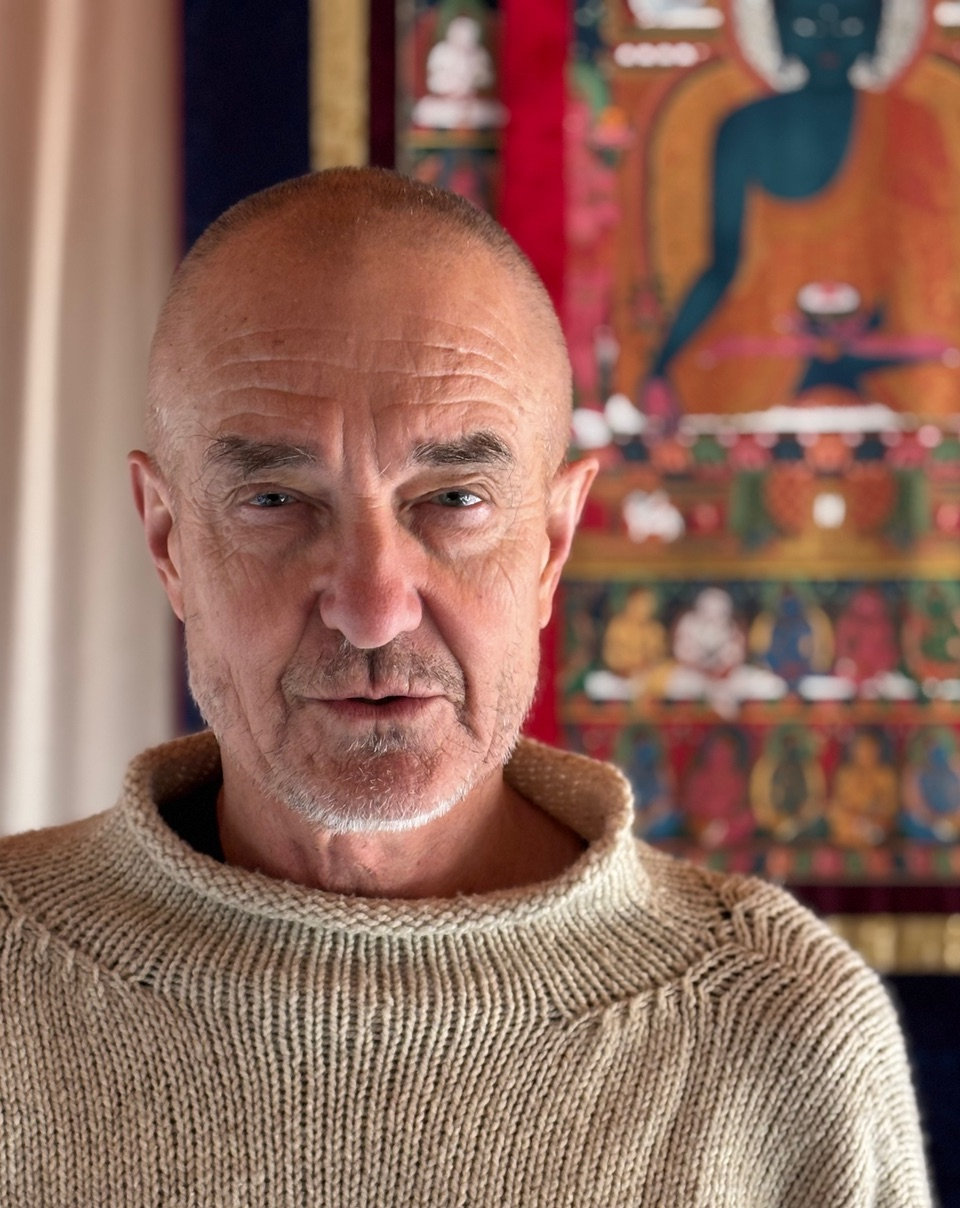
- Title: Sensei

Personal life
- Born: June 1, 1953 (age 73) Warsaw, Poland
- Education: Medical degree
- Occupation: Zen priest

Religious life
- Religion: Zen Buddhism
- School: Sōtō
- Lineage: Mountains and Rivers Order
- Dharma name: Fusan Ryushin

Senior posting
- Teacher: John Daido Loori

Konrad Ryushin Marchaj is an independent Zen teacher in the Sōtō School of Zen Buddhism. From October 2009 to January 2015 he was the abbot of Zen Mountain Monastery, the main house of the Mountains and Rivers Order (MRO) of Zen Buddhism, founded by John Daido Loori, Roshi, from whom Ryushin received shiho - dharma transmission and authorization to teach - in June 2009. Ryushin entered into full-time residence at the Monastery in 1992 and became abbot there following Daido Roshi's death in 2009. In addition to his roles as the Monastery’s abbot and director of operations, he explored contemplative practices in higher education, collaborating with several liberal arts educators and administrators in the Northeast to look at ways for college students to engage religious practice as part of their education. Ryushin stepped down as abbot in 2015 after it was disclosed that he had been having an extramarital affair and exploring shamanic traditions.

Ryushin came to the dharma through Vipassana meditation, eventually shifting to Zen practice and taking Daido Roshi as his teacher. Before his ordination, Ryushin worked as a pediatrician and psychiatrist. Ryushin guides lay students in seamlessly integrating their ordinary lives with all-encompassing, illuminating, and enlivening spiritual practice. He also explores the interface between rigorous Zen training and the ceremonial use of sacred plants, collaborating with Brazilian teachers in the United States and Brazil.

Ryushin has been practicing Buddhism since 1983. Drawing on his background as a physician and psychiatrist, Ryushin focuses on training “in the workings of the mind,” combined with his skill at translating complex concepts into accessible, everyday language, which characterizes his unique teaching style.

Born in Warsaw, Poland, he immigrated to the United States in 1967. He received a Bachelor of Arts degree in Anthropology from Yale University in 1976, and his medical degree from Albany Medical College in 1980. He worked first as a pediatrician in Portland, Maine, later serving in the US Navy as a physician for three years. He then returned to Albany for postgraduate training in psychiatry. After completing his residency, he served as medical director for a community psychiatric outreach program, the Mobile Crisis Team, which served Albany County’s disenfranchised and homeless population.

== Author ==
- 2014: "OK, Here’s the Deal", Lion’s Roar: Buddhist Wisdom for Our Time (online publication)
- 2006: Mountain Record - The Zen Practictoner's Journal 25th Anniversary Issue (publication)
- 1999 - 2003: Mountain Record - The Zen Practitioner's Journal (publication)

== Editor ==
- 2002: The Eight Gates of Zen: A Program of Zen training ( Shambhala, 1999).’ by John Daido Loori
- 2001: Cave of Tigers: The Living Zen Practice of Dharma Combat (Hanging Loose Press, 2001), by John Daido Loori
- 1999: Riding the Ox Home, (Shambhala, 1999), by John Daido Loori

== Lectures ==
- 2012: “Resting in the Moment: Tung shan's Cold and Heat”, published by Dharma Communications
- 2012: “Riding the Edge of Impermanence: Ta Sui’s It goes along with it”, published by Dharma Communications
- 2012: “Coming to Life: Chao Chou's Big Turnips”, published by Dharma Communications
- 2012: “The Teacher's Vow: Ching Ch'ing's Person in the Weeds”, published by Dharma Communications
- 2012: “Change Your Mind: Yang Shan Asks Where Have You Come From?”, published by Dharma Communications
- 2012: “Embrace Harmony: Elder ting stands motionless”, published by Dharma Communications
- 2012: “How To Be a Student”, published by Dharma Communications
- 2012: “The Work of a Lifetime: National Teacher Chung's Seamless Monument”, published by Dharma Communications
- 2012: “Losing My Religion: Hu Ch'ao Asks about Buddha”, published by Dharma Communications
- 2012: “Meet the Challenge: Pao Fu's Summit of the Mystic Peak”, published by Dharma Communications
- 2011: “Why Do the Things You Do?: Bell-Sound and Priest's Robe”, published by Dharma Communications
- 2011: “Life Is But A Dream: Talk by the monk of the Third Seat”, published by Dharma Communications
- 2011: “Enjoy the Journey: A Buffalo Passes Through a Window”, published by Dharma Communications
- 2011: “Shake Up Delusion: Neither the Wind Nor the Flag”, published by Dharma Communications
