= The Nature Park & Galleries, Hebrew University of Jerusalem =

Open-air campus museum

Coordinates: 31.7759°N 35.1968°E

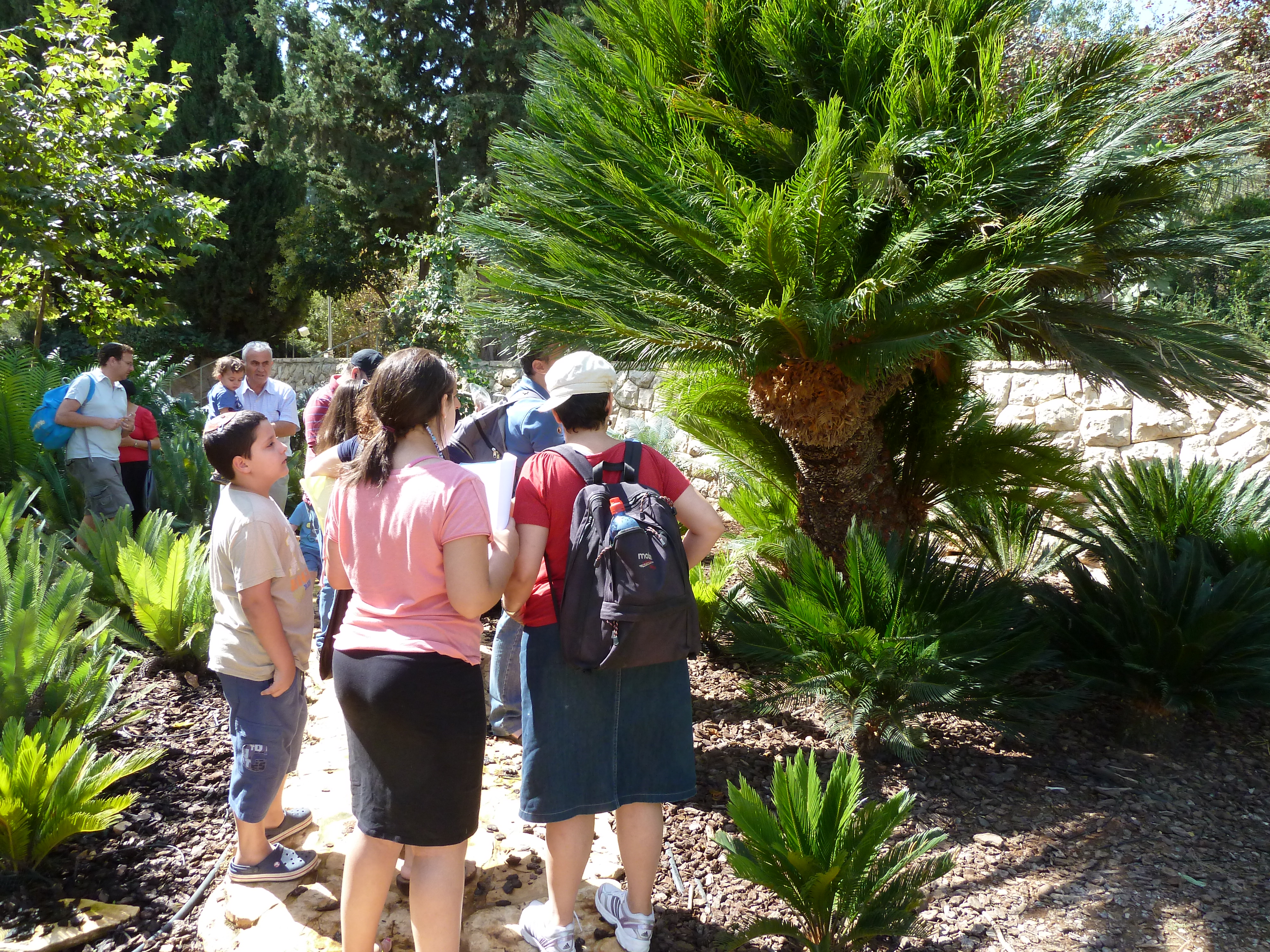
Visitors exploring the Plant Evolution Garden at NPG.

The Nature Park & Galleries (NPG; Hebrew: שדרות טבע וגלריות), is a unique open-air nature museum, located on the Hebrew University of Jerusalem's Edmund J. Safra Science Campus in Jerusalem, Israel.

== Overview ==
The Nature Park & Galleries was conceived and founded in 2003 by Prof. Jeff Camhi (Kimchi), who remains its director, accompanied by Dr. Talia Levy, its manager. The museum functions as a unit of the Hebrew University’s Authority for Community and Youth, but carries out its own planning and fund-raising. The museum offers people of all ages a wide range of experiences relating to Israeli natural history, science, and research.

The museum, which extends from the campus’ main entrance to its far end, is dotted with interactive explanatory signs as well as fully developed exhibits. Almost all the exhibits are wheelchair-accessible. The museum can be visited for free any day of the week.

A flip-up cabinet just inside the main campus entrance offers visitors a printed guide to the museum. Entitled Campus Strolls in English, or "בשבילי הקמפוס" in Hebrew, the guide also points up other special campus highlights.

== Exhibits ==
The Nature Park and Galleries outdoors museum of nature and science presents six permanent exhibits:

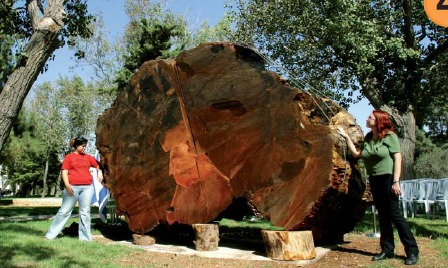
- A slice from the trunk of a giant sequoia, featured on the Discovery Tree Walk.
  The Discovery Tree Walk: Fifty trees from habitats all around the world make this campus a botanical treasure. Each of these fifty trees is highlighted by an interactive sign that points out the tree’s botanical, geographical, historic, and folkloric features. One sign, for instance features a slice from the huge trunk of a 2000 year old giant sequoia tree from California. It stands beside Israel’s oldest living Sequoia tree.
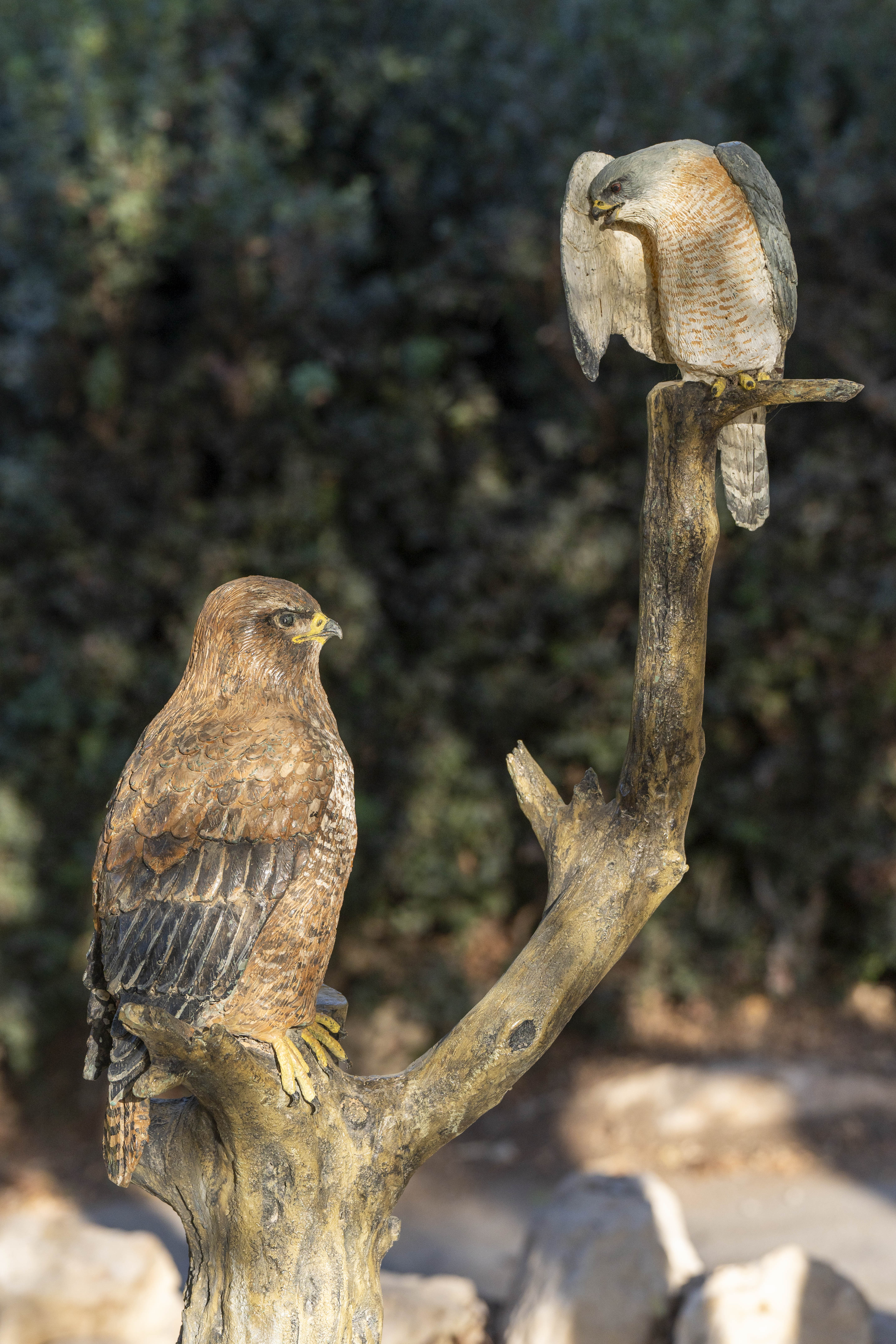
  Sculptures of a Levantine sparrowhawk (top) and a steppe buzzard (bottom), two migratory birds that pass through Israel, featured on the Bird Migration Walk.
- Bird Migration Trail: Fifty birds, sculpted in bronze, painted true to life, and permanently installed among the campus gardens, are the work of Israeli artist and bird fancier Roi Shinar. The fifty are divided into four separate displays, according to the season of their annual appearance on campus. The four are:
  - Autumn arrivals from Europe and Asia
  - Spring arrivals from Africa
  - Autumn and spring stop-over birds in transit between Eurasia and Africa
  - Permanent resident birds.

Signage gives each bird’s English, Hebrew and scientific name.

- Plant Evolution Garden: In this lovely garden, one walks through 500 million years of plant history. Signs explain the major turning points in plant evolution and direct the visitor's view toward features of the living plants that illustrate these turning points. Among the turning points featured are vegetation's initial movement from water to land, the later development of roots, leaves, and vertical growth, the first seed plants, early conifers and early flowering plants, and adaptations to moist, and to arid environments by modern plants.
- Bridging the Sciences: This indoor exhibit presents various scientific disciplines and explores how scientists who work together across disciplinary boundaries can sometimes arrive at major scientific achievements. The Hebrew University’s science faculty is featured.
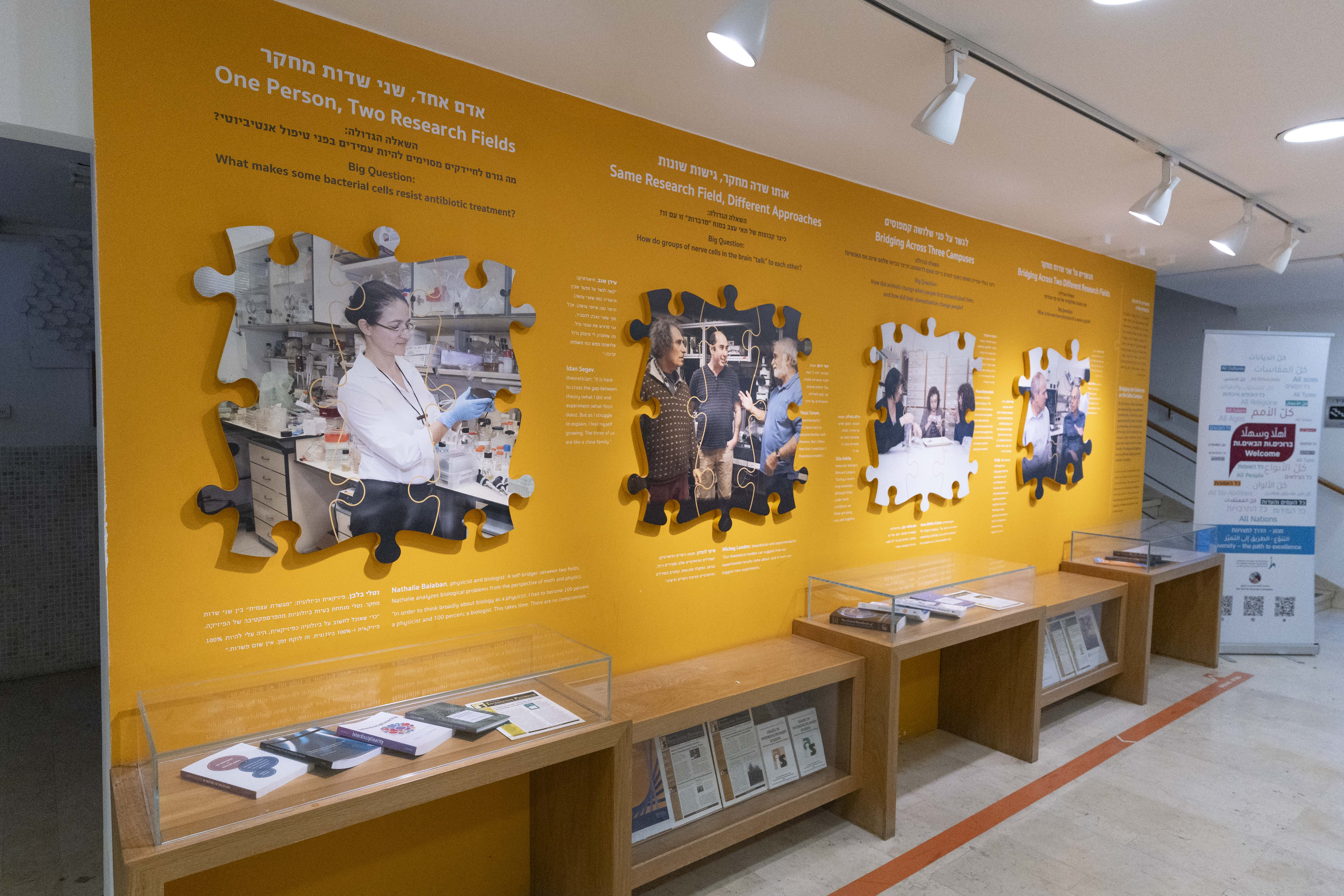
  View of a section of the 'Bridging the Sciences' exhibit.
- Order-in-Nature Boardwalk: This specially built walkway takes you through a varied grove where you can enjoy a rich variety of wild plants, and learn from the signage how nature, though seemingly disorderly, in fact has its own order. Or you can just sit and enjoy the peace and quiet.
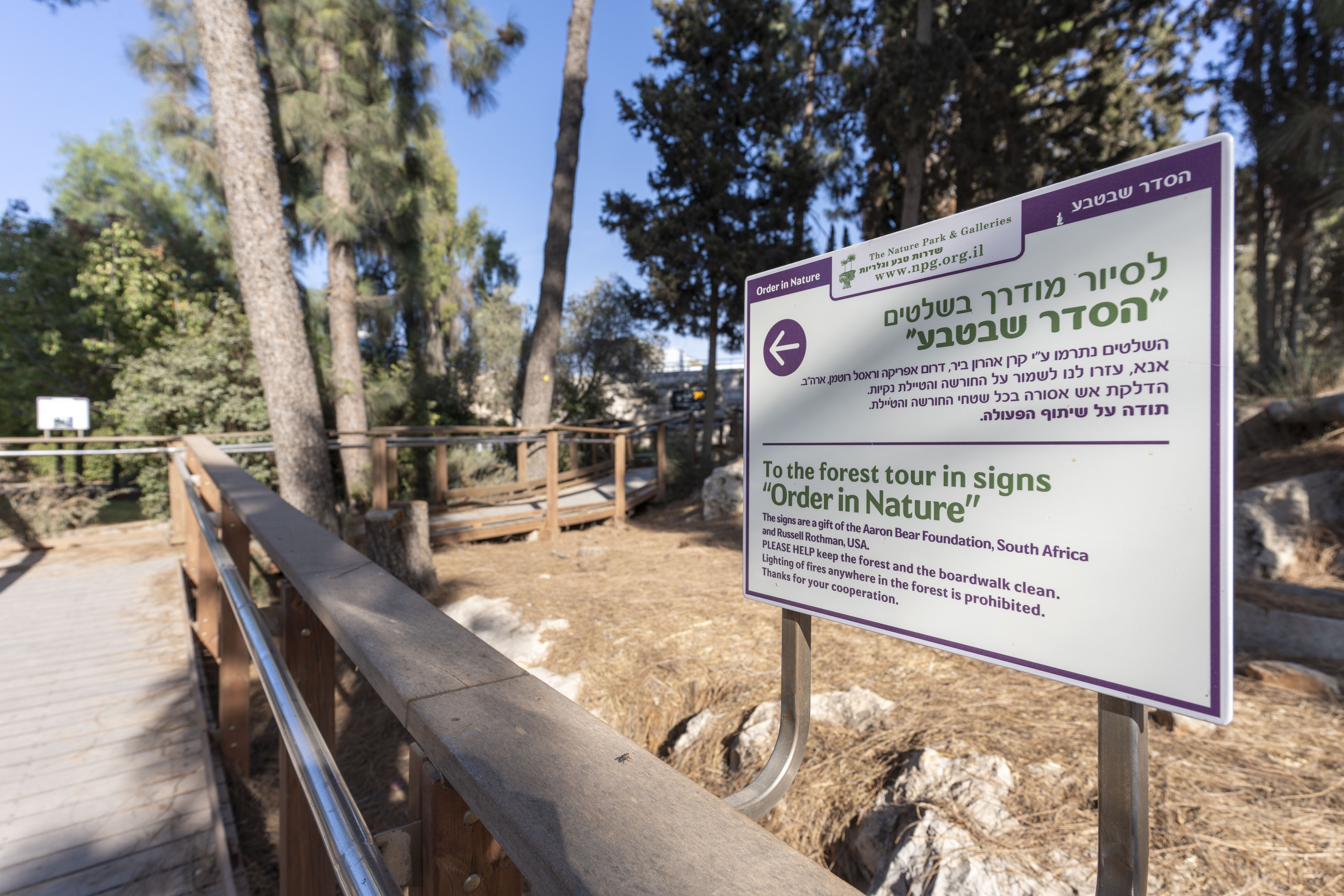
  Sign at entrance to Order-in-Nature Boardwalk, inviting visitors to a self-guided tour.
- Wildflower Boardwalk: This promenade courses through a spectacular bloom of many wildflower species, especially in spring. The signage offers explanations, riddles, and thought-provoking questions in natural science. Note: In recent years, the plants of this area have received fire-prevention treatment in late spring which has reduced somewhat the number and diversity of blooming plants in that season.

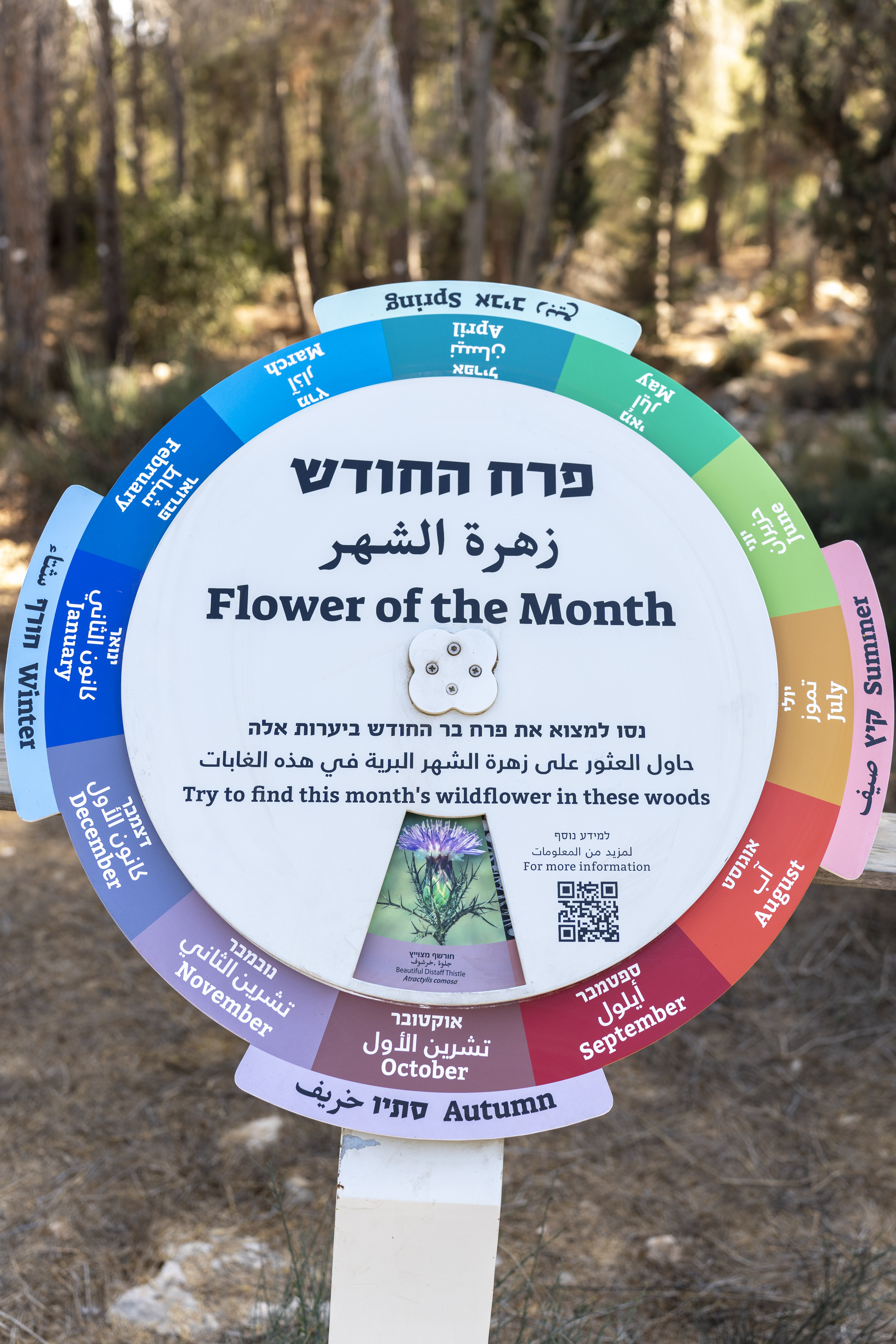
Flower-of-the-month interactive wheel, as found on the Wildflower Boardwalk.

== Publications ==
NPG publishes books interpreting the treasures of the Safra Campus:

- Michael Avishai and Jeff Camhi, Fifty Tree Tales: Edmond J. Safra Campus, Givat Ram Tree Guide (Jerusalem: Nature Park & Galleries, 2007). Available at the Michlol (מכלול) bookstore, Edmond J. Safra campus.
- Jeff Camhi: A Dam in the River: Releasing the Flow of University Ideas. (Algora Publishing, 2013).

Sample of Research Articles:

- Jeff Camhi, “Pathways for communicating about objects on guided tours.” Curator: The Museum Journal 51(3): 2008, 277–296.
- Dina Tsybulskaya and Jeff Camhi, “Accessing and incorporating visitors’ entrance narratives in guided museum tours.” Curator: The Museum Journal 52(1): 2009, 81–100.
- Jeff Camhi, Dina Tsybulskaya and Jeff Dodick, "An ‘open campus museum’ for sharing science with the public.” International Journal of Science in Society 4(4): 2013, 101–108.
