= Bonnie Myotai Treace =

- Bonnie Myotai Treace Sensei of Black Mountain Zen, Black Mountain, NC
- Title: Sensei

Personal life
- Born: 1956 (age 69–70)

Religious life
- Religion: Zen Buddhism
- Lineage: Soto Zen
- Dharma name: Tasshu Myotai

Senior posting
- Teacher: Maezumi Roshi, Daido Roshi
- Based in: Hermitage Heart
- Predecessor: John Daido Loori
- Successor: Phil Sengetsu Kolman

Bonnie Myotai Treace is a Zen teacher and priest, the founder of Hermitage Heart, and formerly the abbot of the Zen Center of New York City (ZCNYC). She teaches currently in Black Mountain and Asheville, North Carolina. A lineage holder in the Soto tradition, Myotai Sensei is the first Dharma successor of John Daido Loori, Roshi, in the Mountains and Rivers Order (MRO), having received shiho, dharma transmission, from him in 1996. Serving and training for over two decades in the MRO, she was the establishing teacher and first abbess of the ZCNYC. At the Monastery she was the Vice Abbot, the first director of Dharma Communications, editor of Mountain Record, and coordinator of the affiliates of the MRO. Treace, ordained as a Zen monastic, now lives as a lay teacher, working primarily with her long-term students.

Treace holds an advanced degree in literature and was a lobbyist for women's issues and an analyst with the Potomac Research Institute specializing in hydromechanics.

In 2016 Myotai gave shiho to Phil Sengetsu Kolman, Sensei, and named John Kyoman Weiczorek as Dharma Steward of Hermitage Heart.

Treace is the author of five books: A Year of Zen, Wake Up, Zen Meditation for Beginners, Winter Moon: A Season of Zen, and Empty Branches. She has also had chapters in Water: Its Spiritual Significance (Vons Fitae Press), The Art of Just Sitting: Essential Writings on the Zen Practice of Shikantaza, and Lotus Moon: The Poetry of Rengetsu, along with many other writings. Myotai's teachings have appeared in various Buddhist publications, including Buddhadharma: The Practitioner's Quarterly, Mountain Record and in several editions of The Best Buddhist Writing.

== See also ==
- John Daido Loori
- Timeline of Zen Buddhism in the United States

== Notes ==
incomplete references
