= Mountain Record =

Quarterly magazine

Mountain Record: The Zen Practitioner's Journal
- President: Abbot Geoffrey Shugen Arnold, MRO
- Editor: Suzanne Taikyo Gilman, MRO
- Categories: Buddhism, religion, arts, sciences, ethics, social action, business, ecology
- Frequency: Quarterly
- Circulation: unknown
- Publisher: Dharma Communications
- Founded: 1980
- Country: United States
- Language: American English
- ISSN: 0896-8942

Mountain Record: The Zen Practitioners' Journal a quarterly journal is a record of the sayings and doings of the Mountains and Rivers Order, its main house Zen Mountain Monastery in Mount Tremper, New York, and its affiliated temples and sitting groups. It is published quarterly by Dharma Communications the educational outreach arm of Zen Mountain Monastery.

Published since 1980, Mountain Record features over 120 pages of articles examining the heart of Zen training, as well as the challenges encountered in meditation practice and the actualization of wisdom in the world.

== Quotes ==
Mountain Record is a perfect antidote for anyone who fears that Buddhist practice is being diluted by its current popularity in American culture. It is a voice of authenticity that reminds us of what genuine spiritual practice has always been and will continue to be long after it ceases to be fashionable.

—Lawrence Shainberg, author of Ambivalent Zen
