= John Daido Loori =

American Buddhist writer (1931–2009)

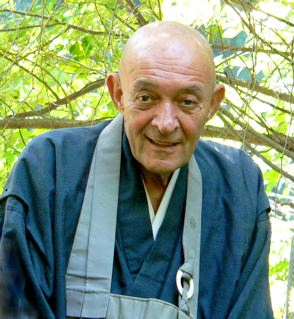
- Title: Rōshi, abbot

Personal life
- Born: June 14, 1931 Jersey City, New Jersey, U.S.
- Died: October 9, 2009 (aged 78) Mount Tremper, New York, U.S.
- Website: zmm.mro.org Zen Mountain Monastery

Religious life
- Religion: Zen Buddhism
- School: Rinzai and Sōtō
- Lineage: Mountains and Rivers Order (part of White Plum Asanga)
- Dharma name: Muge Daido

Senior posting
- Teacher: Taizan Maezumi
- Successor: Bonnie Myotai Treace, Geoffrey Shugen Arnold, Konrad Ryushin Marchaj

John Daido Loori (June 14, 1931 – October 9, 2009) was a Zen Buddhist rōshi who served as the abbot of Zen Mountain Monastery and was the founder of the Mountains and Rivers Order and CEO of Dharma Communications. Daido Loori received shiho (dharma transmission) from Taizan Maezumi in 1986 and also received a Dendo Kyoshi certificate formally from the Soto school of Japan in 1994. In 1997, he received dharma transmission in the Harada-Yasutani and Inzan lineages of Rinzai Zen as well. In 1996 he gave dharma transmission to his student Bonnie Myotai Treace, in 1997 to Geoffrey Shugen Arnold, and in 2009 to Konrad Ryushin Marchaj. In addition to his role as a Zen Buddhist priest, Loori was an exhibited photographer and author of more than twenty books and was an avid naturalist.

In October 2009, he stepped down as abbot citing health issues. Days later, Zen Mountain Monastery announced that his death was imminent. On October 9, 2009, at 7:30 AM he died of lung cancer in Mount Tremper, New York.

== Biography ==
John Daido Loori was born in Jersey City, New Jersey and raised Roman Catholic. As a child Loori loved photographing things, once using his family's bathroom as a makeshift dark room. He served in the U.S. Navy from 1947 to 1952. Later, after studying at Rutgers, he worked as a chemist in the food industry and led the American Civil Liberties Union in Orange and Sullivan Counties in New York. As an adult he distanced himself from Catholicism and explored a variety of other religions. Then, in 1971, he attended a workshop given by the photographer Minor White. Loori came to study photography under White until his death and also learned meditation from him. In 1972 Daido Loori began his formal Zen practice, studying in New York under Soen Nakagawa and then in California under Taizan Maezumi, Roshi.

In 1980 Loori purchased 230 acres (0.93 km^{2}) in New York which today serves as the site for Zen Mountain Monastery. In 1983 he was made a Zen priest by Maezumi and in 1986 was given shiho (or, dharma transmission) by him. In 1997, he received dharma transmission in the Harada-Yasutani and Inzan lineages of Rinzai Zen as well. According to author Richard Hughes, this made Loori "one of three Western dharma-holders in both the Soto and Rinzai schools." Loori was a professional nature photographer, having once exhibited his work at the American Museum of Natural History in Manhattan, New York. He has also held various other shows and workshops on photography, including positions at Naropa University starting in 1974 and the Synechia Arts Center located in Middletown, New York; his works have been published by Aperture and Time-Life. His book, Hearing with the Eye: Photographs from Point Lobos, features Loori's abstract nature photography interwoven with commentary on Teachings of the Insentient by Eihei Dogen.

Loori founded Dharma Communications as a way to communicate the dharma of the Mountains and Rivers Order. Dharma Communications publishes a Buddhist quarterly titled the Mountain Record, various audio-visual materials, and has also published several books by Daido Loori. According to Charles S. Prebish, Dharma Communications is "one of the most efficient and successful publishers of Buddhist materials on the continent, and a place where practitioners can learn how to cultivate both mindfulness and compassion in front of a computer."

== Books ==
- The Way of Mountains and Rivers
- The Zen Art Box with Stephen Addiss
- Hearing with the Eye: Teachings of the Insentient
- The Zen of Creativity : Cultivating Your Artistic Life
- The Eight Gates of Zen : A Program of Zen Training
- Sitting with Koans : Essential Writings on the Zen Practice of Koan Study with Tom Kirshner.
- The True Dharma Eye : Zen Master Dogen's Three Hundred Koans with Kazuaki Tanahashi (Translator).
- The Heart of Being: Moral and Ethical Teachings of Zen Buddhism
- The Art of Just Sitting, Second Edition : Essential Writings on the Zen Practice of Shikantaza
- Celebrating Everyday Life: Zen Home Liturgy
- Making Love with Light, a book of nature photography.
- Riding the Ox Home : Stages on the Path of Enlightenment
- The Still Point: A Beginner's Guide to Zen Meditation
- Cave Of Tigers : Modern Zen Encounters
- Invoking Reality: Moral and Ethical Teachings of Zen
- Path of Enlightenment: Stages in a Spiritual Journey
- Two Arrows Meeting in Mid-Air: The Zen Koan
- Mountain Record of Zen Talks
- Teachings of the Insentient: Zen and the Environment

== Translated editions ==
- Das Zen der Kreativitat (German ed.) – 2006 Theseus Verlag, Berlin 3-89620-287-1
- Célébrer la Vie au Quotidien (French ed.): 2003 BDLYS Ed. 2-914395-20-5
- La Recontre de la Réalité (French ed.) by BDLYS Ed. 2-914395-21-3
- El Punto de Quietud (Spanish ed.): 2001 Mandala Ed. 84-95052-69-5
- Hat ein Hund Buddha-Natur? (German ed.): 1996 Taschenbuch Verlag GmbH 9-783596-130191

== Filmography ==
- The Still Point: Introduction to Zen Meditation
- Entering the Mountain Gate: Essentials of Zen
- Oryoki: Formal Monastery Meal
- The Heart of Being: Zen Buddhist Precepts
- Mountain Light Video Library: A Collection of 27 Dharma Discourses
- One Bright Pearl: Dharma Combat
- Enlarging the Universe: Creative Expression
- Fire Keeper: Student Mind
- The Art of Seeing
- The Great Earth's Edict: Zen and Environmentalism

== Recent photography exhibitions ==
- "The Tao of Water", Jan. 18 - Mar. 22, 2008 Gallery at 910, Denver, CO
- "Jinzu", April 19 - June 6, 2007 Gallery at 910, Denver, CO
- "Jinzu", Sept. 8 - Dec. 31, 2006 Buffalo Big Print, Buffalo, New York

== Gallery ==
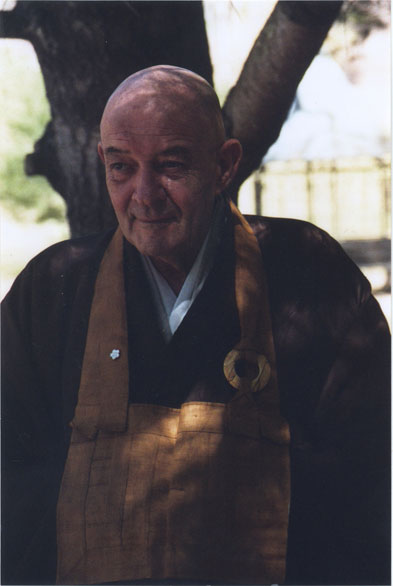

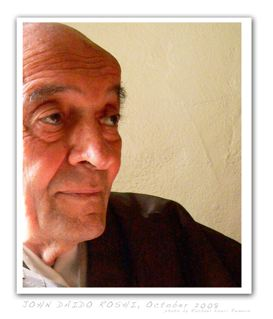

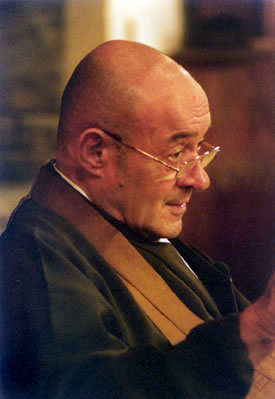

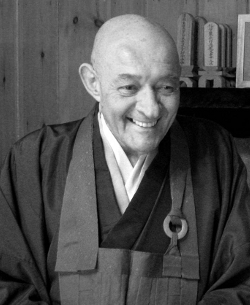

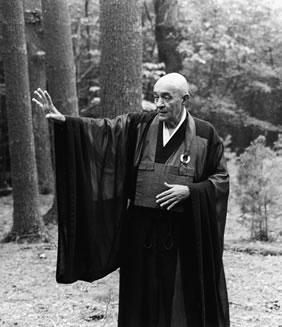

== See also ==
- Buddhism in the United States
- List of Rinzai Buddhists
- Timeline of Zen Buddhism in the United States
