= Curator: The Museum Journal =

- Discipline: Museum Studies
- Language: English
- Edited by: Zahava D. Doering

Publication details
- History: 1958-present
- Publisher: Wiley-Blackwell
- Frequency: Quarterly

Standard abbreviations
- ISO 4: Curator

Indexing
- CODEN: CRTRAH
- ISSN: 0011-3069 (print); 2151-6952 (web)
- LCCN: 59004068
- OCLC no.: 759869043

Links
- Journal homepage; Online access; Online archive

Curator: The Museum Journal is a quarterly peer-reviewed academic journal published by Wiley-Blackwell.

The journal was established in 1958. Its editor-in-chief is Zahava D. Doering (Smithsonian Institution). The journal covers museum administration, research, exhibition development, visitor studies, conservation, museum education, collection management, and other subjects of concern to museum professionals. It is abstracted and indexed in CSA ARTbibliographies Modern.
