= Mountains and Rivers Order =

Organization of Zen temples and centers

- Abbreviation: MRO
- Named after: Zen Master Eihei Dogen’s "Mountains and Rivers Sutra"
- Formation: 1980; 46 years ago
- Founder: John Daido Loori
- Type: Nonprofit, Religious organization
- Purpose: Zen Buddhist practice and training, spiritual education, community service, and the preservation and dissemination of the teachings of Zen Buddhism.
- Headquarters: Zen Mountain Monastery
- Locations: Mount Tremper, New York, United States; New York City, United States
- Region served: Northeastern United States, New Zealand
- Services: Spiritual education, retreats, residency, liturgical supplies
- Website: zmm.org

The Mountains and Rivers Order of Zen Buddhism (MRO) is an organization of associated temples, practice centers and sitting groups in the United States and abroad. The main house is the Zen Mountain Monastery located at the foot of Mount Tremper in the Catskill Mountains of New York, and also includes the Zen Center of New York City in downtown Brooklyn, and affiliate groups. The MRO was founded by Zen Master John Daido Loori, Roshi, in 1980. It is inspired by the teachings of Zen Master Dōgen as presented in his "Mountains and Rivers Sutra" (Sansui kyō). The current head of the order is Geoffrey Shugen Arnold, Roshi.

== Lineage ==
Ancestry is an important part of Zen Buddhism. It is the unbroken chain of transmission from teacher to student, tracing back to the historical Buddha, Shakyamuni. These may not always be completely accurate, but below are the lineages Mountains and Rivers Order, as reported by the organization.

=== Male Ancestors ===
1. Bibashi Butsu Daiosho
2. Shiki Butsu Daiosho
3. Bishafu Butsu Daiosho
4. Kuruson Butsu Daiosho
5. Kunagommuni Butsu Daiosho
6. Kasho Butsu Daiosho
7. Shakyamuni Butsu Daiosho
8. Makakasho Daiosho
9. Ananda Daiosho
10. Shonawashu Daiosho
11. Ubakikuta Daiosho
12. Daitaka Daiosho
13. Mishaka Daiosho
14. Bashumitsu Daiosho
15. Butsudanandai Daiosho
16. Fudamitta Daiosho
17. Barishiba Daiosho
18. Funayasha Daiosho
19. Anabotei Daiosho
20. Kabimora Daiosho
21. Nagyaharajuna Daiosho
22. Kanadaiba Daiosho
23. Ragarata Daiosho
24. Sogyanandai Daiosho
25. Kayashata Daiosho
26. Kumorata Daiosho
27. Shayata Daiosho
28. Bashubanzu Daiosho
29. Man’ura Daiosho
30. Kakuronkuna Daiosho
31. Shishibodai Daiosho
32. Bashashita Daiosho
33. Funyomitta Daiosho
34. Hannyatara Daiosho
35. Bodaidaruma Daiosho
36. Taiso Eka Daiosho
37. Kanchi Sosan Daiosh
38. Daii Doshin Daiosho
39. Daiman Konin Daiosho
40. Daikan Eno Daiosho
41. Seigen Gyoshi Daiosho
42. Sekito Kisen Daiosho
43. Yakusan Igen Daiosho
44. Ungan Donjo Daiosho
45. Tozan Ryokai Daiosho
46. Ungo Doyo Daiosho
47. Doan Dohi Daiosho
48. Doan Kanshi Daiosho
49. Ryozan Enkan Daiosho
50. Taiyo Kyogen Daiosho
51. Toshi Gisei Daiosho
52. Fuyo Dokai Daiosho
53. Tanka Shijun Daiosho
54. Choro Seiryo Daiosho
55. Tendo Sokaku Daiosho
56. Setcho Chikan Daiosho
57. Tendo Nyojo Daiosho
58. Eihei Dogen Daiosho
59. Koun Ejo Daiosho
60. Tettsu Gikai Daiosho
61. Keizan Jokin Daiosho
62. Gasan Joseki Daiosho
63. Taigen Soshin Daiosho
64. Baizan Monpon Daiosho
65. Nyochu Tengin Daiosho
66. Kisan Shosan Daiosho
67. Morin Shihan Daiosho
68. Taishi Sotai Daiosho
69. Kenchu Hantetsu Daiosho
70. Daiju Soko Daiosho
71. Kinpo Jusen Daiosho
72. Tetsuei Seiton Daiosho
73. Shukoku Choton Daiosho
74. Ketsuzan Tetsuei Daiosho
75. Hoshi Soon Daiosho
76. Goho Kainon Daiosho
77. Tenkei Denson Daiosho
78. Zozan Monko Daiosho
79. Niken Sekiryo Daiosho
80. Reitan Roryu Daiosho
81. Kakujo Tosai Daiosho
82. Kakuan Ryogu Daiosho
83. Ryoka Daibai Daiosho
84. Ungan Guhaku Daiosho
85. Baian Hakujun Daiosho
86. Hakuyu Taizan Daiosho
87. Muge Daido Daiosho

Additionally, the Mountains and Rivers Order, recognizing that woman have been important and also forgotten in the history of Buddhism, have composed a list of enlightened women ancestors.

=== Female Ancestors ===
1. Prajna Paramita Daiosho
2. Maha Maya Daiosho
3. Srimala Daiosho
4. Ratnavati Daiosho
5. Mahapajapati Daiosho
6. Khema Daiosho
7. Patachara Daiosho
8. Dhammadinna Daiosho
9. Sukha Daiosho
10. Bhadda Kundalakesa Daiosho
11. Yasodhara Daiosho
12. Kisagotami Daiosho
13. Prabhuta Daishi
14. Sinha Vijurmbhita Daiosho
15. Vasumitra Daishi
16. Zongchi Daiosho
17. Ling Xingpo Daiosho
18. Lingzhao Pang Daishi
19. Liu Tiemo Daiosho
20. Moshan Liaoran Daiosho
21. Miaoxin Daiosho
22. Daoshen Daiosho
23. Huiguang Daiosho
24. Kongshi Daoren Daiosho
25. Yu Daopo Daiosho
26. Huiwen Daiosho
27. Fadeng Daiosho
28. Wenzhao Daiosho
29. Miaocong Daiosho
30. Miadao Daiosho
31. Zenshin Daiosho
32. Zenzo Daiosho
33. Ezen Daiosho
34. Komyo Daiosho
35. Ryonen Daiosho
36. Mugai Nyodai Daiosho
37. Ekan Daiosho
38. Shido Daiosho
39. Konto Ekyu Daiosho
40. Mokufu Sonin Daiosho
41. Myosho Enkan Daiosho
42. Soitsu Daiosho
43. Shotaku Daiosho
44. Soshin Daiosho
45. Bunchi Jo Daiosho
46. Ryonen Gensho Daiosho
47. Satsu Daishi
48. Teijitsu Daiosho
49. Otagaki Rengetsu Daiosho
50. Mizuno Jorin Daiosho
51. Hori Mitsujo Daiosho
52. Ando Dokai Daiosho
53. Yamaguchi Kokan Daiosho
54. Nagazawa Sozen Daiosho
55. Kojima Kendo Daiosho
56. Yoshida Eshun Daiosho
57. Ruth Fuller Sasaki Daiosho
58. Jiyu Kennett Daiosho
59. Katie Byron Daiosho
