= Buddhadharma: The Practitioner's Quarterly =

Buddhist magazine

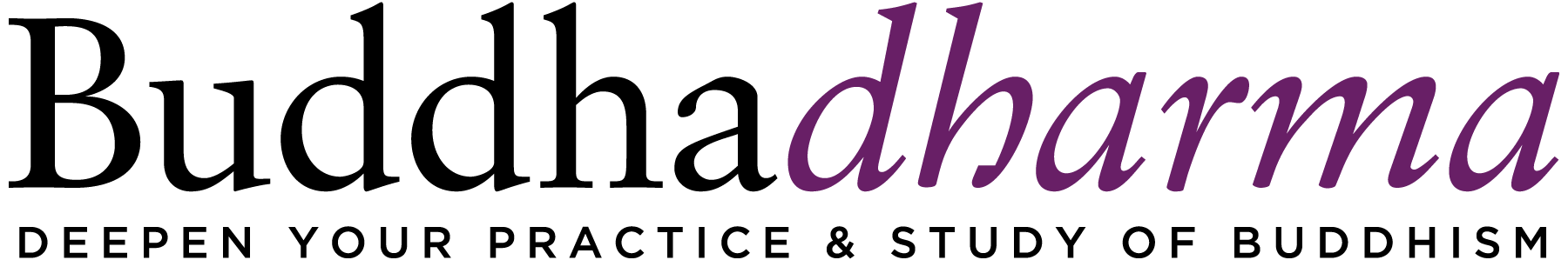

- Cover of the Summer 2008 issue
- Country: Canada
- Based in: Halifax, Nova Scotia
- Language: English

Buddhadharma: The Practitioner's Quarterly is a Buddhist journal presenting articles on Buddhist teachings and practice, with contributions from all Buddhist meditative traditions.

== History and profile ==
Buddhadharma was established in 2002. The first issue appeared on 15 August 2002. The launching editor of the magazine is Tynette Deveaux. It is published by the Lion's Roar Foundation, which also publishes Lion's Roar magazine, with the stated goal of promoting "the growth and development of genuine buddhadharma as Buddhism takes root in the West." The headquarters is in Halifax, Nova Scotia, Canada.

Buddhadharma had a circulation of 27,500 copies as of the Summer, 2008 issue. The magazine's Spring, 2007 issue cover was awarded for "Best Cover" by the Atlantic Journalism Awards
