= Zen Mountain Monastery =

Zen Buddhist monastery and training center

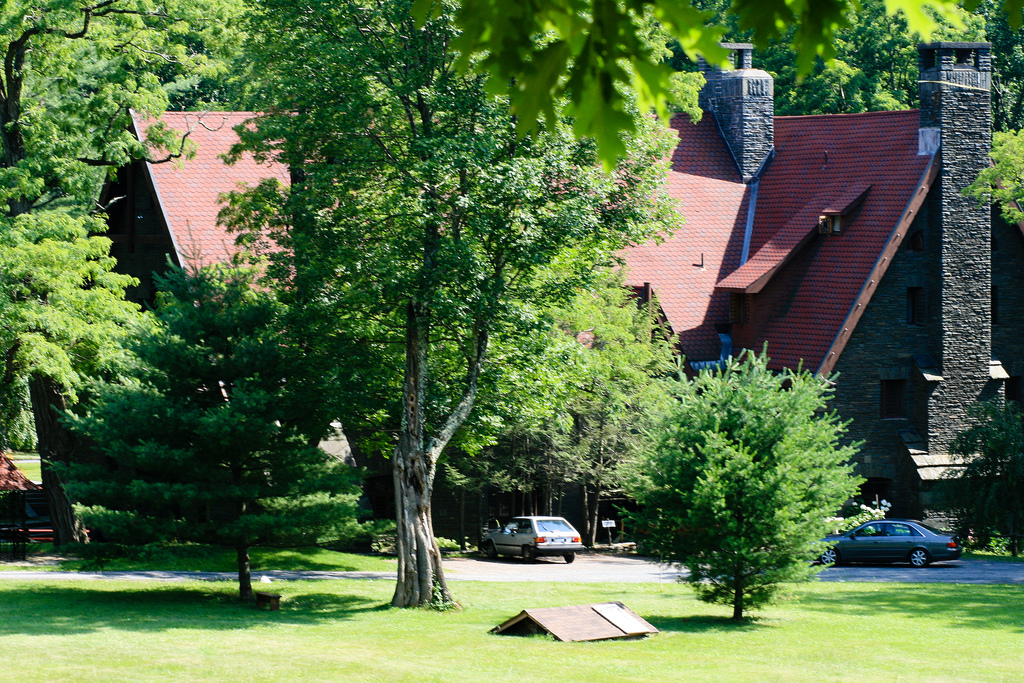

- Location within New York

Monastery information
- Order: Mountains and Rivers Order (Zen)
- Established: 1980

People
- Founder: John Daido Loori
- Abbot: Geoffrey Shugen Arnold
- Prior: Jody Hojin Kimmel

Architecture
- Status: Active
- Functional status: Operational
- Heritage designation: National Register of Historic Places (Designated 1994)

Site
- Location: Mount Tremper, New York
- Country: United States
- Coordinates: 42°2′56″N 74°16′21″W
- Public access: limited
- Website: Zen Mountain Monastery

Zen Mountain Monastery (or, Doshinji, meaning Temple of the Way of Reality) is a Zen Buddhist monastery and training center on a 220-acre (0.89 km^{2}) forested property in the Catskill Mountains in Mount Tremper, New York. It was founded in 1980 by John Daido Loori originally as the Zen Arts Center. It combines the Rinzai and Sōtō Zen traditions, in both of which Loori received Dharma transmission. Loori's first dharma heir was Bonnie Myotai Treace, Sensei, who received shiho, or dharma transmission, from him in 1996. From Loori's death in October 2009 until January 2015, Zen Mountain Monastery had two teachers: Geoffrey Shugen Arnold and Konrad Ryushin Marchaj, who received Dharma transmission from Loori in 1997 and 2009, respectively. Since January 2015, the training at the Monastery has been led by Shugen Roshi, assisted by Ron Hogen Green, Sensei; Jody Hojin Kimmel, Sensei; and Vanessa Zuisei Goddard, Sensei (currently Guiding Teacher of Ocean Mind Sangha).

== History ==
The site the monastery is located on was originally established as Camp Wapanachki in the 1930s. The massive Arts and Crafts style stone and wood frame former retreat house and chapel was built in two phases between about 1935 and 1938. The four story "main house" is the earliest section. It contains living spaces, libraries, a small cellar and a large kitchen. The later section is built of bluestone and contains a dining hall and chapel.

The site was purchased on September 30, 1980 for $100,000 by John Daido Loori (equivalent to $390,751 in 2025).

== Buildings And Grounds ==
Amidst the monastery are various structures which support the residents and the community at large.

=== Main House ===
Constructed between 1929 and 1936 by a Catholic priest along with Norwegian artisans, the main building of the Monastery features bluestone sourced from adjacent cliffs, and white oak pillars harvested from the surrounding hills. This central structure accommodates the meditation hall, dining area, kitchen, common area lounge, private living quarters for monastic and lay residents, and dormitories for guests. In 1994, it was designated as a historic landmark at both the national and state levels.

=== Sangha House ===
Completed in 2012, the Sangha House encompasses a large performance hall used for events and meditation retreats, the Monastery Store, a yoga room, a fitness room, library, art studio, laundry facilities, common bathing facilities, and a tangaryō room.

=== Jizo House ===
In July 2021, the Zen Mountain Monastery completed the construction of the new Jizo House, which replaced the old white cottage across from the monastery garden. Named after Jizo Bodhisattva, it was constructed to better accommodate retreat participants, especially those with mobility issues. This new facility includes an infirmary and end-of-life quarters for monastics and staff. The project, part of a broader initiative to enhance accessibility and inclusivity at the monastery, was documented on the Mountain Record website and further details can be found on the Jizo Project web-page.

=== Administrative Offices ===
Constructed in 2000 on the north side of the Monastery, the administrative offices were designed by Michelle Yoshin Lacaditto (1964 - 2020), an architect and resident at the time. This building serves as the hub for all telecommunications and computer-related activities, including retreat planning, operations for the National Buddhist Prison Sangha, Monastery Store management, as well as graphic design and website development, consolidating these functions within a single location.

=== Tea House ===
This traditional Japanese tea house is situated near the north gate of the monastery. Monastics and seasoned students engage in tea ceremony practices, sharing their knowledge through occasional workshops and other available opportunities.

=== Cemetery ===
Nestled among the pines on an incline above the main structure, the cemetery is the final resting place of the Monastery’s first and second Abbots— Taizan Maezumi Roshi, and John Daido Loori Roshi. Additionally, it serves as the internment site for both monastics and lay students who choose to have their ashes buried there. The cemetery is a sacred site where memorial services are held, along with the yearly Hungry Ghost ceremony.

=== Hermitages ===
Within the Monastery, there are two hermitages, or small cabins, designated for the use of residents and students of the MRO, with permission by the abbot. Situated a quarter mile uphill from the cabins is the Mountain Hermitage. The Dogen Hermitage is positioned past Basho Pond, while the Tea House Hermitage is conveniently situated near the Tea House, adjacent to the Monastery's driveway.

=== A-Frames and Cabin Circle ===
Located up the hill from the Main House, these buildings house lay practitioners in residency at the monastery, as well as monastics.

=== Workshop ===
Adjacent to the parking lot, up an extended driveway, this workshop provides storage and machining capabilities for the monastery.

=== Gardens ===
Providing fresh greens for the kitchen and flowers for the alters, the vegetable garden is located near the Jizo house.

The orchard, located all the way up the hill, by the A-frames, provides fruits for the community. Additional gardens are located throughout the monastery grounds.

== Training ==
Students and residents of the monastery practice according to Daido Roshi's Eight Gates of Zen training matrix. These gates consist of zazen, face-to-face teaching, liturgy, moral and ethical teachings, work practice, body practice, art practice and academic study. Their practice occurs either at home for lay students or at the monastery during weekend retreats and monthly week-long sesshin (meditation intensives). The monastery's schedule includes a Sunday morning program open to the general public and a variety of weekend and week-long Zen training programs, focusing variously on painting, poetry, shakuhachi performance, Japanese archery (kyūdō), qigong, and many other activities.

The monastery grounds are also home to the Zen Environmental Studies Institute and Dharma Communications, which runs The Monastery Store and publishes Mountain Record: An Online Record of The Mountains and Rivers Order of Zen Buddhism and other print, audio, video and online information resources.

In addition to supporting the lay community, ZMM is home to a number of monastic practitioners. These individuals have taken life vows of simplicity, selflessness, stability, service and accomplishing the Buddha's Way. As a result, they do not work outside the monastery, earn money, or have children. As the Mountain Record states: "Monastics in the order are entirely dependent on the sangha while maintaining the Monastery for current practitioners and sustaining it for generations to come."

== Mountains and Rivers Order ==
ZMM is the main house of the Mountains and Rivers Order, an umbrella organization inspired by the teachings of Dogen as found in the Mountains and Rivers Sutra. Founded by John Daido Loori in 1980, it includes the following branches:

1. Dharma Communications is a nonprofit, right livelihood training dojo run at the monastery, and supplies teacher's talks and sitting supplies to home dwelling practitioners. It also creates the Mountain Record the longest running Zen journal published in the USA.
2. Society of Mountains and Rivers is composed of affiliate sitting groups in Buffalo and New Zealand, which hold weekly sitting sessions and visits from the teachers of the Order.
3. National Buddhist Archives which collects and digitizes outstanding documents and media chronicling the history of Buddhism in America thus far, and especially the history of Zen Mountain Monastery.
4. The Zen Environmental Studies Institute sponsors and conducts wilderness retreats, environmental mindfulness workshops, and pursues research on the local environment.
5. National Buddhist Prison Sangha provides teaching supplies and sitting opportunities to inmates currently serving in a correctional facility.
6. Fire Lotus Temple, is the only residential Zen training facility in New York City, offering training opportunities to lay practitioners on a daily basis, along with Saturday retreats and a Sunday program similar to that held at ZMM.

== Gallery ==
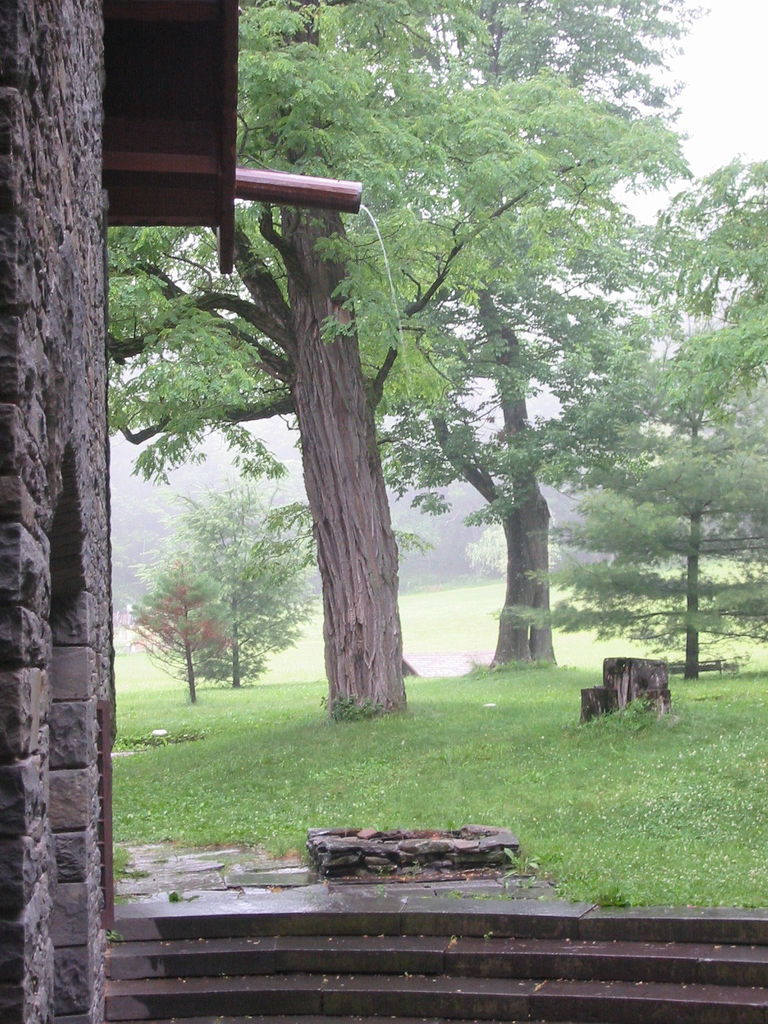

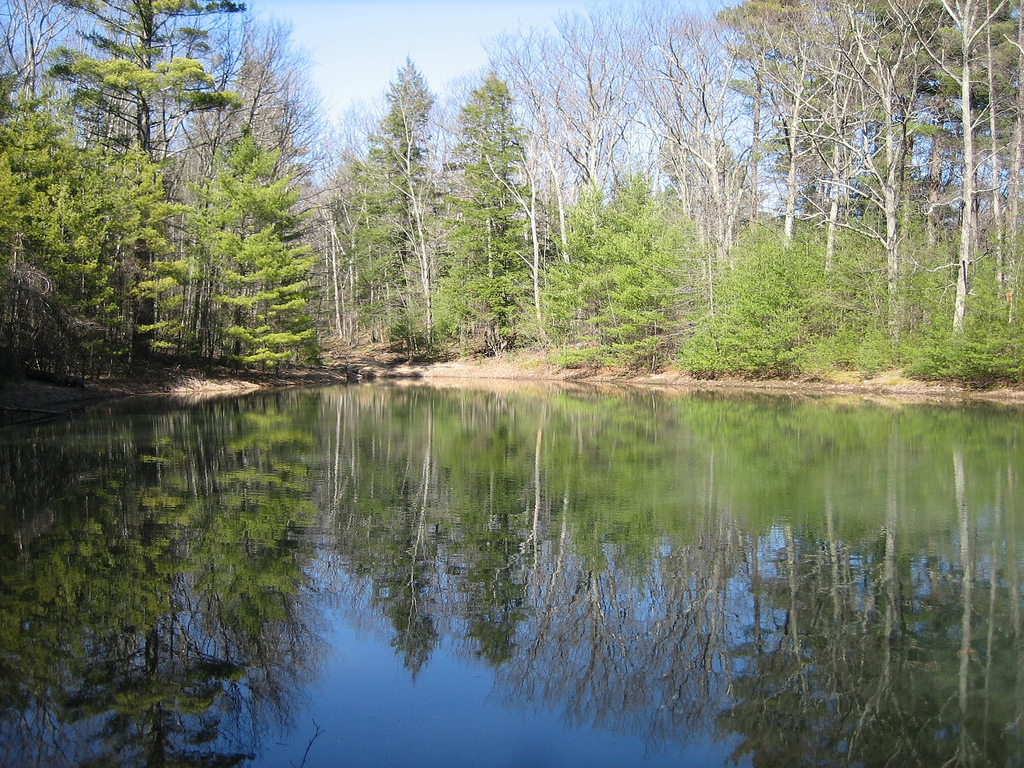

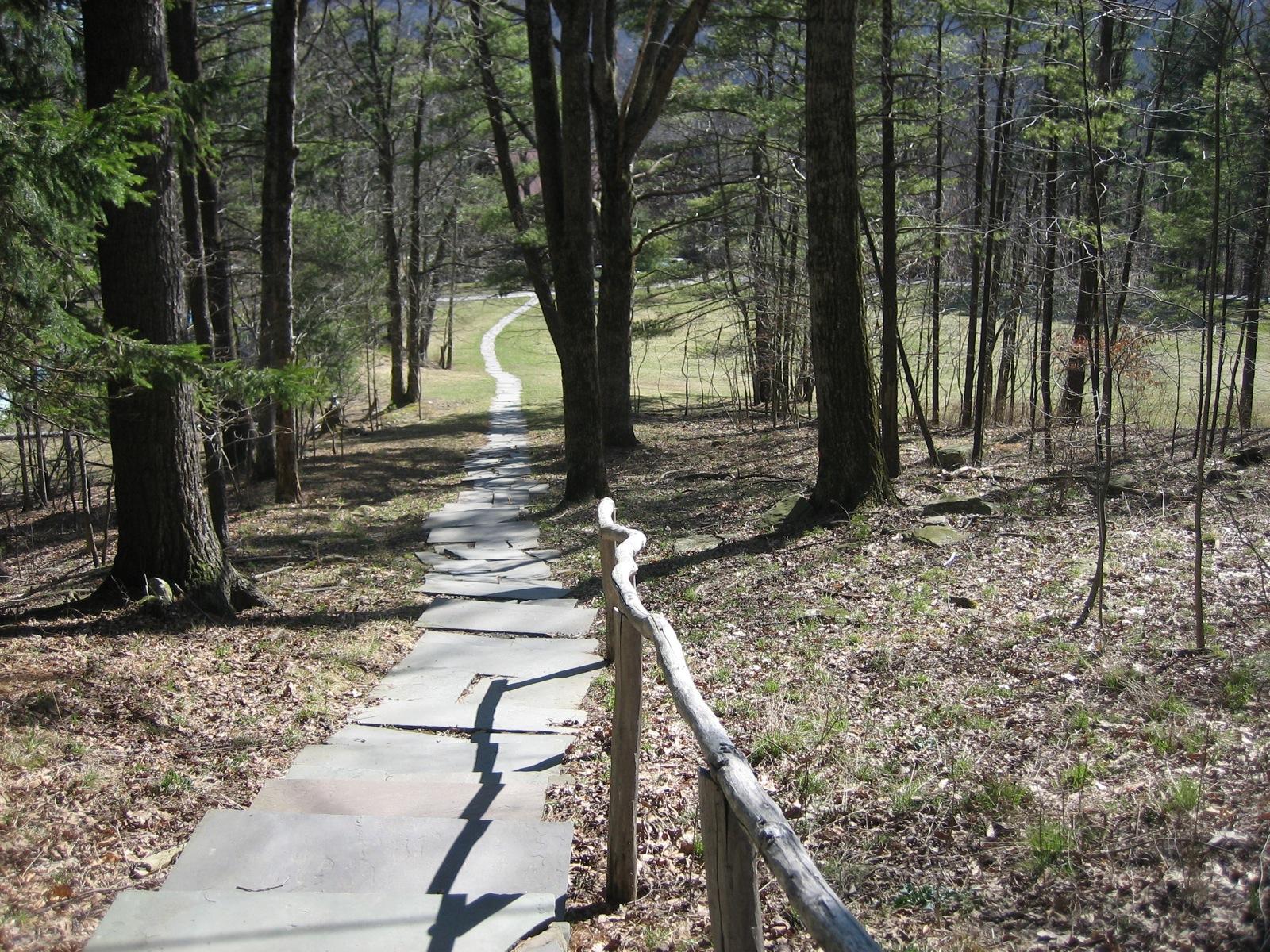

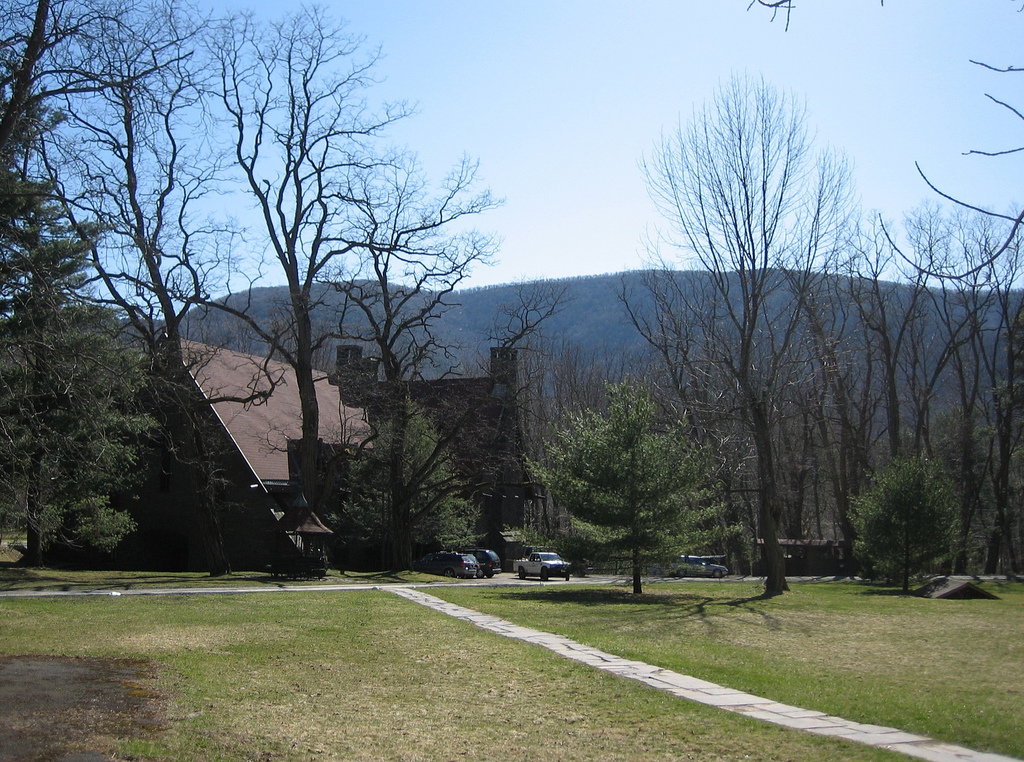

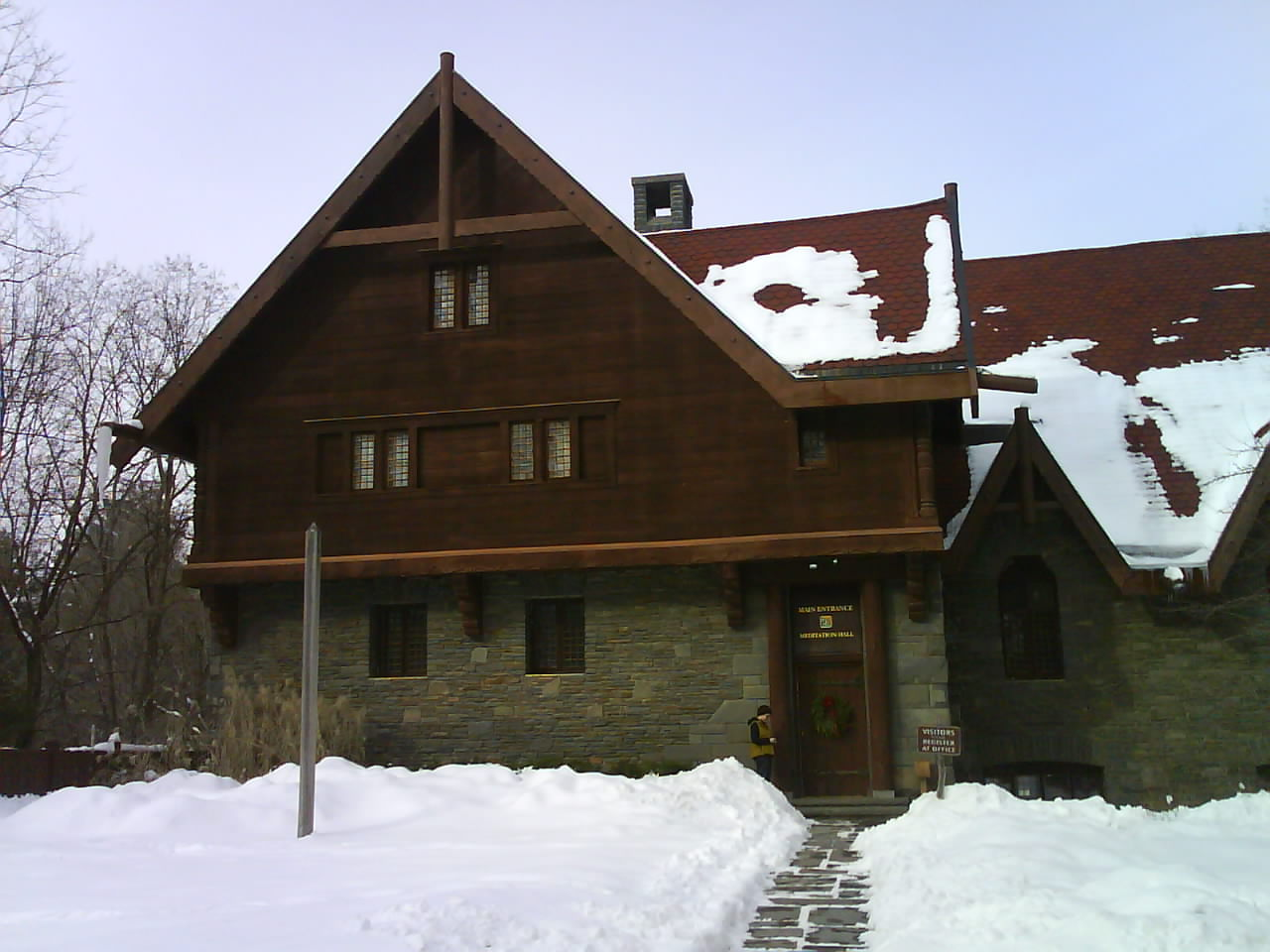

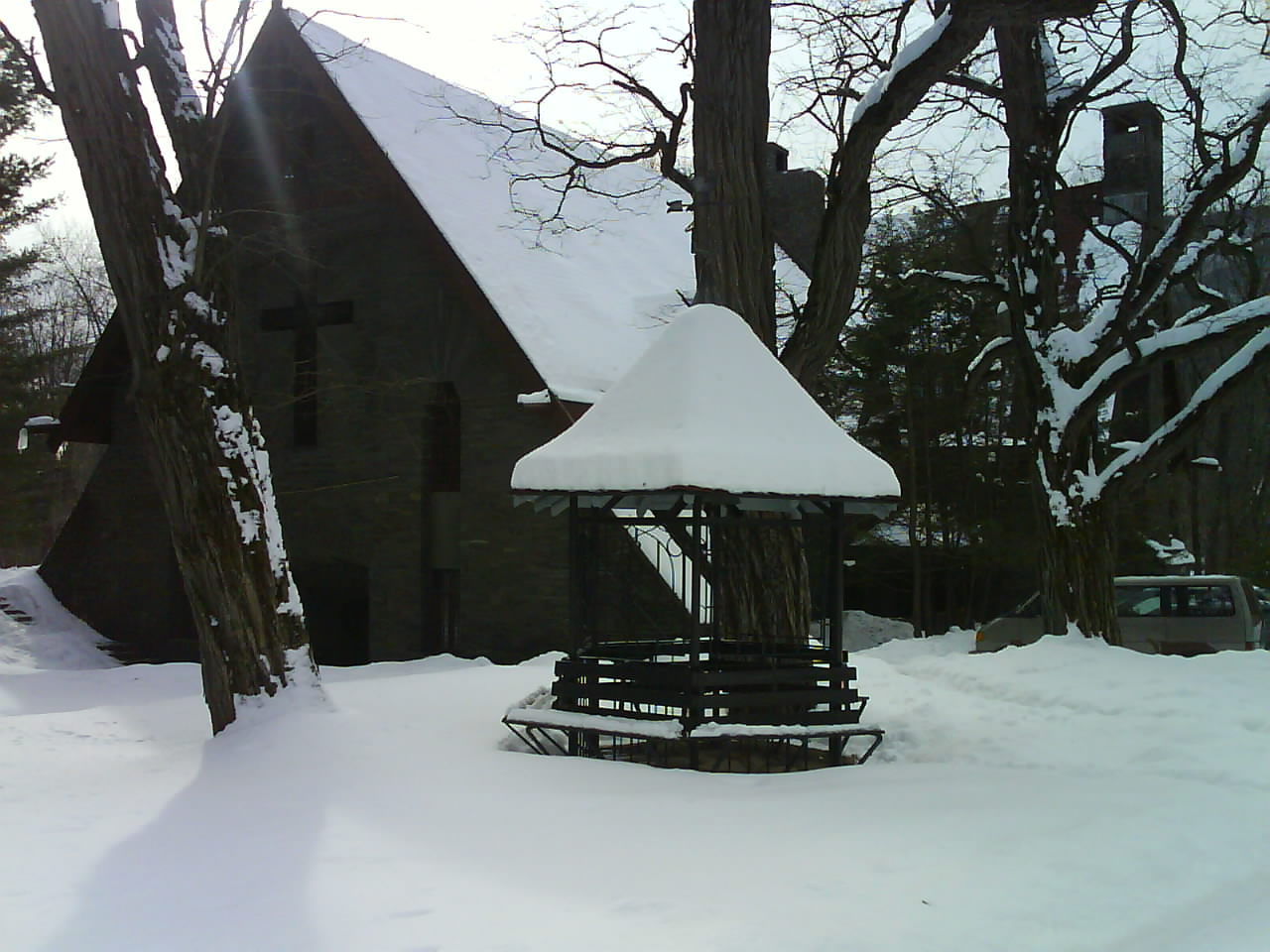

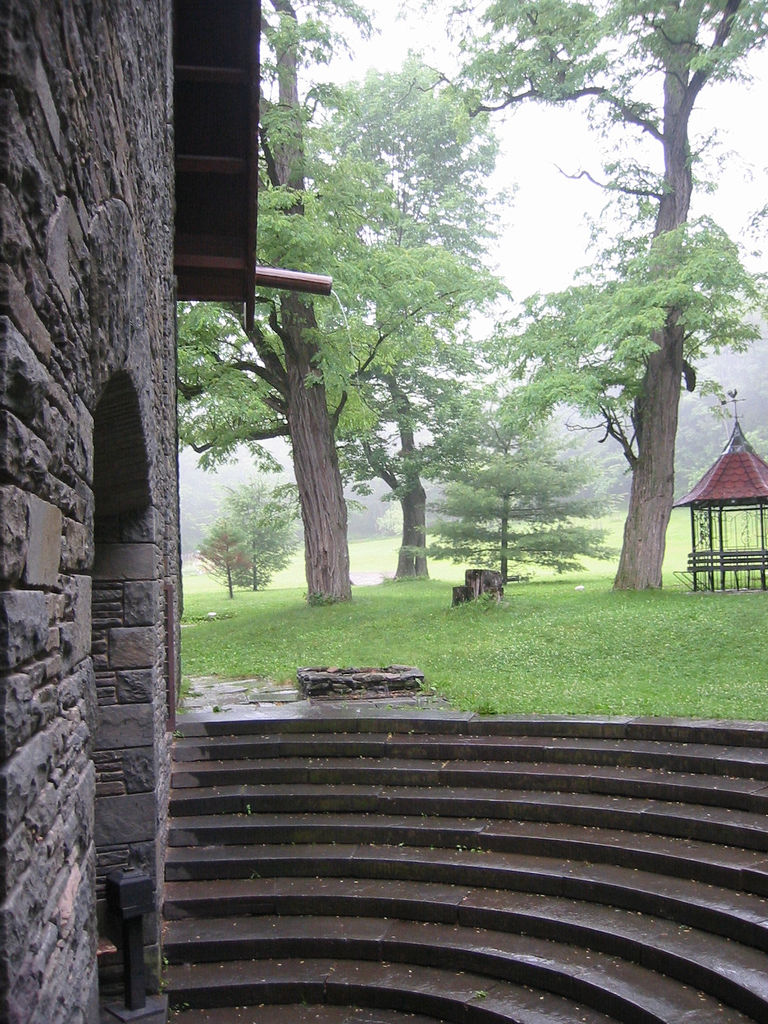

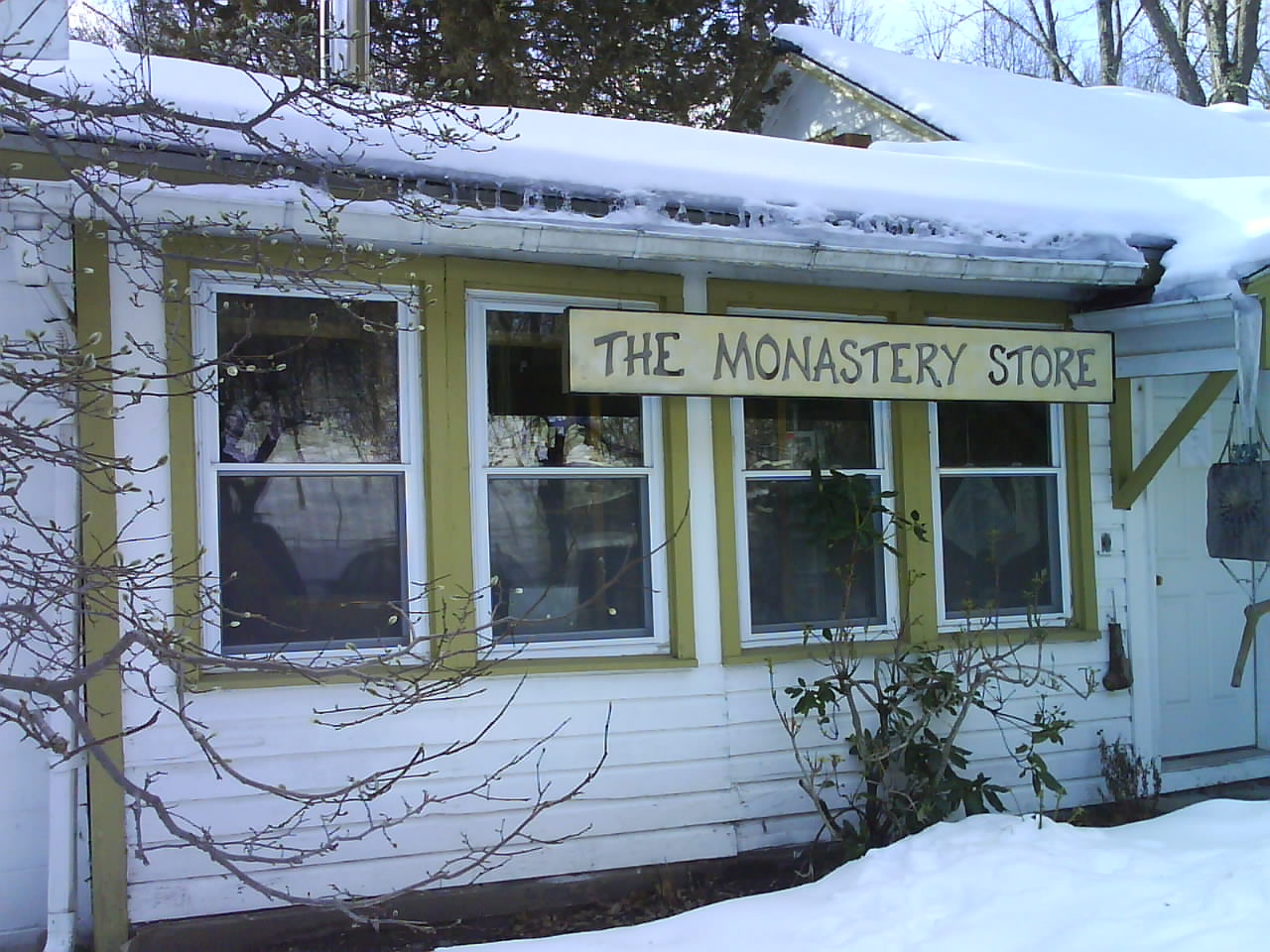
The old Monastery Store (since torn down)

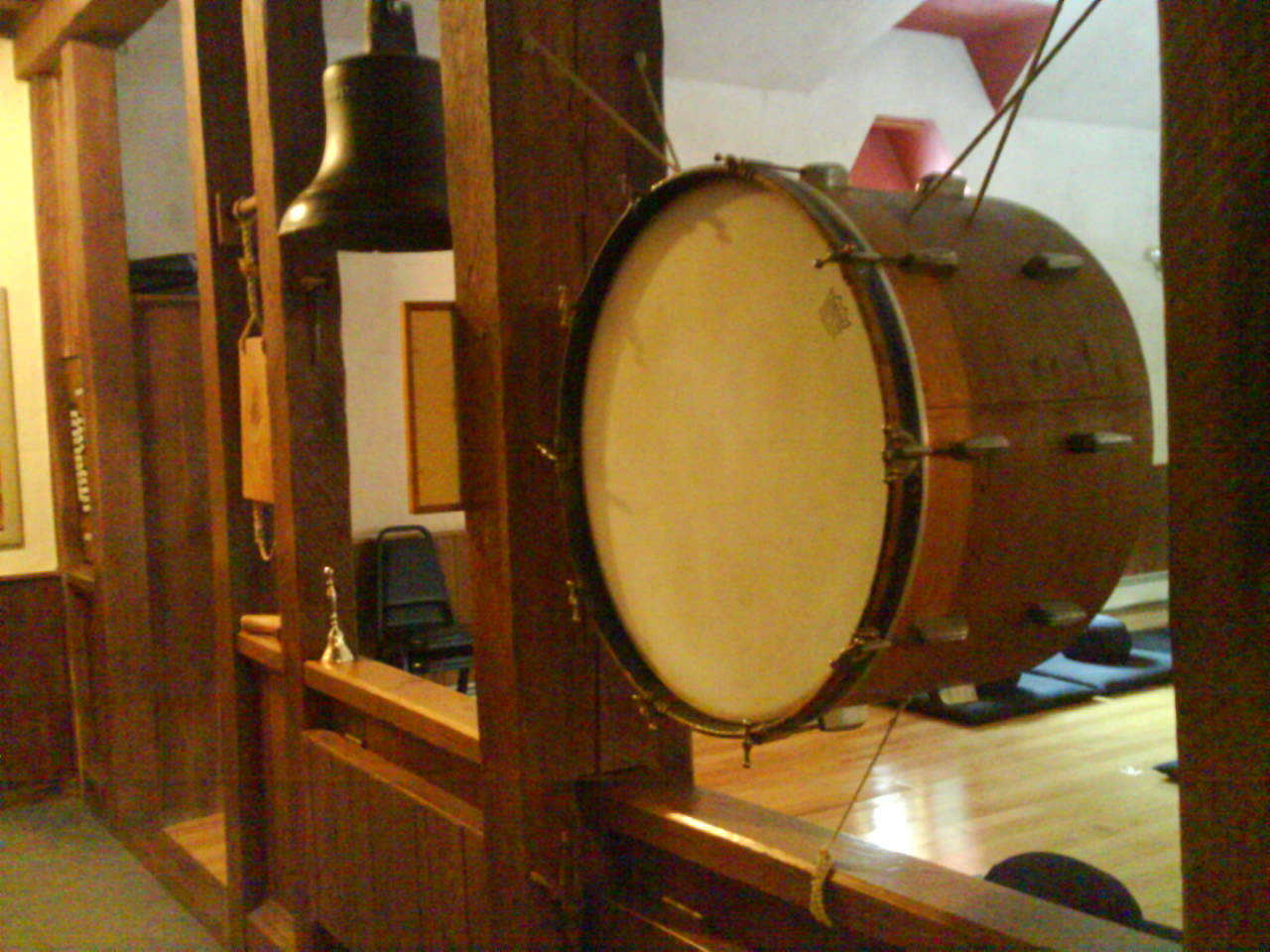
The Zendo Drum and other liturgical instruments

== See also ==
- Timeline of Zen Buddhism in the United States
