= Zen in the United States =

Zen was introduced in the United States at the end of the 19th century by Japanese teachers who went to America to serve groups of Japanese immigrants and become acquainted with the American culture. After World War II, interest from non-Asian Americans grew rapidly. This resulted in the commencement of an indigenous American Zen tradition which also influences the larger western (Zen) world.

== History ==
=== Late 19th century – The Parliament of Religions ===
In 1893, the World Parliament of Religions was held in Chicago. It was a landmark event for the introduction of Asian religions to a western audience. Although most of the delegates to the Parliament were Christians of various denominations, the Buddhist nations of China, Japan, Thailand, and Sri Lanka sent representatives.

In the January 1844, issue of The Dial magazine, the publication of the New England Transcendentalist Club, Henry David Thoreau, one of the great originals of the American Renaissance and author of Walden, introduced a translation of the Parable of the Medicinal Herbs chapter of the Lotus Sutra, a foundational document for Mahayana Buddhism, to the American public.

Japanese Rinzai was represented by Soyen Shaku, the teacher of D.T. Suzuki. Other Buddhist delegates included Zenshiro Noguchi, a Japanese translator; Anagarika Dharmapala, a Sri Lankan associate of H. S. Olcott and the founder of Maha Bodhi Society; and Chandradat Chudhadharn, a brother of King Chulalongkorn of Thailand. Paul Carus also attended as an observer. The Parliament provided the first major public forum from which Buddhists could address the Western public; Dharmapala was particularly effective because he spoke fluent English.

=== Early 20th century – early Zen teachers ===
(Rinzai) Zen Buddhism was the first imported Buddhist trend to put down roots in North America. Though Soyen Shaku, Nyogen Senzaki and Sokei-an, were among the first to reach a western audience, the single most important influence was D.T. Suzuki, who popularized Zen with his extensive writings. Early converts included Ruth Fuller Sasaki.

==== Soyen Shaku ====
In 1893, Soyen Shaku was invited to speak at the World Parliament of Religions held in Chicago. He made the trip to what was then considered the "barbaric" United States, although his associates "discouraged him from attending".

In 1905, a wealthy American couple invited Shaku to stay in the United States. For nine months he lived near San Francisco, where he established a small zendo in the home of Alexander and Ida Russell and gave regular zazen lessons. Shaku became the first Zen Buddhist priest to teach in North America.

==== Nyogen Senzaki ====
Shaku was soon followed by Nyogen Senzaki, a young monk from his home temple in Japan. Senzaki briefly worked for the Russells and then as a hotel porter, manager and eventually, owner. James Ford says Senzaki referred to himself as a "mushroom": no deep root, no branches, no flowers and "probably no seeds". In 1922 Senzaki rented a hall and gave a talk in English on a paper by Shaku; his periodic talks at different locations became known as the "floating zendo". A teacher of Robert Aitken, Senzaki established an itinerant sitting hall from San Francisco to Los Angeles, where he taught until his death in 1958.

==== Sokatsu Shaku and Sokei-an ====
Another Zen teacher named Sokatsu Shaku, one of Shaku's senior students, arrived in late 1906 and founded a Zen meditation center called Ryomokyo-kai. Although he stayed only a few years and had limited contact with the English-speaking public, one of his disciples, Shigetsu Sasaki, made a permanent home in America. Sasaki, better known under his monastic name Sokei-an, spent a few years wandering the west coast of the US. At one point he lived among American Indians near Seattle, and reached New York City in 1916. After completing his training and being ordained in 1928, he returned to New York to teach. In 1931, his small group incorporated as the Buddhist Society of America; it was later renamed the First Zen Institute of America. By the late 1930s, one of his most active supporters was Ruth Fuller Everett, an American socialite and the mother-in-law of Alan Watts. Shortly before Sokei-an's death in 1945, he and Everett would wed, at which point she took the name Ruth Fuller Sasaki.

==== D.T. Suzuki ====
D.T. Suzuki, another Japanese associate of Shaku's, had a great literary impact. At the World Parliament of Religions in 1893, Paul Carus befriended Shaku and requested his help in translating and publishing Oriental spiritual literature in the West. Shaku instead recommended Suzuki, then a young scholar and his former disciple. Starting in 1897, Suzuki worked from Carus' home in Illinois; his first projects were translations of the Tao Te Ching and Asvaghosa's Awakening of Faith in the Mahayana. At the same time, Suzuki began writing Outlines of Mahayana Buddhism, which was published in 1907. Suzuki returned to Japan in 1909 and married Beatrice Erskine Lane, an American Theosophist and Radcliffe graduate, in 1911. Through English language essays and books, such as Essays in Zen Buddhism (1927), he became a visible expositor of Zen Buddhism and its unofficial ambassador to Western readers until his death in 1966. His 1949 book, An Introduction to Zen Buddhism, featured a thirty-page introduction by Carl Jung, an emblem of the deepening relationship between Buddhism and major Western thinkers.

==== Dwight Goddard ====
One American who attempted to establish an American Buddhist movement was Dwight Goddard (1861–1939). Goddard was a Christian missionary to China when he first came in contact with Buddhism. In 1928, he spent a year living in a Zen monastery in Japan. In 1934, he founded "The Followers of Buddha, an American Brotherhood," with the goal of applying the traditional monastic structure of Buddhism more strictly than Senzaki and Sokei-an had previously. The group was largely unsuccessful, as no Americans were recruited to join as monks and attempts failed to attract a Chinese Chan (Zen) master to come to the United States. However, Goddard's efforts as an author and publisher bore considerable fruit: in 1930, he began publishing ZEN: A Buddhist Magazine. In 1932, he collaborated with D. T. Suzuki on a translation of the Lankavatara Sutra. That same year, he published the first edition of A Buddhist Bible, an anthology of Buddhist scriptures focusing on those used in Chinese and Japanese Zen.

=== 1950s – Beat Zen ===
In the late 1940s and 1950s, writers associated with the Beat Generation, including Gary Snyder, Jack Kerouac, Allen Ginsberg, Philip Whalen, and Kenneth Rexroth, took a serious interest in Zen (Note: Andre van de Braak, ZEN SPIRITUALITY IN A SECULAR AGE. Charles Taylor and Zen Buddhism in the West) which increased its visibility. In 1951, Daisetz Teitaro Suzuki returned to the United States to take a visiting professorship at Columbia University, where his open lectures attracted many members of the literary, artistic, and cultural elite. In 1958, Chicago Review published a special issue on Zen, featuring works by the beat poets alongside Zen writings in translation.

=== 1960s – Growing popularity ===
In the 1960s, there was a growing interest in Zen. The Soto-priests Shunryu Suzuki and Taizan Maezumi were especially influential in the spread of Zen. Suzuki's San Francisco Zen Center and Maezumi's Zen Center of Los Angeles grew into large centers, attracting huge numbers of practitioners.

=== 1980s – Scandals ===
The 1980s saw a series of scandals involving Zen teachers whose charismatic authority had led to misconduct. In 1983, the San Francisco Zen Center experienced a sex scandal resulting in the resignation of abbot Richard Baker. Taizan Maezumi slept with several of his students at the Zen Center of Los Angeles before dying of alcoholism.

Sandra Bell has analysed the scandals at Vajradhatu and the San Francisco Zen Center and concluded that these kinds of scandals are

... most likely to occur in organisations that are in transition between the pure forms of charismatic authority that brought them into being and more rational, corporate forms of organization".

Robert Sharf also mentions charisma from which institutional power is derived, and the need to balance charismatic authority with institutional authority. Elaborate analyses of these scandals are made by Stuart Lachs, who mentions the uncritical acceptance of religious narratives, such as lineages and dharma transmission, which aid in giving uncritical charismatic powers to teachers and leaders.

The scandals eventually led to rules of conduct by the American Zen Teachers Association, and the reorganising of Zen Centers, to spread the management of those centers over a wider group of people and diminish the role of charismatic authority.

== Japanese Rinzai ==
=== Contemporary Rinzai teachers ===
Contemporary Rinzai Zen teachers in United States have included Kyozan Joshu Sasaki Roshi, Eido Tai Shimano Roshi, and Omori Sogen Roshi (d. 1994). Sasaki founded the Mount Baldy Zen Center and its branches after coming to Los Angeles from Japan in 1962. One of his students was the Canadian poet and musician Leonard Cohen. Eido Roshi founded Dai Bosatsu Zendo Kongo-ji, a training center in New York state. Omori Roshi founded Daihonzan Chozen-ji, the first Rinzai headquarters temple established outside Japan, in Honolulu; under his students Tenshin Tanouye Roshi and Dogen Hosokawa Roshi and their dharma heirs, several other training centers were established including Daiyuzenji in Chicago and Korinji in Wisconsin.

== Factors of Zen Diffusion in America ==
For Japanese Zen Buddhism to transplant and grow roots in America, a significant diffusion took place. From its introduction in the late 19th century to present day, Zen went through many stages to establish itself in American culture. There are six pivotal factors that can be attributed to this spread and its impact on the future.

1. Predisposition of the source culture to export elements of its own culture.
2. Pressure on the institutional agencies involved in exporting a culture pattern.
3. Preparatory culture contacts.
4. Selective receptivity of American culture.
5. Proclivity of people to the new culture pattern.
6. Strategies adopted by institutions engaged in implanting the new cultural form.

== Japanese Soto ==
=== Soyu Matsuoka ===
Soyu Matsuoka-roshi established the Chicago Buddhist Temple in 1949 (now the Zen Buddhist Temple of Chicago) and provided Sōtō Zen training and lectures in both America and Japan. Matsuoka-roshi also served as superintendent and abbot of the Long Beach Zen Buddhist Temple and Zen Center. Matsuoka-Roshi was born in Japan into a family of Zen priests dating back six hundred years. In the 1930s he was sent to America by Sōtōshū, the Sōtō Zen Buddhist authority in Japan, to establish the Sōtō Zen tradition in the United States. He founded Sōtō Zen temples in both Los Angeles and San Francisco. He also furthered his graduate work at Columbia with D.T. Suzuki. He relocated from Chicago to establish a temple at Long Beach in 1971 after leaving the Zen Buddhist Temple of Chicago to his dharma heir Kongo Richard Langlois, Roshi. He returned to Chicago in 1995, where he died in 1998.

=== Shunryu Suzuki ===
Sōtō Zen Priest Shunryu Suzuki (no relation to D.T. Suzuki) arrived in San Francisco in 1959 to lead an established Japanese congregation. He soon attracted American students and "beatniks", who formed a core of students who would go on to create the San Francisco Zen Center and its eventual network of Zen centers across the country, including the Tassajara Zen Mountain Center, the first Buddhist monastery in the Western world. His low-key teaching style was described in the popular book Zen Mind, Beginner's Mind, a compilation of his talks.

== Sanbo Kyodan ==
Sanbo Kyodan is a contemporary Japanese Zen lineage which had an impact in the West disproportionate to its size in Japan. It is rooted in the reformist teachings of Harada Daiun Sogaku (1871–1961) and his disciple Yasutani Hakuun (1885–1971), who argued that the existing Zen institutions of Japan (Sōtō and Rinzai sects) had become complacent and were generally unable to convey real Dharma. Harada had studied with both Soto and Rinzai teachers, and Yasutani founded Sanbo Kyodan in 1954 to preserve what he saw as the vital core of teachings from both schools.

=== Philip Kapleau ===
Sanbo Kyodan's first American member was Philip Kapleau, who first traveled to Japan in 1945 as a court reporter for the war crimes trials. In 1947, Kapleau visited D. T. Suzuki at Engaku-ji in Japan and in the early 1950s was a frequent attendee of Suzuki's Columbia lectures. In 1953, he returned to Japan, where he met with Nakagawa Soen, a protégé of Nyogen Senzaki. At Nakagawa's recommendation, he began to study with Harada and later with Yasutani. In 1965, he published a book, The Three Pillars of Zen, which recorded a set of talks by Yasutani outlining his approach to practice, along with transcripts of dokusan interviews and some additional texts.

The book and Sanbo Kyodan's approach became popular in America and Europe. In 1965 Kapleau returned to America and, in 1966, established the Rochester Zen Center in Rochester, New York, making him the first American-born Zen priest to found a training temple. In 1967, Kapleau had a falling-out with Yasutani over Kapleau's moves to Americanize his temple, after which it became independent of Sanbo Kyodan. This created questions regarding lineage since Kapleau never officially was granted transmission from Yasutani. The Rochester Zen Center is now led by Bodhin Kjolhede with a network of related centers in the United States, Europe, Mexico, and New Zealand, referred to collectively as the Cloud Water Sangha.

One of Kapleau's early disciples was Toni Packer, who left Rochester in 1981 to found a nonsectarian meditation center, not specifically Buddhist or Zen.

=== Robert Aitken ===
Robert Aitken (June 19, 1917 – August 5, 2010) was another American member of Sanbo Kyodan. He was introduced to Zen as a prisoner in Japan during World War II. After returning to the United States, he studied with Nyogen Senzaki in Los Angeles in the early 1950s. In 1959, while still a Zen student, he founded the Diamond Sangha, a zendo in Honolulu, Hawaii. Three years later the Diamond Sangha hosted the first US visit by Yasutani Hakuun, who visited the US six more times before 1969. Aitken traveled frequently to Japan and became a disciple of Yamada Koun, Yasutani's successor as head of the Sanbo Kyodan. Aitken and the Diamond Sangha first hosted Eido Tai Shimano's immigration to the U.S., encouraged by Soen Nakagawa. Aitken became a dharma heir of Yamada's, authored more than ten books, and developed the Diamond Sangha into an international network with temples in the United States, Argentina, Germany, and Australia. In 1995, he and his organization split with Sanbo Kyodan in response to reorganization of the latter following Yamada's death. The Diamond Sangha network includes a number of practice centers in the U.S. and abroad. The Diamond Sangha Teachers' Circle, an international group of Aitken Roshi's successors (1st and 2nd generation), meets every 18 months. The Pacific Zen Institute led by John Tarrant, Aitken's first Dharma successor, continues as an independent Zen line.

=== White Plum Asanga ===
Another Japanese Zen teacher was Taizan Maezumi, who arrived as a young priest to serve at Zenshuji, the North American Sōtō sect headquarters in Los Angeles, in 1956. Like Shunryu Suzuki, he showed considerable interest in teaching Zen to Americans of various backgrounds and, by the mid-1960s, had formed a regular zazen group. In 1967, he and his supporters founded the Zen Center of Los Angeles. He was later instrumental in establishing the Kuroda Institute and the Soto Zen Buddhist Association, the latter an organization of American teachers with ties to the Soto tradition. In addition to his membership in Soto, Maezumi was recognized as an heir by a Rinzai teacher and by Yasutani Hakuun of the Sanbo Kyodan. Maezumi, in turn, had several American dharma heirs, such as Bernie Glassman, John Daido Loori, Charlotte Joko Beck, and Dennis Genpo Merzel. His successors and their network of centers became the White Plum Asanga.

== Chinese Chán ==
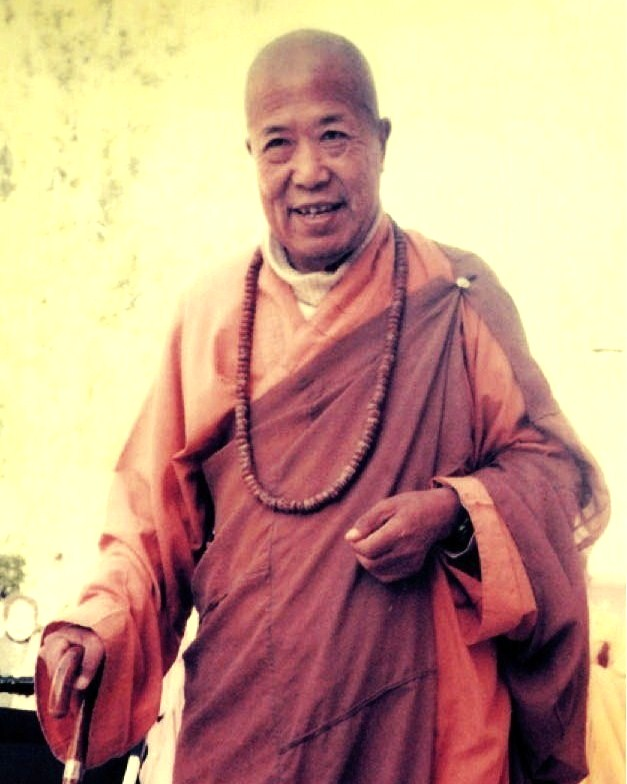
Hsuan Hua in 2010

Not all successful Zen teachers in the United States have been from Japanese traditions. Some were teachers of Chinese Zen (known as Chán), Korean Zen (or Seon), and Vietnamese Zen (or Thien).

=== Hsuan Hua ===
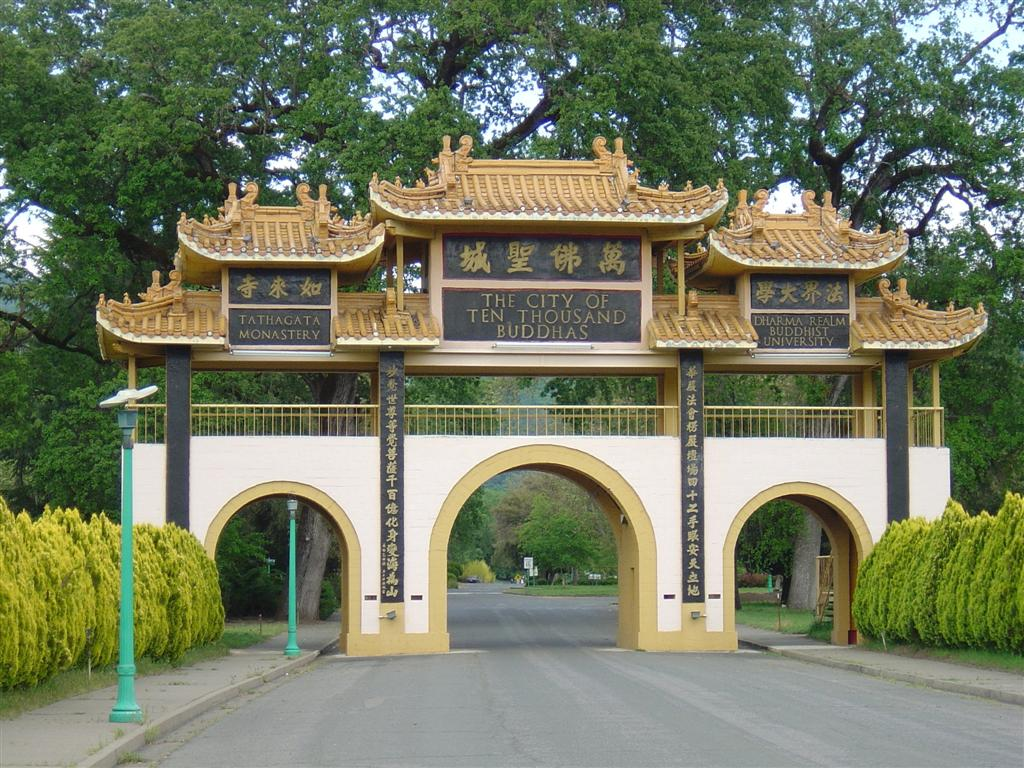
The 480-acre (1.9 km^{2}) City of Ten Thousand Buddhas founded by Hsuan Hua in Talmage, California is geographically the largest Buddhist community in the western hemisphere.

The first Chinese Buddhist monk to teach Westerners in America was Hsuan Hua, a disciple of the 20th-century Chan master, Hsu Yun. In 1962, Hsuan Hua moved to San Francisco's Chinatown, where, in addition to Zen, he taught Chinese Pure Land, Tiantai, Vinaya, and Vajrayana Buddhism. Initially, his students were mostly ethnic Chinese, but he eventually attracted a range of followers. In 1970, Hsuan Hua founded Gold Mountain Monastery in San Francisco and in 1976 he established a retreat center, the City Of Ten Thousand Buddhas, on a 237-acre (959,000 m²) property in Talmage, California. These monasteries closely adhere to the vinaya, the austere traditional Buddhist monastic code. Hsuan Hua also founded the Buddhist Text Translation Society, which translates scriptures into English.

=== Sheng-yen ===
Another Chinese Chán teacher with a Western following was Sheng-yen, trained in both the Caodong and Linji schools (equivalent to the Japanese Soto and Rinzai, respectively). He first visited the United States in 1978 under the sponsorship of the Buddhist Association of the United States, an organization of Chinese American Buddhists. In 1980, he founded the Chán Mediation Society in Queens, New York. In 1985, he founded the Chung-hwa Institute of Buddhist Studies in Taiwan, which sponsors Chinese Zen activities in the United States.

In 1992, Shi Yan Ming, a 34th Generation Shaolin monk of the Caodong lineage, came to America and founded the USA Shaolin Temple in New York City. Construction has recently begun on a full-size Shaolin temple in Fleischmanns, New York.

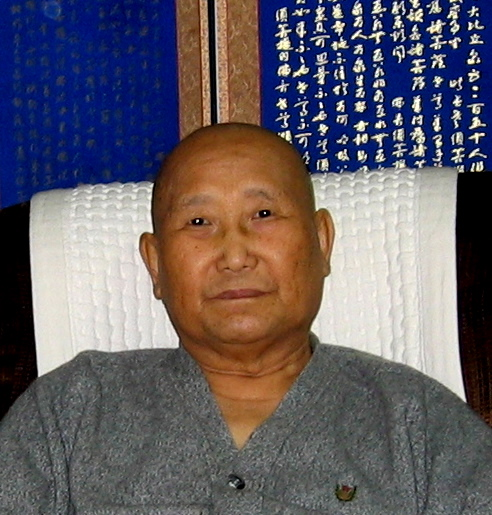
Seung Sahn in 2002

== Korean Seon ==
Seung Sahn was an influential Korean Zen teacher in America. He was a temple abbot in Seoul and after living in Hong Kong and Japan, he moved to the US in 1972, not speaking any English. On the flight to Los Angeles, a Korean American passenger offered him a job at a laundry in Providence, Rhode Island, which became headquarters of Seung Sahn's Kwan Um School of Zen. Shortly after arriving in Providence, he attracted students and founded the Providence Zen Center. The Kwan Um School has more than 100 Zen centers on six continents.

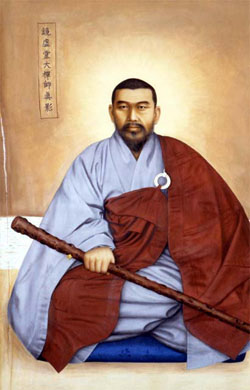
Kyong Ho

Another Korean Zen teacher, Samu Sunim, founded Toronto's Zen Buddhist Temple in 1971. He is head of the Buddhist Society for Compassionate Wisdom, which has temples in Ann Arbor, Chicago, Mexico City, and New York City.

In the early 20th century, Master Kyong Ho (1849–1912), reenergized Korean Seon. At the end of World War II, his disciple, Master Mann Gong (1871–1946), proclaimed that lineage Dharma should be transmitted worldwide to encourage peace through enlightenment. Consequently, his Dharma successor, Hye Am (1884–1985) brought lineage Dharma to the United States. Hye Am's Dharma successor, Myo Vong founded the Western Son Academy (1976), and his Korean disciple, Pohwa Sunim, founded World Zen Fellowship (1994) which includes various Zen centers in the United States, such as the Potomac Zen Sangha, the Patriarchal Zen Society and the Baltimore Zen Center.

== Vietnamese Thiền ==
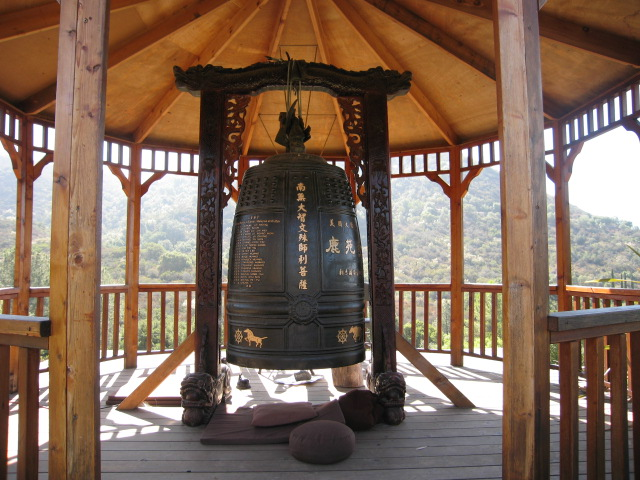
Deer Park Monastery

Vietnamese Zen teachers in America include Thich Thien-An and Thich Nhat Hanh. Thich Thien-An came to America in 1966 as a visiting professor at UCLA and taught traditional Thien meditation. Thich Nhat Hanh was a monk in Vietnam during the Vietnam War. He was a peace activist nominated for the Nobel Peace Prize in 1967 by Martin Luther King Jr. In 1966, he left Vietnam in exile and established the Plum Village Monastery in France. He founded the Order of Interbeing and wrote more than one hundred books about Buddhism, which made him a popular Buddhist author in the West. In his books and talks, Thich Nhat Hanh emphasized mindfulness (sati) as the most important practice in daily life. His monastic students live and practice at three centers in the United States: Deer Park Monastery in Escondido, California, Blue Cliff Monastery in Pine Bush, New York, and Magnolia Grove Monastery in Batesville, Mississippi.

== See also ==
- Timeline of Zen Buddhism in the United States
- List of American Buddhists
- Buddhism in the United States
- Religion in the United States
- United States religious history
- Western Buddhism

== Sources ==
- Bell, Sandra (2002), Scandals in emerging Western Buddhism. In: Westward Dharma: Buddhism beyond Asia. Pages 230-242 (PDF), Berkeley: University of California Press
- Ford, James Ishmael (2006). Zen Master Who?. Wisdom Publications. ISBN 0-86171-509-8.
- Goddard, Dwight (2009) [1932], A Buddhist Bible, BiblioBazaar, LLC, ISBN 978-0-559-10995-9
- Lachs, Stuart (1999), Means of Authorization: Establishing Hierarchy in Ch'an /Zen Buddhism in America
- Lachs, Stuart (2002), Richard Baker and the Myth of the Zen Roshi
- Lachs, Stuart (2006), The Zen Master in America: Dressing the Donkey with Bells and Scarves
- Lachs, Stuart (2011), When the Saints Go Marching In: Modern Day Zen Hagiography (PDF)
- McMahan, David L. (2008), The Making of Buddhist Modernism, Oxford University Press, ISBN 9780195183276
- Prebish, Charles S. (1999). Luminous Passage: The Practice and Study of Buddhism and America. University of California Press. ISBN 0-520-21697-0.
- Sharf, Robert H. (1995), "Sanbokyodan. Zen and the Way of the New Religions" (PDF), Japanese Journal of Religious Studies, 22 (3–4)
- Vong, Myo (2008), Cookies of Zen, Seoul, South Korea: EunHaeng NaMu, ISBN 978-89-5660-257-8
- Wright, Dale S. (2010), Humanizing the Image of a Zen master: Taizan Maezumi Roshi. In: Zen Masters, edited bySteven Heine and Dale S. Wright, Oxford: Oxford University Press
