= Timeline of Zen Buddhism in the United States =

Below is a timeline of important events regarding Zen Buddhism in the United States. Dates with "?" are approximate.

== Events ==
=== Early history ===
- 1893: Soyen Shaku comes to the United States to lecture at the World Parliament of Religions held in Chicago
- On November 18, 1903, Rev. Sokyo Ueoka, head minister of Tokujuan Soto Zen Temple in Honichi, Nuta Higashi Village. Toyota—gun (present day Mihara City), Hiroshima Prefecture. received an assignment to become a visiting minister to Japanese immigrants in Hawaii. Arriving in Honolulu on July 9, 1904 he built a temporary temple in the Aiea plantation. Upon the request of Japanese residents on Maui, he moved to Lower Paia on November 7, 1906 with his wife, Tomiyo, who joined him from Japan. Through the initiative of Sukesaburo Yamazaki, Kikujiro Soga, and Unosuke Ogawa, he leased a half-acre of land for 15 years from local Hawaiians. This site was adjacent to the present Paia Fire Station and behind the former County Courthouse. The construction of the temple began in March 1907 with a ceremony officiated by Rev. Ryoun Kan of Zenshuji Soto Zen Temple of Kauai. Rev. Kan is considered to be the honorary founder of Mantokuji with the title "Kanjyo Kaisan", while Rev. Sokyo Ueoka is the official founder or "Kaisan" of Mantokuji. The official title of the temple, given by the head temple in Japan, is “Machozan Mantokuji".
- 1905: Soyen Shaku returns to the United States and teaches for approximately one year in San Francisco
- 1906: Sokei-an arrives in San Francisco
- 1919: Soyen Shaku dies on October 29 in Japan
- 1922: Zenshuji Soto Mission is established in the Little Tokyo section of Los Angeles, California
- 1922: Nyogen Senzaki begins teaching in California with his "floating zendō"
- 1930: Sokei-an establishes the Buddhist Society of America (now First Zen Institute of America)
- 1932: Dwight Goddard authors A Buddhist Bible, an anthology focusing on Chinese and Japanese Zen scriptures
- 1938: Ruth Fuller Sasaki became a principal supporter of the Buddhist Society of America (later known as the First Zen Institute of America),
- 1939 Zengaku Soyu Matsuoka arrives in America
- 1945: Sokei-an dies
- 1949: Soyu Matsuoka establishes the Chicago Buddhist Temple (now the Zen Buddhist Temple of Chicago)
- 1949: Soen Nakagawa makes his first trip to the United States to meet with Nyogen Senzaki

=== 1950s ===
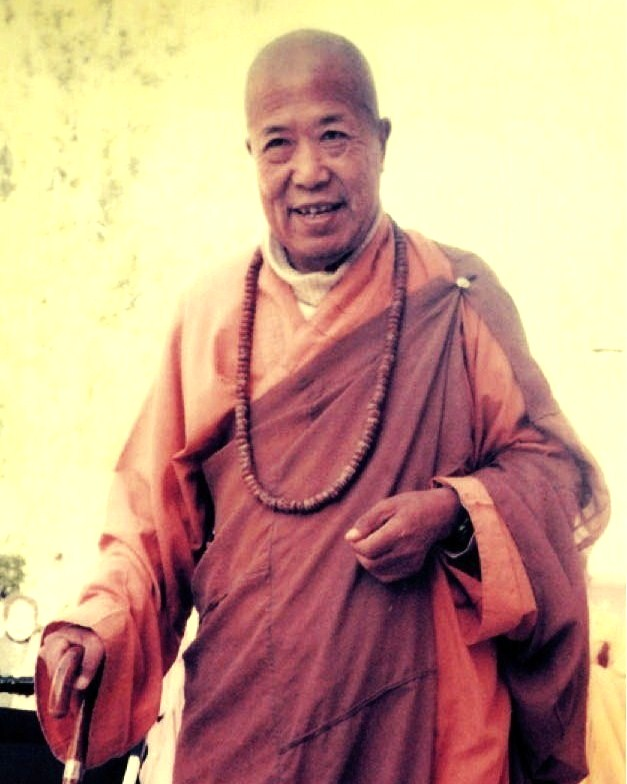
Hsuan Hua, America's first Chinese Chan teacher.

- 1951: DT Suzuki begins teaching seminars on Japanese culture, aesthetics, and Zen at Columbia University in New York. Among the students are many influential artists and intellectuals, including Erich Fromm, Karen Horney, John Cage, and Allen Ginsberg.
- 1953: Philip Kapleau begins formal Zen training in Japan.
- 1956: Taizan Maezumi arrives in Los Angeles to serve at the Zenshuji Soto Mission
- 1956: The Zen Studies Society is established by Cornelius Crane
- 1957: Alan Watts' The Way of Zen is published, the book first popularizing zen with an American audience
- 1957: The Cambridge Buddhist Association is founded by John and Elsie Mitchell in Cambridge, Massachusetts
- 1957: Jack Kerouac's novel The Dharma Bums is published
- 1958: Nyogen Senzaki dies on May 7
- 1959: Shunryu Suzuki arrives in San Francisco to lead Sokoji
- 1959: Hsuan Hua arrives in the United States and establishes the Dharma Realm Buddhist Association
- 1959: Robert Baker Aitken and Anne Hopkins Aitken found the Diamond Sangha in Honolulu, Hawaii

=== 1960s ===
- 1960: Thich Nhat Hanh came from Vietnam to the United States to study and teach until 1963. He created the Order of Interbeing in 1966.
- 1962: Kyozan Joshu Sasaki, a Rinzai Rōshi, arrives in Los Angeles, teaches in homes, and opens the Cimarron Zen Center in 1968. It later was renamed Rinzai-ji.
- 1962: Rinzai monk (possible fraud) Eido Tai Shimano moves to Hawaii to assist Diamond Sangha and Robert Aitken.
- 1962: The San Francisco Zen Center is incorporated, led by Shunryu Suzuki
- 1964: Eido Tai Shimano (possible fraud) moves to New York and becomes guiding teacher of the Zen Studies Society
- 1965: Philip Kapleau finishes The Three Pillars of Zen and returns to United States with permission from Haku'un Yasutani to teach Zen to Westerners.
- 1966: San Francisco Zen Center acquires Tassajara Zen Mountain Center
- 1966: Philip Kapleau establishes the Rochester Zen Center with the help of Chester Carlson (founder of Xerox), and Carlson's wife. Original Sangha consisted of 22 members.
- 1966: D.T. Suzuki dies on July 12 in Japan
- 1967: The Zen Center of Los Angeles is founded by Taizan Maezumi and his students
- 1967: Kobun Chino Otogawa arrives in San Francisco to assist Shunryu Suzuki
- 1967: Sojun Mel Weitsman and Shunryu Suzuki co-found the Berkeley Zen Center
- 1968: Samu Sunim founds the Zen Lotus Society in New York City (a.k.a. Buddhist Society for Compassionate Wisdom)
- 1968: New York zendō Shobo-Ji of the Zen Studies Society of New York City is officially inaugurated by Soen Nakagawa on his 7th trip to the USA
- 1969: Seikan Hasegawa, a Zen Buddhist priest from Japan, arrives in the United States
- 1969: Shunryu Suzuki gives Zentatsu Richard Baker Dharma transmission; begins transmission with Jakusho Kwong, but dies before completing process

=== 1970s ===
- 1970: Edward Espe Brown publishes the Tassajara Bread Book
- 1970: Shunryu Suzuki's book Zen Mind, Beginner's Mind is published by Weatherhill
- 1970: Shunryu Suzuki ordains Tenshin Reb Anderson
- 1970: Shasta Abbey is established in Mount Shasta, California by Jiyu Kennett
- 1970: James Ishmael Ford received Dharma transmission from Houn Jiyu Kennett 2 May 1971
- 1970: Santa Cruz Zen Center is founded by Kobun Chino Roshi.
- 1971 Shunryu Suzuki ordains Keido Les Kaye
- 1971: Shunryu Suzuki dies.
- 1971: Yamada Koun moves to Diamond Sangha in Hawaii to lead sesshin
- 1971: Kobun Chino Otogawa becomes abbot of Haiku Zen Center
- 1971: Kyozan Joshu Sasaki founds Mount Baldy Zen Center
- 1972: Seung Sahn arrives from Korea in Providence, Rhode Island and founds the Providence Zen Center
- 1972: Green Gulch Farm opens in Muir Beach, CA as part of the San Francisco Zen Center
- 1972 First meeting of the Zen Center of Syracuse founded by graduate students of Syracuse University
- 1972: Dainin Katagiri founds the Minnesota Zen Center
- 1972: Eido Tai Shimano receives Dharma transmission (Inka Shomei) from Soen Nakagawa at NY zendō
- 1973: Haku'un Yasutani dies
- 1973: Kyozan Joshu Sasaki founds Bodhi Manda Zen Center
- 1973: Jakusho Kwong founds the Sonoma Mountain Zen Center
- 1973: Seikan Hasegawa founds Rock Creek Buddhist Temple of America, Inc., in Derwood, Maryland
- 1973: The Cambridge Zen Center is founded as part of the Kwan Um School of Zen
- 1973: The New Haven Zen Center is founded as part of the Kwan Um School of Zen
- 1974: Robert Pirsig publishes Zen and the Art of Motorcycle Maintenance: An Inquiry into Values.
- 1974: Robert Baker Aitken receives teaching permission from Yamada Koun
- 1974: The Chicago Zen Center is founded by Philip Kapleau
- 1975?: Taizan Maezumi founds the White Plum Asanga
- 1975: The Chogye International Zen Center is founded by the Kwan Um School of Zen in New York City
- 1975: Seikan Hasegawa's book, The Cave of Poison Grass, Essays on the Hannya Sutra is published by Great Ocean Publishers
- 1976: Shohaku Okumura helps found Valley zendō in Charlemont, MA
- 1976: Dai Bosatsu zendō Kongo-Ji opens in the Catskill Mountains of New York State
- 1976: Tetsugen Bernard Glassman becomes Taizan Maezumi's first Dharma successor
- 1976: The City of Ten Thousand Buddhas is built, the first and still largest Chinese Chan community in the United States
- 1976: Heng Sure is ordained by Hsuan Hua, becomes one of the first Western Chinese Chan monks
- 1977: Kyogen Carlson receives Dharma transmission from Jiyu Kennett
- 1977: Seikan Hasegawa's book, Essays on Marriage is published by Great Ocean Publishers
- 1977?: The Atlanta Soto Zen Center is founded by Zenkai Michael Elliston
- 1978: The Buddhist Peace Fellowship is founded
- 1978: Charlotte Joko Beck receives Dharma transmission from Taizan Maezumi
- 1978: Genki Takabayashi becomes resident teacher at the Seattle Zen Center
- 1979: Maurine Stuart becomes President of the Cambridge Buddhist Association
- 1979: Omori Sogen of Tenryu-ji founds Daihonzan Chozen-ji in Honolulu, the first Rinzai Zen temple headquarters established outside Japan.

=== 1980s ===
- 1980: Chan master Sheng-yen begins teaching in the United States
- 1980: Dennis Genpo Merzel receives shiho (permission to teach) from Taizan Maezumi
- 1980: Hartford Street Zen Center is established
- 1980: Zen Mountain Monastery in founded in Mount Tremper, New York by Taizan Maezumi and John Daido Loori
- 1981: Toni Packer leaves Rochester Zen Center and founds her own non-Buddhist retreat
- 1981: Taizan Maezumi founds Yokoji Zen Mountain Center
- 1982: Maurine Stuart informally receives the title roshi from Soen Nakagawa in a private ceremony
- 1982: The Rinzai temple that would become Daiyuzenji is founded in Chicago, Illinois as a betsuin (branch) of Daihonzan Chozen-ji by Tenshin Tanouye and Fumio Toyoda.
- 1983: Jan Chozen Bays receives Dharma transmission from Taizan Maezumi
- 1983: The Kwan Um School of Zen is established by Seung Sahn Soen Sa Nim
- 1983: Dai Bai Zan Cho Bo Zen Ji is founded in Seattle, Washington by Genki Takabayashi
- 1983: Zentatsu Richard Baker confers Dharma transmission to Tenshin Reb Anderson
- 1983: Taizan Maezumi is confronted about his sexual relationships with some students and enters alcoholism treatment
- 1984: Zentatsu Richard Baker resigns as abbot of San Francisco Zen Center amidst controversy
- 1984: Katagiri Roshi, abbot of the Minnesota Zen Meditation Center, agrees to serve as interim abbot of the San Francisco Zen Center
- 1984: Soen Nakagawa dies at Ryutaku-Ji
- 1984: The New Orleans Zen Temple is founded by Robert Livingston in New Orleans, Louisiana
- 1984: Sojun Mel Weitsman receives Dharma transmission from Hoitsu Suzuki, son of Shunryu Suzuki
- 1985 Keido Les Kaye receives Dharma transmission from Hoitsu Suzuki
- 1985: Tenshin Reb Anderson succeeds Dainen Katagiri Roshi as abbot of San Francisco Zen Center
- 1985: Robert Baker Aitken receives Dharma transmission from Yamada Koun
- 1985: Tozen Akiyama founds the Milwaukee Zen Center, in Milwaukee, Wisconsin, and heads it until 2000.
- 1986: Bodhin Kjolhede is installed as abbot of Rochester Zen Center as Philip Kapleau retires
- 1986: Sojun Mel Weitsman joins Tenshin Reb Anderson as co-abbot of San Francisco Zen Center
- 1986: Furnace Mountain is founded in Clay City, Kentucky by Dae Gak and Seung Sahn as part of the Kwan Um School of Zen
- 1986: Toronto Zen Center is incorporated.
- 1986: Village zendō is established in New York City in the apartment of Pat Enkyo O'Hara
- 1987: Maitri Hospice begins caring for AIDS patients at the Hartford Street Zen Center (the first Buddhist hospice of its kind in the United States)
- 1987: Issho Fujita becomes abbot of Pioneer Valley zendō in Charlemont, Massachusetts
- 1988: Blanche Hartman receives Dharma transmission from Sojun Mel Weitsman
- 1988: Yamada Koun gives Dharma transmission to Ruben Habito
- 1988: Zoketsu Norman Fischer receives Dharma transmission from Sojun Mel Weitsman
- 1988 Keido Les Kaye invited to be abbot of Kannon Do in Mountain View, CA
- 1988: Hsi Lai Temple is built, the largest Chinese Chan community in Southern California, a Triple Platform Monastic Ordination is convened
- 1988: The Kwan Um School of Zen is rocked by revelations that Seung Sahn had sexual relationships with three students
- 1989: Issan Dorsey becomes abbot of Hartford Street Zen Center
- 1989?: The American Zen Teachers Association is founded
- 1989: Nonin Chowaney receives Dharma transmission from Dainin Katagiri
- 1989: Yamada Koun dies
- 1989: Danan Henry Roshi receives Dharma transmission from Philip Kapleau Roshi
- 1989: Zen Center of Denver founded with Danan Henry Roshi installed as abbot

=== 1990s ===
- 1990: Issan Dorsey dies of AIDS
- 1990: Maurine Stuart dies of cancer
- 1990: Gerry Shishin Wick receives Dharma transmission from Hakuyu Taizan Maezumi
- 1990: Joan Halifax receives "Lamp Transmission" from Thich Nhat Hanh
- 1990: Dainin Katagiri dies
- 1990: The Upaya Zen Center is founded by Joan Halifax in Santa Fe, New Mexico
- 1991: The Maria Kannon Zen Center is founded by Ruben Habito in Dallas, Texas
- 1991: Zenshin Philip Whalen becomes the new abbot of Hartford Street Zen Center
- 1991: The Mount Equity zendō is founded by Dai-En Bennage in Pennsdale, Pennsylvania
- 1992: Mary Farkas of the First Zen Institute of America dies
- 1992: Caitriona Reed receives teaching authorization from Thich Nhat Hanh
- 1992: George Bowman, Soeng Hyang, and Su Bong receive Dharma transmission from Seung Sahn
- 1992: Shi Yan Ming arrives in the United States
- 1993: Wu Bong, Wu Kwang, and Dae Gak receive Dharma transmission from Seung Sahn
- 1994: Charles Tenshin Fletcher receives Dharma transmission from Taizan Maezumi
- 1994: Su Bong dies during a retreat in Hong Kong
- 1994: Still Mind zendō founded by Janet Jiryu Abels and Father Robert Kennedy in New York City
- 1994: Enkyo Pat O'Hara receives shiho from Tetsugen Bernard Glassman
- 1994: Taigen Dan Leighton founds Mountain Source Sangha
- 1994: Shi Yan Ming founds the USA Shaolin Temple
- 1995: Taizan Maezumi dies May 15
- 1995: Charles Tenshin Fletcher appointed abbot of Yokoji Zen Mountain Center
- 1995: The Ordinary Mind School is founded by Charlotte Joko Beck
- 1995: Hsuan Hua dies June 7, age 77
- 1995: Taitaku Pat Phelan receives shiho from Sojun Mel Weitsman
- 1995: Anne Seisen Saunders receives shiho from Tetsugen Bernard Glassman
- 1995: Zoketsu Norman Fischer becomes abbot of San Francisco Zen Center, and serves until 2000
- 1995: Shodo Harada founds One Drop zendō on Whidbey Island in Washington state.
- 1996: Blanche Hartman becomes co-abbot of San Francisco Zen Center
- 1996 Les Kaye's book, Zen at Work, published by Three Rivers Press
- 1996: The Zen Peacemaker Order is founded by Bernard Glassman and his wife, Sandra Jishu Holmes.
- 1996: Jisho Warner receives dharma transmission from Tozen Akiyama and founds Stone Creek Zen Center in Sebastopol, California.
- 1996: The Sanshin Zen Community is founded by Shohaku Okumura in Bloomington, Indiana
- 1996: Jiyu Kennett dies November 6
- 1996: Jiko Linda Cutts receives Dharma transmission from Tenshin Reb Anderson
- 1996: The Hazy Moon Zen Center is founded by William Nyogen Yeo in Los Angeles, California
- 1996: Dae Kwang receives Dharma transmission from Seung Sahn
- 1996: Bonnie Myotai Treace receives Dharma transmission from John Daido Loori in the Mountains and Rivers Order
- 1996: Bernard Glassman confers Dharma Transmission to Dennis Genpo Merzel
- 1996: Dharma Drum Mountain Buddhist Association is established by Sheng-yen
- 1997: Dharma Drum Retreat Center is established in Pine Bush, New York by Sheng-yen and followers
- 1996: Ji Bong receives Dharma transmission from Seung Sahn
- 1997: Catholic priest Father Robert Kennedy receives inka from Bernard Glassman
- 1997: Soyu Matsuoka dies
- 1997: Geoffrey Shugen Arnold receives shiho from John Daido Loori
- 1998: Sherry Chayat, born in Brooklyn, became the first American woman to receive transmission in the Rinzai school of Buddhism. She received transmission from Eido Tai Shimano.
- 1998: Maylie Scott receives Dharma transmission from Sojun Mel Weitsman
- 1998: Hozan Alan Senauke receives Dharma transmission from Sojun Mel Weitsman
- 1999: Genjo Marinello founds Chobo-ji
- 1999: Joan Halifax receives Dharma transmission from Bernard Glassman
- 1999: John Tarrant establishes the Pacific Zen Institute
- 1999: Seikan Hasegawa's book Mind to Mind is published by Great Ocean Publishers
- 1999: Zen Center of Pittsburgh – Deep Spring Temple is founded by Nonin Chowaney in Pittsburgh, Pennsylvania

=== 2000—2009 ===
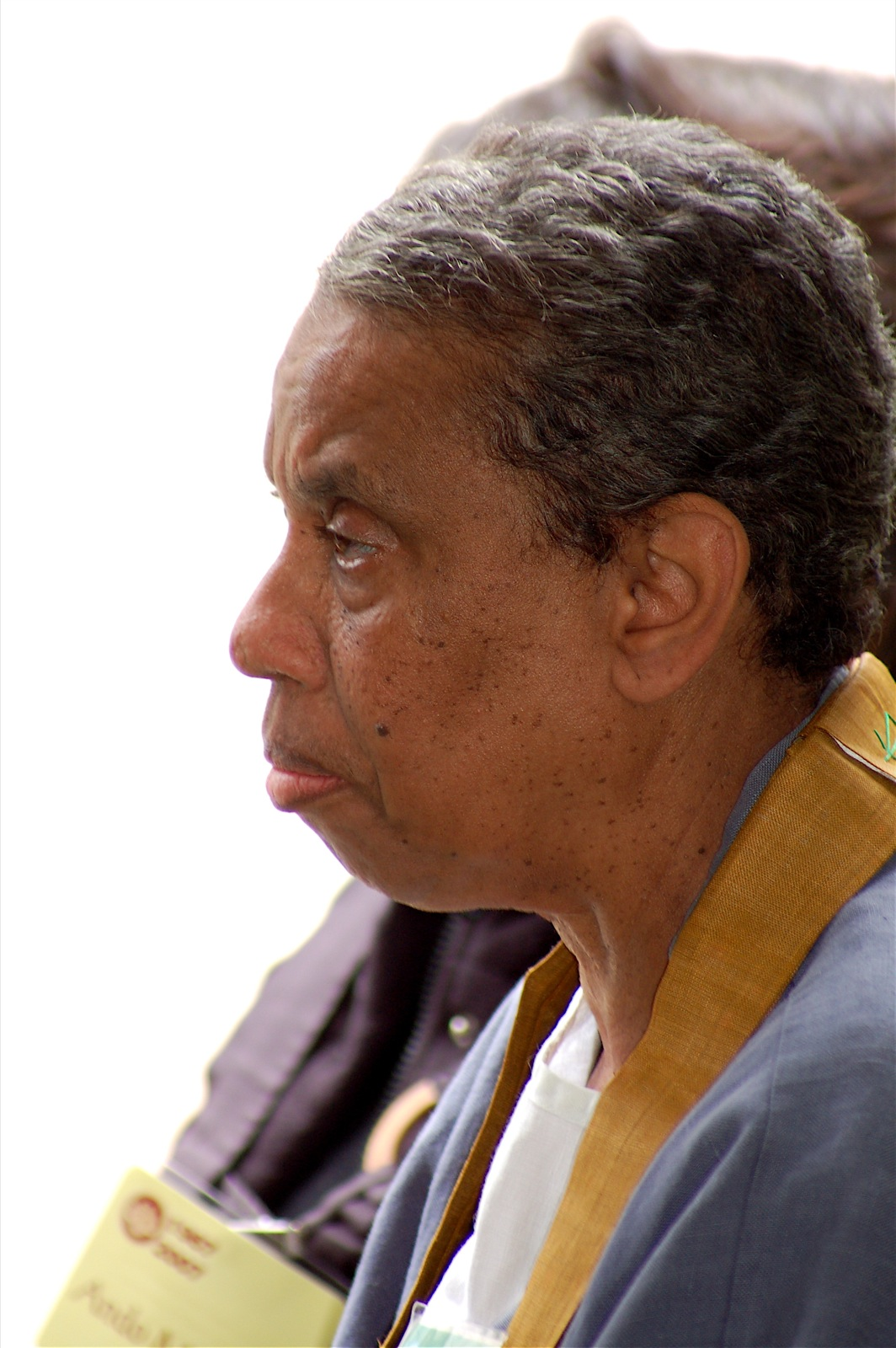
Merle Kodo Boyd became the first African-American woman to receive Dharma transmission in Zen Buddhism in 2006.

- 2000: Deer Park Monastery is founded in Escondido, California as part of Thich Nhat Hanh's Order of Interbeing
- 2000: Taigen Daniel Leighton receives Dharma transmission from Tenshin Reb Anderson.
- 2000: Bon Yeon receives Dharma transmission from Seung Sahn
- 2000: Sweetwater Zen Center established in National City, California
- 2001: Salt Spring Zen Circle established on Salt Spring Island, British Columbia
- 2001: Maylie Scott dies May 10, age 66
- 2002: Peter Schneider receives Dharma transmission from Sojun Mel Weitsman
- 2002: Zenshin Philip Whalen, abbot of Hartford Street Zen Center, dies on June 26
- 2002: Great Vow Zen Monastery founded by Jan Chozen Bays and Hogen Bays in Clatskanie, Oregon
- 2002: Kobun Chino Otogawa drowns in Switzerland
- 2002: Seirin Barbara Kohn becomes head priest and guiding teacher of Austin Zen Center in Austin, Texas
- 2002: Tim Burkett becomes Guiding Teacher of the Minnesota Zen Meditation Center
- 2003: Jy Din Shakya opens the Hsu Yun Temple in Honolulu before dying on March 13
- 2003: Paul Haller becomes abbot of San Francisco Zen Center
- 2003: Brad Warner publishes the book Hardcore Zen
- 2003: Daniel Doen Silberberg receives Dharma transmission from Dennis Genpo Merzel
- 2004: Philip Kapleau dies on May 6 from complications of Parkinson's disease
- 2004: Seung Sahn dies on November 30 in South Korea
- 2004: Soeng Hyang succeeds Seung Sahn as Guiding teacher of the Kwan Um School of Zen
- 2004: Angie Boissevain receives Dharma transmission from Vanja Palmers, a Dharma heir of Kobun Chino Otogawa
- 2004: Enkyo Pat O'Hara receives Dharma transmission from Tetsugen Bernard Glassman
- 2004: Golden Wind Zen Order is founded by Ji Bong in Long Beach, California
- 2005: Rinzai Daiyuzenji (formerly a branch temple of Daihonzan Chozen-ji in Hawaii) becomes independent
- 2005: Harvey Daiho Hilbert receives Dharma transmission from Hogaku Shozen McGuire and founds Order of Clear Mind Zen.
- 2006: Gerry Shishin Wick receives Dharma transmission from Bernard Glassman
- 2006: Merle Kodo Boyd becomes first African-American woman to receive Dharma transmission in Zen Buddhism, which she received from Wendy Egyoku Nakao.
- 2006: The Nashville Mindfulness Center is founded by Tiếp Hiện
- 2007: [[Salt Spring Zen Circle gives an official document honouring the women ancestors in the Zen tradition. The names of the women buddha ancestors were scrupulously researched and the Women Buddha Ancestor document, at the request of lay Zen teacher, Eihei Peter Levitt, was designed and created by Barbara Cooper. The document was bundled with the traditional male lineage and given at a jukai ceremony for the first time in history.]]
- 2007: Joko Dave Haselwood receives dharma transmission from Jisho Warner.
- 2007 Kannon Do completes construction and occupies larger center in Mountain View, CA
- 2007: Rochester Zen Center completes country zendō in Batavia New York called Chapin Mill Zen Retreat Center.
- 2007: New York Zen Center for Contemplative Care is founded by Robert Chodo Campbell and Koshin Paley Ellison in New York, NY.
- 2008: Roko Sherry Chayat is formally recognized as a "Zen master"
- 2008: Genjo Marinello receives Dharma transmission from Eido Tai Shimano
- 2008: Hsi Lai Temple celebrates 20th anniversary
- 2009: Sheng-yen dies on February 3 at age 80 in Taiwan
- 2009: Ancient Dragon Zen Gate is founded by Taigen Daniel Leighton in Chicago.
- 2009: John Daido Loori dies in New York at age 78 in Mount Tremper

=== 2010–Present ===
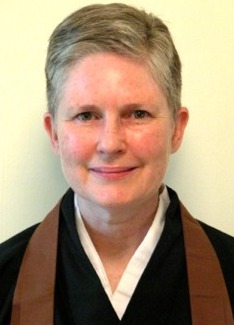
Taitaku Pat Phelan is a Sōtō Zen priest and current abbot of Chapel Hill Zen Center in Chapel Hill, North Carolina.

- 2010: Robert Aitken dies in Hawaii at age 93.
- 2010: Eko Little resigns as abbot of Shasta Abbey due to misconduct and subsequently disrobes
- 2010: Eido Shimano resigns from the board of the Zen Studies Society due to misconduct in July; retires as abbot of the Zen Studies Society in December
- 2010: The Soto Zen Buddhist Association (SZBA) approves a document honoring the women ancestors in the Zen tradition at its biannual meeting on October 8, 2010. Female ancestors, dating back 2,500 years from India, China, and Japan, may now be included in the curriculum, ritual, and training offered to Western Zen students.
- 2010: Karin Kempe, Ken Morgareidge, and Peggy Sheehan receive Dharma transmission and appointment of abbacy from Danan Henry Roshi who steps down as abbot of the Zen Center of Denver.
- 2010: The Lay Zen Teachers Association is founded as an association of Zen teachers who are formally authorized to teach Zen in their respective lineages
- 2011: Gyobutsuji Zen Monastery [(行仏寺 gyōbutsu-ji)], a Soto Zen monastery in the line of Shōhaku Okumura is dedicated near Kingston, Arkansas.
- 2011: Roko Sherry Chayat was installed as the second Abbot of Dai Bosatsu zendō Kongo-ji on New Year's Day.
- 2011: February, Dennis Genpo Merzel steps down as abbot of the Kanzeon Zen Center and resigns as elder of the White Plum Asanga due to sexual misconduct
- 2011: Joko Beck dies
- 2012: Helen Cortes, Lee Ann Nail and Maria Reis-Habito received Dharma Transmission from Ruben Habito of Maria Kannon Zen Center.
- 2012: Dana Kojun Hull receives Dharma Transmission from Jan Chozen Bays and Hogen Bays at Great Vow Zen Monastery
- 2012: Seikan Hasegawa's book Essays for Buddhist Trainees is published by Great Ocean Publishers
- 2013: Korinji [祖的山光林禅寺], a Rinzai Zen monastery in the line of Tekio Sogen Roshi, is dedicated near Madison, Wisconsin.
- 2014: Kyozan Joshu Sasaki dies in Los Angeles at age 107.
- 2014: Kyogen Carlson dies in Portland at age 65
- 2014: Blue Cliff Zen Center is established in Eugene, Oregon, a Rinzai Zen Center in the line of Shinzan Miyamae Roshi.
- 2015: Harvey Daiho Hilbert retires as abbot of the Order of Clear Mind Zen and becomes abbot emeritus.
- 2015: Kathryn Shukke Shin Hilbert is installed as abbot of the Order of Clear Mind Zen.
- 2015: Joshin Brian Byrnes becomes vice-abbot of Upaya Institute and Zen Center.
- 2016: Robert Livingston Roshi retires as abbot of New Orleans Zen Temple and becomes abbot emeritus. Richard Collins Roshi becomes abbot.
- 2016: Rafe Martin receives Dharma transmission from Danan Henry Roshi in a ceremony at the Rochester Zen Center.
- 2016: Rebecca Li receives Dharma transmission from Simon Child.
- 2016: Ron Hogen Green receives Dharma transmission from Geoffrey Shugen Arnold at Zen Mountain Monastery.
- 2017: Jody Hojin Kimmel receives Dharma transmission from Geoffrey Shugen Arnold at Zen Mountain Monastery.
- 2018: Vanessa Zuisei Goddard receives Dharma transmission from Geoffrey Shugen Arnold at Zen Mountain Monastery.
- 2018: Harvey Daiho Hilbert was re-instated as Abbot of the Order of Clear Mind Zen.
- 2018: Joshin Brian Byrnes founds and becomes guiding teacher of Bread Loaf Mountain Zen Community.

== See also ==
- List of American Buddhists
- List of Buddhists
