= Atlanta Soto Zen Center =

Sōtō Zen center in Atlanta, Georgia, USA

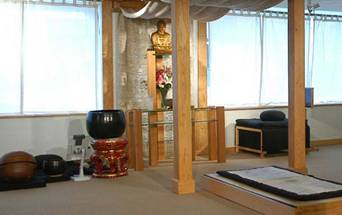

Religion
- Affiliation: Sōtō, Matsuoka line

Location
- Location: 1167 Zonolite Pl NE, Atlanta, GA 30306
- Country: United States
- Interactive map of Atlanta Soto Zen Center
- Coordinates: 33.805326°N 84.341545°W

Architecture
- Founder: Zenkai Taiun Michael Elliston
- Completed: 1977

Website
- https://www.aszc.org/

The Atlanta Soto Zen Center (ASZC) is a Soto Zen practice center founded in 1977 by Zenkai Taiun Michael Elliston-sensei, a dharma heir of the late Soyu Matsuoka and guiding teacher of the Mokurai Silent Thunder Order. Rev. Elliston has also received transmission in the Uchiyama lineage through Shohaku Okumura, roshi. The Atlanta Soto Zen Center is recognized by the Soto Zen Buddhist Association and serves as the main training center for the order which has affiliate centers throughout the United States and Canada.

== See also ==
- Buddhism in the United States
- Timeline of Zen Buddhism in the United States
