= William Nyogen Yeo =

- Title: Roshi

Personal life
- Born: 1936 United States
- Died: 2024 (aged 87–88) Los Angeles, California

Religious life
- Religion: Zen Buddhism
- School: Sōtō and Rinzai
- Lineage: White Plum Asanga
- Dharma name: Nyogen Yeo

Senior posting
- Predecessor: Taizan Maezumi

Military service
- Website: Hazy Moon Zen Center

William Nyogen Yeo was the spiritual director of Hazy Moon Zen Center in Los Angeles, California, one of the twelve Dharma Successors of the late Taizan Maezumi. He was a member of the American Zen Teachers Association.

== See also ==
- Timeline of Zen Buddhism in the United States
