= Dai Bai Zan Cho Bo Zen Ji =

Rinzai-style Zen temple in Seattle, Washington

Coordinates: 47.573968°N 122.309847°W

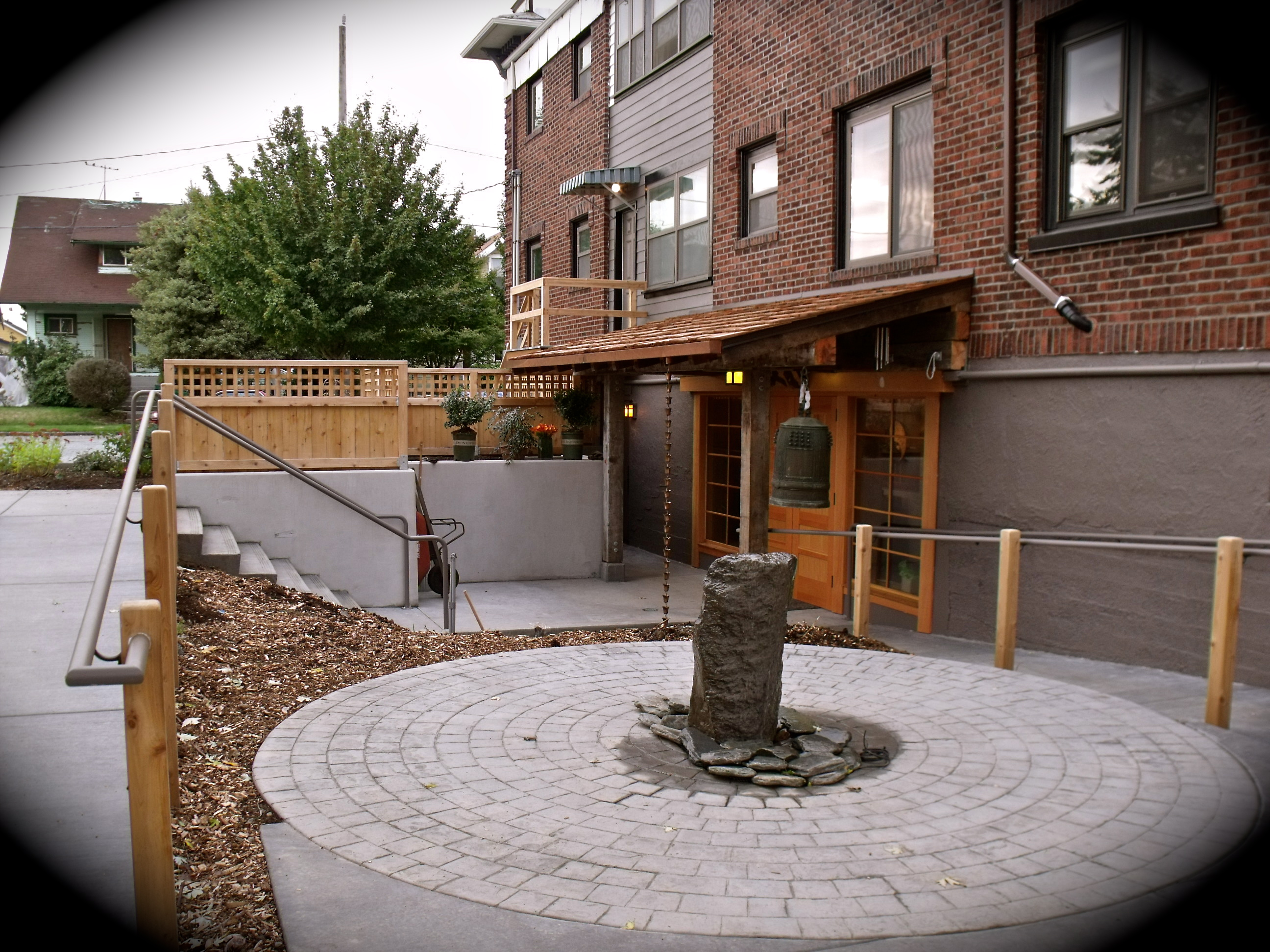

Religion
- Affiliation: Rinzai

Location
- Location: 1727 & 1733 S. Horton St., Seattle, WA 98144
- Country: United States
- Interactive map of Dai Bai Zan Cho Bo Zen Ji

Architecture
- Founder: Genki Takabayashi
- Completed: 1983

Website
- www.choboji.org/

Dai Bai Zan Cho Bo Zen Ji (Japanese: 大梅山 聴法禅寺) is a Rinzai-style Zen temple located on North Beacon Hill in Seattle, Washington. Its name translates from Japanese as "Listening to the Dharma Zen Temple on Great Plum Mountain."

== History, lineage, and teachers ==
Dai Bai Zan Cho Bo Zen Ji was founded by Zen Master Genki Takabayashi in 1983. Genjo Marinello Oshō succeeded Genki Rōshi in 1999 as the second abbot of Chobo-ji.

=== Genki Takabayashi ===
Genki Takabayashi Rōshi was invited by the Seattle Zen Center (founded by Dr. Glenn Webb, at the time a University of Washington Art History professor) to become the resident teacher in the fall of 1978. He accepted, and by 1983 founded Cho Bo Zen Ji. In Japan, he trained for nearly twenty years at Daitoku-ji, one of two parent Rinzai school temples. Takabayashi also directed a Rinzai temple in Kamakura. He became a monk at age 11. In 1997, Takabayashi retired and moved to Montana. Genki died on February 25, 2013, at his home in Montana, at the age of 81.

=== Genjo Marinello ===
Genjo Marinello Oshō began his Zen training in 1975 and was ordained as an unsui, or novice monk, in 1980. From 1981-1982 he trained at Ryutaku-ji in Japan with Sochu Rōshi and Soen Nakagawa Rōshi. Marinello later continued his training with Eido Shimano Rōshi, abbot of Dai Bosatsu Monastery. On May 21, 2008, Marinello received dharma transmission from Eido Shimano Rōshi, in a ceremony also involving his former teacher Takabayashi.

Marinello is a licensed psychotherapist, a member of the interfaith organization Spiritual Directors International), and of the American Zen Teachers Association.

Marinello has served as an adjunct faculty member of Antioch University Seattle. He has volunteered as a Buddhist pastor for the Washington State Department of Corrections, been a meditation instructor for Birankai International (Aikido association) and has worked with the Seattle Church Council as part of an interfaith trauma response team).

Several of Marinello's Dharma Talks have been published, including in the Theosophical Society's Quest Magazine, Sansho Journal and the journal of the Zen Studies Society. Genjo Oshō's commentary on Zen Koan Practice has been translated into several languages.

== Activities ==
- weekly Introductions to Zen
- daily Zazen
- bimonthly Sunday Dharma Talks
- quarterly week-long sesshins
- monthly half-day sesshins
- Prison Dharma Work

== See also ==
- Zen
- Rinzai school
- Buddhism in the United States
- Timeline of Zen Buddhism in the United States
- History of the Japanese in Seattle
- Index of Buddhism-related articles
