= Chapel Hill Zen Center =

Buddhist center in North Carolina, US

- Location within North Carolina

Religion
- Affiliation: Buddhist
- Sect: Sōtō Zen
- Leadership: Abbess Josho Pat Phelan
- Status: Active

Location
- Location: 5322 NC Highway 86, Chapel Hill, North Carolina 27599 United States
- Country: United States
- Coordinates: 36.0036011°N 79.0653860°W

Architecture
- Established: 1981

Website
- chzc.org

The Chapel Hill Zen Center (also called the Red Cedar Mountain Temple) is a Sōtō Zen Buddhist center in Chapel Hill, North Carolina founded in 1981. The center has been led by Josho Pat Phelan since 1991, who officially became abbess of the center in 2000.

The Chapel Hill Zen Center is associated with the San Francisco Zen Center and is a member of the Soto Zen Buddhist Association.

== History ==
The zen center formed in 1981 as the Chapel Hill Zen Group. The group was initially formed by former residents of the San Francisco Zen Center who had moved to North Carolina. After growing in membership the organization changed its name to the Chapel Hill Zen Center in 1997.

== Events ==
Chapel Hill Zen Center hosts Zen classes and beginner's meditation workshops and has hosted Zen teachers such as Sojin Roshi Mel Weitsman, Zoketsu Norman Fischer, and Japanese calligrapher and author Kazuaki Tanahashi.

The center holds children's classes and has held classes on sewing traditional Buddhist robes called rakusu and holds celebrations for Buddha's Birthday, also called Hanamatsuri or "Flower Festival" in Japanese.
