= Sasaki Gensō =

Sasaki Gensō Rōshi
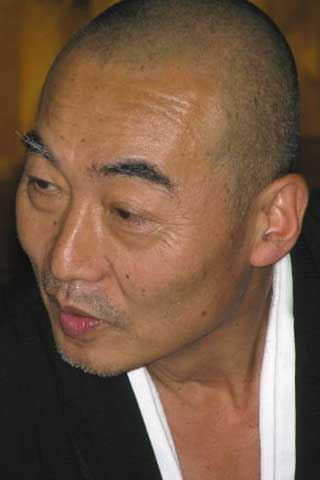
- Title: Rōshi

Personal life
- Born: 1947 (age 78–79) Japan

Religious life
- Religion: Zen Buddhism
- School: Rinzai
- Lineage: Tenryū-ji

Senior posting
- Based in: Ryū-Un Zendō, Tokyo
- Predecessor: Ōmori Sōgen

Military service
- Website: http://www.ryu-un-zendo.org

Sasaki Gensō (佐々木 玄宗; born 1947) is a Japanese Rinzai Rōshi, a successor in the Tenryū-ji line of Rinzai Zen, a teacher of Jikishinkage-ryū swordsmanship, and a calligrapher.

Sasaki Roshi founded the Ryu-Un-Zendo in Tokyo in 1984 and since 1992 he has been teaching at the Asahi Cultural Centre, also located in Tokyo.
