= Fumio Toyoda =

Japanese aikidoka (1947–2001)

Tenzan (Fumio) Toyoda, taken at Chozen-ji temple, Hawaii

Calligraphy by Fumio Toyoda: Ikkyoku shūchū, Takyoku bunsan ("Concentrate on a single point, spread out to many points"). This phrase was a personal motto.

Fumio Toyoda (November 8, 1947 – July 4, 2001) was a Japanese aikido teacher and lay Zen master who taught extensively in the United States and Europe. He is one of few teachers to explicitly teach aikido from the perspective of Zen Buddhism.

Raised in Tochigi Prefecture in Japan, Toyoda began training at age 10 with his first teacher Koichi Tohei, whose family land neighbored that of the Toyoda family. Toyoda was awarded the rank of shodan at age 17, during a test administered by the late Morihiro Saito. At age 17, he also began training in the misogi methods taught at the Ichikukai Dojo in Tokyo. Toyoda would go on to live for three years at Ichikukai as a resident student, or jyoju. It was here that he began studying Zen as well.

Toyoda later enrolled as uchideshi at Aikikai Hombu Dojo in Tokyo, and lived there for over two years. In 1974, when Koichi Tohei split off from the Aikikai Foundation to eventually form his Ki no Kenkyukai, Toyoda followed. In that same year - now 27 years old and holding the rank of godan - he was sent by Tohei to study Zen. Tohei would eventually promote him to the rank of rokudan (6th degree). Disagreements between the two, however, led to Toyoda's departure from Tohei's organization. In 1984, with the assistance of Jon Takagi, Toyoda founded his own Chicago-based organization, the Aikido Association of America. Now independent, Toyoda traveled extensively leading seminars. His network of European students formed a sister organization, the Aikido Association International (AAI). AAA/AAI would eventually re-affiliate with Aikikai Hombu Dojo in 1994.

In 1997, Toyoda was given inka shomei, the certification of completion of his training in Rinzai Zen, by the late Tenshin Tanouye Roshi of Chozen-ji temple in Honolulu, Hawaii; the dharma name awarded was "Tenzan Gensei". Toyoda was active promoting Zen training in his network of aikido dojo. For many years in Chicago he headed a betsuin (branch temple) of Chozen-ji, as well as International Zen Dojo Sogenkai, a lay Zen organization he founded to promulgate the teachings of the late Zen master, swordsman and calligrapher Omori Sogen. He also founded the Japanese Culture Center (located in one of Chicago's central neighborhoods), where students learn an array of martial arts, including Aikido, Kendo, Shuri-Ryu karate, as well as take classes in Zen and meditation / internal training.

On July 4, 2001 Toyoda succumbed to a bacterial infection, dying suddenly at the age of 53. His posthumous Buddhist name is "Tenzan Gensho Rokoji".

AAA and AAI continue to be active today, as affiliates of Aikikai Hombu Dojo in Japan under the guidance of Yasuo Kobayashi. Several other martial art organizations and schools, founded by Toyoda's senior students after his death, are also active. The Zen organizations Toyoda helped build eventually coalesced to form Daiyuzenji, a Rinzai Zen temple still active in Chicago.

Fumio Toyoda Shihan is succeeded by his son Stephen Toyoda, who is the current president of the Aikido Association of America and Aikido Association International.

== Bibliography ==
- Pranin, Stanley A. (1991). The Aiki News Encyclopedia of Aikido. Tokyo, Japan: Aiki News. p. 125. ISBN 4-900586-12-9.
- Taylor, Eugene (2012). Seth Robert Segall (ed.). Encountering Buddhism: Western Psychology and Buddhist Teachings. SUNY Press. p. 186. ISBN 978-0-7914-8679-5.
- Binder, Mark (1996). "Interview with Fumio Toyoda". Aikido Journal #108. Aikido Journal. Archived from the original on 2014-02-03.
- Active Interest Media, Inc. (January 2000). Black Belt. Active Interest Media, Inc. p. 51. ISSN 0277-3066.
