= Daiyuzenji =

Rinzai Zen Buddhist temple in Chicago, Illinois

Coordinates: 41.949185°N 87.673574°W

Sokeizan Daiyuzenji

Religion
- Affiliation: Rinzai

Location
- Location: 3717 N. Ravenswood #112, Chicago, IL 60613
- Country: United States
- Interactive map of Sokeizan Daiyuzenji

Architecture
- Founder: Tenshin Tanouye, Fumio Toyoda, Dogen Hosokawa

Website
- www.daiyuzenji.org

Daiyuzenji is a Rinzai Zen Buddhist temple located on the North Side of Chicago, Illinois, in the United States.

Daiyuzenji began in 1982 as the Illinois betsuin (branch temple) of Daihonzan Chozen-ji, a Rinzai Zen headquarters temple founded in 1979 in Honolulu, Hawaii by Omori Sogen Roshi (1904–1994), a successor in the Tenryu-ji line of Rinzai Zen. Fumio Toyoda, a lay Zen master and martial arts teacher who had emigrated to Chicago from Japan in 1974, was the driving force behind the founding and administration of the betsuin. Tenshin Tanouye Roshi and Dogen Hosokawa Roshi, two of Omori Roshi's successors who taught at Chozen-ji, traveled to Chicago beginning in the early 1980s to lead sesshin there.

Eventually the Chicago betsuin developed a cadre of senior students, including several ordained priests. In 2005 it was designated a fully independent temple by Hosokawa Roshi, named Sokeizan Daiyuzenji (曹渓山大雄禅寺). So'zan Miller Roshi, one of Hosokawa Roshi's dharma heirs, was appointed the first Daiyuzenji shike (abbot). The current abbot "shike" of Daiyzenji is Tesshin Brand Roshi, dharma heir to So'zan Miller Roshi.

Daiyuzenji teachers and community members were involved with the establishment of Korinji, a new Rinzai Zen Buddhist sodo (monastery) in the Madison, Wisconsin area. Groundbreaking for this occurred in June, 2009. Daiyuzenji and Korinji together anchor a network of associated Zen practice groups called the Rinzai Zen Community (RZC).

== Activities ==
- Zazen (meditation) and okyo (chanting)
- Koan training
- Short and long sesshin
- Shorter retreats (zazenkai) and seminars
- Buddhist studies group
- Weekly introductions to Zen practice for beginners
- Related cultural and fine arts

== See also ==
- Zen
- Rinzai school
- Buddhism in the United States
- Timeline of Zen Buddhism in the United States
