= PZI =

PZI may refer to:

- Pacific Zen Institute, a Zen Buddhist practice center in Santa Rosa, California
- PZI, the IATA code for Panzhihua Bao'anying Airport, Sichuan Province, China
