= Danan Henry =

- Title: Roshi

Personal life
- Born: 1939 (age 86–87)
- Education: University of California, Berkeley

Religious life
- Religion: Zen Buddhism
- Lineage: Harada-Yasutani

Senior posting
- Based in: Zen Center of Denver (formerly)
- Predecessor: Philip Kapleau; Robert Baker Aitken
- Successor: Karin Ryuku Kempe, Peggy Metta Sheehan, Ken Tetsuzan Morgareidge, Rafe Jnan Martin, Hoag Holmgren
- Website: www.zencenterofdenver.org/

Michael Danan Henry (born 1939) is an American Roshi in the Harada-Yasutani school of Zen Buddhism, a sect derived from both the Rinzai and Sōtō traditions of Japanese Zen, practicing in the Diamond Sangha tradition of Robert Baker Aitken. The founding teacher of the Zen Center of Denver, Henry received Dharma transmission from Philip Kapleau Roshi in 1989 and, after many years of subsequent training with Robert Aitken Roshi, was recognized as a Diamond Sangha master by Aitken. Danan Henry Roshi created and implemented the Monastery Without Walls training program; the Lotus in the Flame Lay Order; and the Every Minute Zen mindfulness training program as abbot and spiritual director of the Zen Center of Denver.

On September 12, 2010, Danan Roshi conferred Dharma transmission and appointment of abbacy to Karin Kempe, Ken Morgareidge, and Peggy Sheehan, and stepped aside as abbot of the Zen Center of Denver. Danan Roshi has lived at the Bodhi Manda Zen Center in Jemez Springs, NM since 2021 and is the teacher of the Old Bones Sangha, a small group of mostly senior students who meet periodically in person for retreats.

On June 30, 2016, Danan Roshi conferred Dharma transmission to Rafe Martin in a public ceremony at the Rochester Zen Center.

On June 18, 2023, Danan Roshi conferred Dharma transmission to Hoag Holmgren in a public ceremony at the Bodhi Manda Zen Center.

On June 24, 2023, Danan Roshi identified the following as associate teachers: John Guernsey, David Harris, Steve Hughes, and James Marshall.

On February 5, 2026, Danan Roshi identified Paul Gordon as an associate teacher.

== See also ==
- Buddhism in the United States
- Timeline of Zen Buddhism in the United States
