= Hazy Moon Zen Center =

Zen school in Los Angeles, California, United States

Coordinates: 34°2′31″N 118°18′47″W

The Hazy Moon Zen Center is a Soto Zen center in Los Angeles, California.

== History ==
Hazy Moon Zen Center was founded in 1996 by William Nyogen Yeo Roshi through the honorary founder Taizan Maezumi Roshi. Nyogen Roshi practiced 27 years with Maezumi Roshi and was the last of the successors in the Maezumi Roshi Lineage.

As an active Zen temple, the Hazy Moon offers daily zazen practice that allows the public to practice with the temple monks, and Dharma talks are given by Nyogen Roshi on a weekly basis. As with most Zen temples, intensive retreats (sesshin) and regular classes that aid practitioners in strengthening their Zen practice are offered throughout the year.

== See also ==
- Timeline of Zen Buddhism in the United States
