= Josho Pat Phelan =

American Buddhist priest

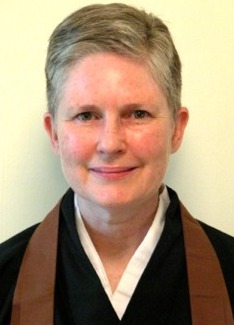
- Title: Priest
- Other name: Taitaku Josho

Religious life
- Religion: Buddhism
- Denomination: Sōtō

Senior posting
- Based in: Chapel Hill Zen Center
- Website: http://www.chzc.org

Josho Pat Phelan, Buddhist name Taitaku Josho, is a Sōtō Zen priest and current abbot of Chapel Hill Zen Center in Chapel Hill, North Carolina — she has served as abbot there since 2000. Before coming to Chapel Hill, she practiced for twenty years at Tassajara Zen Mountain Center and the San Francisco Zen Center (where she became practice leader and director). Phelan began leading the Chapel Hill Zen Center in 1991, when there were just eight members including herself. As of 2001, the center had forty-five members and provided meditation instruction for approximately one-hundred and fifty people every year. Ordained as a priest by Zentatsu Richard Baker in 1977, she began Zen practice in 1969 and has also trained under Sojun Mel Weitsman, Robert Baker Aitken and Tenshin Reb Anderson. Additionally, Phelan is a member of the American Zen Teachers Association, and in 1995 she received shiho from Sojun Weitsman at Tassajara.

== See also ==
- Buddhism in the United States
- Timeline of Zen Buddhism in the United States
