= Korinji =

Buddhist monastery

Coordinates: 43°37′47″N 90°00′38″W

So'tekizan Korinji
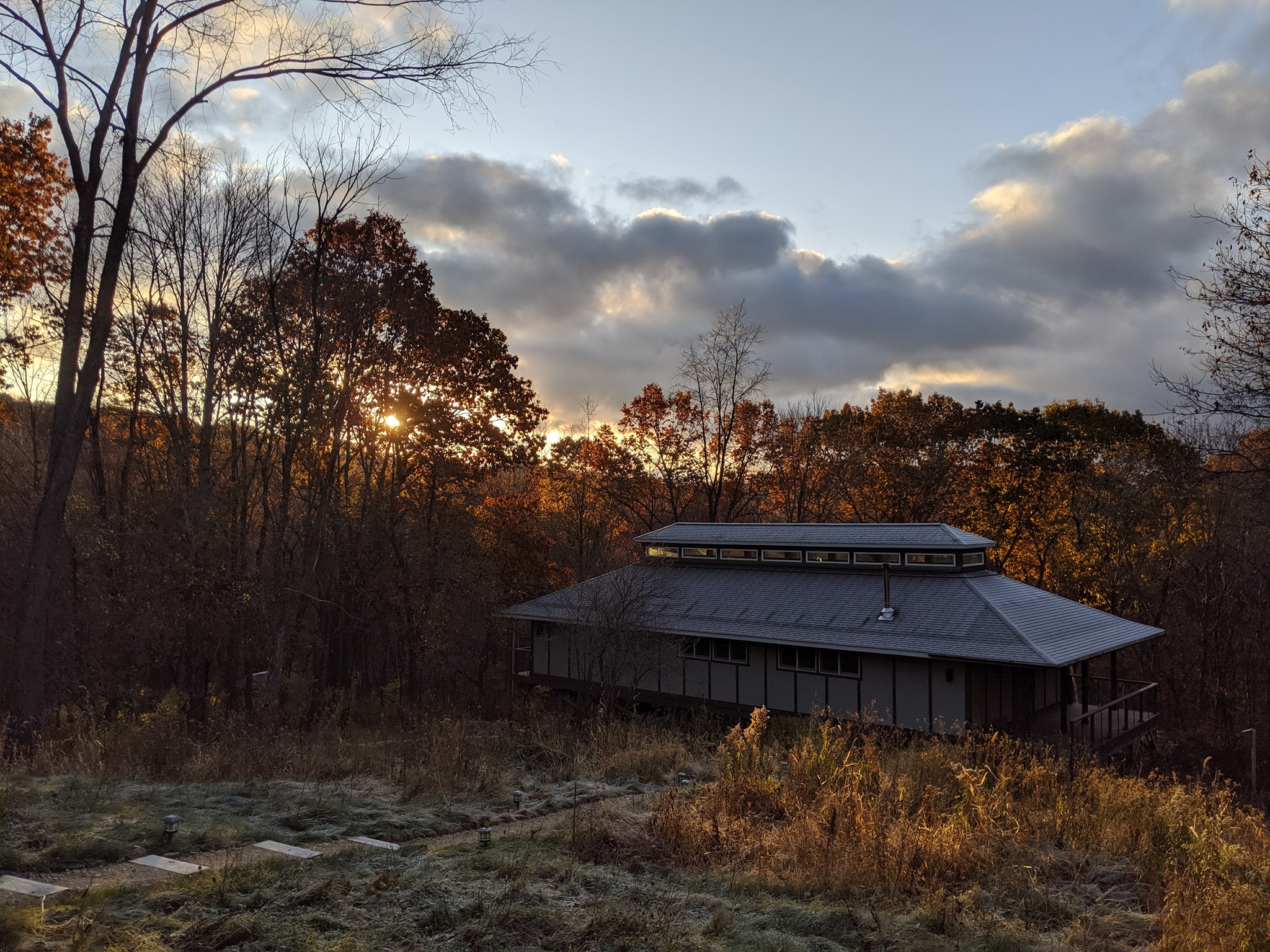
- Zendō of Korinji in autumn.

Religion
- Affiliation: Rinzai

Location
- Location: Near Reedsburg, WI
- Country: United States
- Interactive map of So'tekizan Korinji

Website
- http://www.korinji.org

So'tekizan Korinji (祖的山光林寺), or simply Korinji, is a Rinzai Zen Buddhist monastery (sodo) near Reedsburg, Wisconsin, United States. It opened in 2017. It is additionally a center for mikkyo, Shugendo, and budo practice, and houses the Korinji Center for the Contemplative Arts, offering training in tea ceremony, bonji calligraphy, and ceramics.

== Background ==
The Korinji Foundation, a not-for-profit charitable organization, was founded in 2005 to fund Korinji's construction and to support its future residents. 17 acres (69,000 m^{2}) of forested land were purchased by the Foundation for this purpose in 2008. Groundbreaking occurred in June, 2009 and Korinji was officially dedicated on November 3, 2013, with the completion of its training hall.

Meido Moore Roshi, a student of the Rinzai Zen teachers Tenzan Toyoda Rokoji, Dogen Hosokawa Roshi, and So'zan Miller Roshi, was installed as the first abbot; these teachers all carry the lineage of Omori Sogen Roshi, a well-known Japanese Zen master who was a successor of the Tenryu-ji line of Zen. In 2017 Korinji's residential quarters were completed and the first period of formal monastic training began shortly after.

== Network ==
Korinji serves as the headquarters monastery and spiritual center for Rinzai Zen International, a worldwide association of affiliated Zen practice groups, with nearby Ryugenji temple in Madison, Wisconsin being its primary branch.

== See also ==
- Buddhism in the United States
- Glossary of Japanese Buddhism
- Timeline of Zen Buddhism in the United States
