= Ichikukai Dōjō =

Zen training location

The Ichikukai Dōjō (一九会道場) is a place for training in Misogi-no-kokyu-ho (a Shinto purification through breathing practice) and Zen meditation. The Misogi practiced at the Ichikukai traces its roots to Inoue Masagane.

The dōjō was founded in 1922 by members of the Tokyo University Rowing Team along with Ogura Tetsuju, the last disciple of swordsman and calligrapher Yamaoka Tesshu. The Ichikukai has a reputation for severity. A number of well-known martial artists (esp. aikido) have trained there.
