= Sōyū Matsuoka =

Soyu Matsuoka
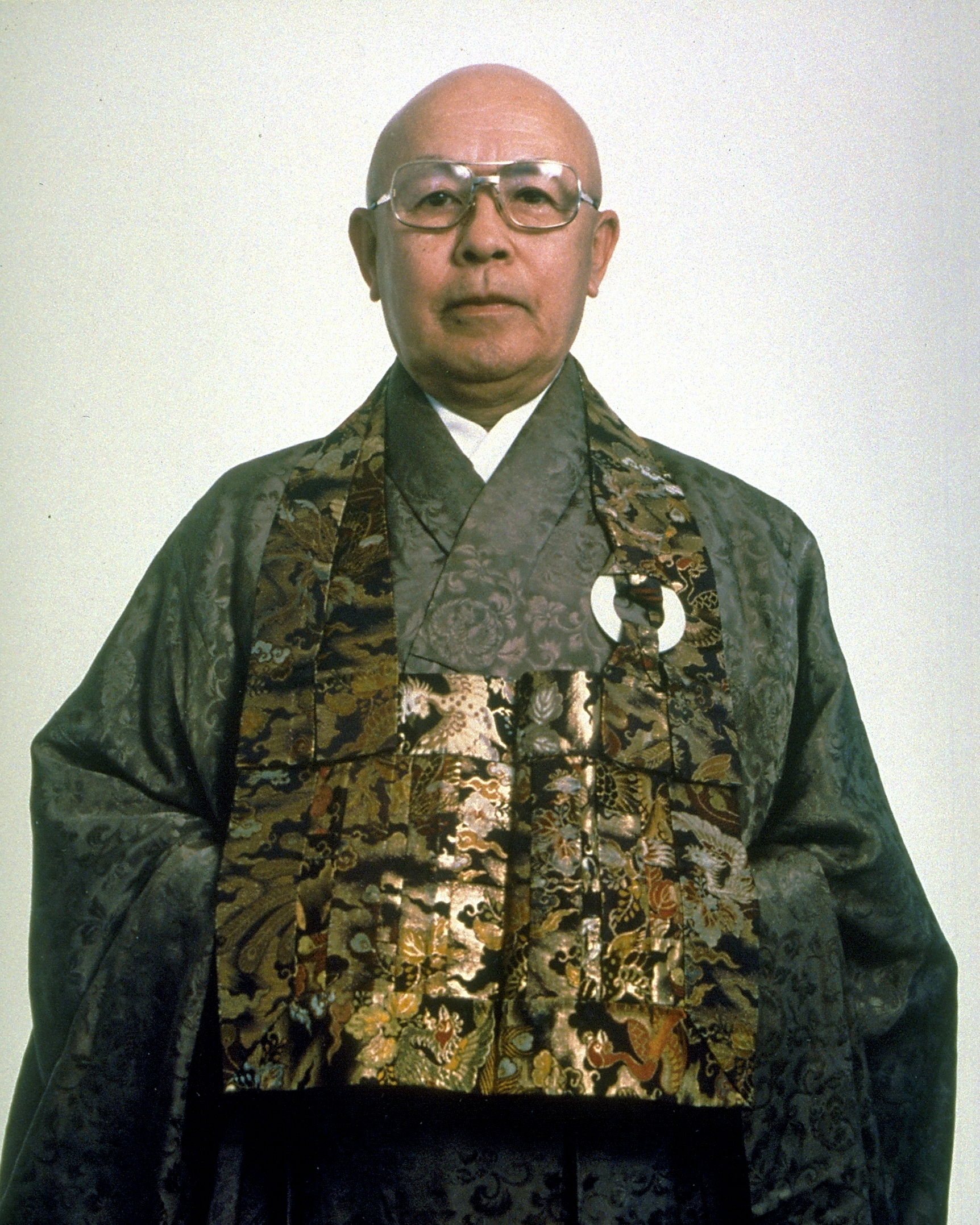

Personal life
- Born: 1912 Hiroshima, Japan
- Died: 1997 (aged 84–85)
- Education: Komazawa University
- Website: http://www.azszc.org/dedication.htm

Religious life
- Religion: Zen Buddhism
- School: Sōtō

Senior posting
- Successor: Richard Langlois, Zenkai Taiun Michael Elliston (East Coast), Hogaku Shozen McGuire (West Coast)

Dr. Soyu Matsuoka (松岡 操雄, 1912–1997), along with Sokei-an and Nyogen Senzaki, was one of the early Zen teachers to make the United States his home.

== Biography ==
Shortly before World War II Matsuoka went to the US, to serve Japanese immigrants. He arrived to be the assistant to the abbot of Zenshuji Temple in Los Angeles, and was later the supervisor at Sokoji Soto Zen Mission (Temple) in San Francisco.

Matsuoka established the Chicago Buddhist Temple in 1949 (now the Zen Buddhist Temple of Chicago). In the 1960s he gathered a following of Americans. Richard Langlois was one of the first Americans ever to receive Dharma transmission. In 1970 Matsuoka left Chicago and moved to Long Beach, California, where he continued to preside over other communities. Matsuoka left the Soto-shu, Matsuoka holding that Zen is a personal experience, and that the authority of the Soto Sect and its training monasteries (専門僧堂) inhibit the practice of Zen.

Matsuoka died in 1997.

== Dharma heirs ==
According to Kozen Sampson, at least three of Matsuoka's students received inka shomei. These three "were considered to be fully transmitted priests with the status of Roshi by him". Four students were registered with the Soto-Shu as "initial novice priest", and to five students was conferred "full priesthood".

Three Dharma Heirs of Soyu Matsuoka were:

- Hogaku Shozen McGuire,
- Zenkai Taiun Michael Elliston,
- Kaiten Johndennis Govert,

Hogaku established Daibutsuji Zen Temple in Cloudcroft and the Zen Center of Las Cruces, in Las Cruces, New Mexico. So Gozen is now the Abbot of Daibutsuji and the Zen Center of Las Cruces. Daiho Hilbert left Daibutsuji to establish the Order of Clear Mind Zen, a socially engaged sangha in New Mexico. Taiun Elliston Sensei established the Atlanta Soto Zen Center and is working to establish an order honoring Matsuoka.
