= Nyogen Senzaki =

Japanese-American Zen monk (1876–1958)

- Title: Zen Master

Personal life
- Born: 1876 Japan
- Died: May 7, 1958 (aged 81–82)

Religious life
- Religion: Buddhism
- School: Rinzai

Nyogen Senzaki (千崎 如幻, 1876–1958) was a Rinzai Zen monk who was one of the 20th century's leading proponents of Zen Buddhism in the United States.

== Early life ==
Details of Senzaki's early life are unclear. Town records in Fukaura, Aomori state Senzaki was born on October 5, 1876, as the Senzaki family's first son. He was named Aizo Senzaki. As a youth, Senzaki's grandmother told him he had been abandoned as an infant and was discovered by a fisherman from Sakhalin island, Siberia who reportedly brought him back to Aomori Prefecture.

His father is unknown, but he was either Russian or Chinese. Aizo's grandmother was perhaps misinformed in her version of events, because some accounts state young Senzaki was adopted by a travelling Kegon Buddhist priest and brought back to Japan.

== Early training ==
When Senzaki was five years old his mother died. He was sent to a Pure Land temple run by his grandfather, with whom he began the study of many Chinese classics. The elderly priest had a profound influence on him, which was, as Nyogen Senzaki later wrote, "to live up to the Buddhist ideals outside of name and fame and to avoid as far as possible the world of loss and gain". When Senzaki was 16 his grandfather died, stating to Aizo just before dying:

Even though you have told me that you want to become a monk, when I look at the way Buddhism is now in Japan, I am afraid you may regret it. So think it over.

When his grandfather died Senzaki left his grandfather's temple and enrolled in a school to prepare for medical school. According to his own account, he read the autobiography of Benjamin Franklin while in school and tried to imitate Franklin's approach toward spirituality. He felt himself drawn a bit to Christianity, during this period, but ended up meeting a haiku poet who taught him about Matsuo Bashō. By the age of 18 he had read the entirety of the Tripitaka. During this period he read about how Tokusan had burned a volume of Diamond Sutra commentaries he himself was currently studying. This was Aizo's turning point, and he decided to become a Zen Buddhist monk.

On April 8, 1895 (on Vesak), when Aizo was 19, he was ordained as a monk and was given the Dharma name Nyogen at a Soto Zen temple. The word Nyogen means "Like a dream, like a fantasy" in Japanese and came from the concluding verse of Diamond Sutra. Nyogen says he would have preferred to be ordained at a Rinzai temple, but there was none in his area. The next year Nyogen went to Engaku-ji in Kamakura where he studied Zen under Rinzai master Soyen Shaku. Soyen was a strict teacher who was very harsh and physical in his training methods. During this time Nyogen contracted tuberculosis and lived in virtual confinement in a small hut on the grounds of the monastery. The next year, on the verge of death, somehow his condition managed to improve and he was able to go back to the monastery.

Here Nyogen came to meet another 20th-century pioneer of Zen, D. T. Suzuki. Suzuki was a lay student of Soyen Shaku. Nyogen was becoming disconcerted with the institutional practices of the monastery at the time, and turned to books as a means of release. Here he came across the works of Friedrich Fröbel, the founder of kindergarten. In 1901, Nyogen asked Soyen if he could leave the monastery to open a kindergarten. He called it Mentorgarten, a place free of religiosity and ritual where children could be children.

== America ==
In 1905 Soyen Shaku was asked by friends in the San Francisco, CA area to come and give talks and lectures on Buddhism. Soyen needed an attendant for his time there, and asked Nyogen to come with him. Nyogen jumped at the opportunity, for he was dissatisfied with Japanese politics and the institutional way in which Zen was then being practiced. So they left that same year and landed in Seattle, WA where they stayed for a few days, and then headed for San Francisco. When it was time for the two to return to Japan, Soyen sensed his student's turmoil at the prospect of returning.

In Golden Gate Park, Soyen Shaku set down his friend Nyogen's suitcase and said the following to him:

Just face the great city and see whether it conquers you or you conquer it. Do not feel obliged to serve me any longer.

With those words Shaku spun about and left Nyogen there, and the two would never meet face to face again. Nyogen stayed in the USA for the rest of his life, with the exception of a trip in 1955 back to Japan to visit his friend Soen Nakagawa. In the San Francisco area Nyogen performed jobs as a hotel clerk and elevator assistant (among other jobs) to get by. He certainly was struggling with his finances. During his spare time Nyogen would visit the San Francisco Public Library often and read books on Immanuel Kant, Ralph Waldo Emerson and William James. He was studying English and developed a good grasp of the language.

== Floating Zendo ==
In 1919 Nyogen received word that Shaku had died back in Japan. Still in San Francisco, around this time he compiled the famous book 101 Zen Stories. In 1922 Nyogen managed to gather enough money to rent a hall and lecture on Zen. He continued lecturing, moving from place to place and teaching about Zen meditation. By 1927 he had developed a small following with his "Floating Zendo". His only material whilst going from hall to hall was a picture of Manjusri Bodhisattva. Eventually, along with the help of some students, he managed to rent an apartment in San Francisco where he would hold practice. During this period he had a guest speaker, Gyudo Furukawa, come from Japan to lecture.

Nyogen moved to Los Angeles in the 1930s, where he again rented out an apartment and continued the so-called "Floating Zendo" model. Soon Senzaki became familiar with the community of Japanese immigrants there. In 1932 he befriended a Japanese woman named Kin Tanahashi, who had a developmentally disabled boy. Nyogen cared for the boy in exchange for room and board. It was Tanahashi who introduced Nyogen to the haiku poetry of Soen Nakagawa, an unconventional young monk practicing in Japan, who would go on to become one of the most prominent Rinzai Zen teachers to come West. Senzaki was very impressed by these poems, so he contacted Soen and they began corresponding with one another.

Following the attack on Pearl Harbor and the signing of Executive Order 9066, Senzaki was among the tens of thousands of Japanese-Americans to be relocated to internment camps. He spent the duration of World War II in a relocation center in Heart Mountain, Wyoming.

At the conclusion of the war, Senzaki moved what he called his "Floating Zendo" to Los Angeles. While making his living in a number of ways he devoted the rest of his life to teaching Zen. Among his students at this time were Robert Aitken, who would become one of the most significant of modern Western Zen teachers, and Samuel L. Lewis who would later be known as a prominent Sufi teacher in the line of Inayat Khan and a Zen teacher in the lineage of Korean Seon Master Kyung-Bo Seo. Senzaki also maintained his long-term correspondence with Soen Nakagawa.

Senzaki died on May 7, 1958, at 81 years old. There are several versions of his "last words," one of the most compelling of which is "Remember the Dharma! Remember the Dharma! Remember the Dharma!"

== Students ==
- Samuel L. Lewis
- Robert Aitken Roshi
- Henry Seisen Mittwer
- Jay DuPont Roshi

== Selected works (in English) ==
- Buddhism and Zen (with Ruth Strout McCandless) ISBN 0-86547-315-3.
- The Iron Flute (with Ruth Strout McCandless) ISBN 0-8048-3248-X.
- Zen Flesh, Zen Bones: A collection of Zen and Pre-Zen Writings (with Paul Reps) ISBN 0-385-08130-8.
- Eloquent Silence: Nyogen Senzaki's Gateless Gate (with Roko Sherry Chayat) ISBN 0-86171-559-4.
- 101 Zen Stories (1940).

== See also ==
- Buddhism in the United States
- List of Rinzai Buddhists
- Timeline of Zen Buddhism in the United States
