= American Zen Teachers Association =

Zen organization in the US

The American Zen Teachers Association (AZTA) was founded in the late 1980s as the Second Generation Zen Teachers Group. It is a peer-group organization of ordained and lay Zen Buddhist teachers, all of whom have received either teaching authorization or dharma transmission from the mostly Asian Zen teachers who brought their practices to America in the second half of the twentieth century, or their heirs. The first meetings of the AZTA were attended by a dozen or so people, reflecting what would be a Western Zen phenomenon of roughly equal numbers of men and women.

Today the AZTA has grown to over two hundred members. AZTA members serve Buddhist groups ranging from a dozen or so people who meet and practice in members’ homes or area churches to those serving three or four hundred members and who meet and practice in large temples and monasteries.

== See also ==
- Soto Zen Buddhist Association
- Zen in the USA
- Timeline of Zen Buddhism in the United States
