= Omori Sogen =

Japanese Buddhist monk

Ōmori Sōgen Rōshi
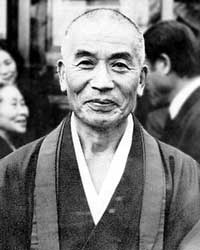
- Title: Rōshi

Personal life
- Born: 1904 Japan
- Died: 1994 (aged 89–90)

Religious life
- Religion: Buddhism
- School: Rinzai

Senior posting
- Based in: Tenryū-ji
- Predecessor: Seki Bokuo

Ōmori Sōgen (大森 曹玄; 1904–1994) was a Japanese Rinzai Rōshi, a successor in the Tenryū-ji line of Rinzai Zen, and former president of Hanazono University, the Rinzai university in Kyoto, Japan. He became a priest in 1945.

== Biography ==
Ōmori Sōgen was a teacher of Kashima Shinden Jikishinkage-ryū swordsmanship, and a calligrapher in the Taishi school of Yamaoka Tesshū. He became well known for his unique approach to Zen practice integrating insights from his martial and fine arts training with traditional Zen methods; this approach has been described as a unity of Zen, Ken ("sword", referring to martial arts or physical culture), and Sho ("brush", referring to calligraphy or fine arts).

Ōmori founded Seitai-ji monastery in Japan and Daihonzan Chozen-ji in Honolulu, Hawaii, the first Rinzai headquarters temple established outside Japan according to Rinzai canon law.

Dharma successors and descendants of Omori Roshi are active in both Japan and the West. In the United States, along with Chozen-ji, successors of its first abbot, Tanouye Tenshin Roshi, established Chosei Zen (formerly Chozen-ji Wisconsin Betsuin) in Madison and Spring Green, Wisconsin, and elsewhere. Successors of Hosokawa Dogen Roshi established Daiyuzenji in Chicago, and Korinji in Reedsburg, Wisconsin. In Germany and Austria, there are active groups connected to Sasaki Gensō Rōshi and Hozumi Genshō Rōshi.

Ōmori is the author of more than 20 books in the Japanese language, including Sanzen Nyumon, which was translated into English and published as An Introduction to Zen Training in 2002. The book is considered a foundational text for Zen students training in the Chozen-ji tradition of Rinzai zen.

Ōmori was also well known for his right-wing ultra-nationalist political activism and influence in government circles prior to the outbreak of the Second World War.

== Notable students ==
- Sasaki Gensō Rōshi
- Kadowaki Kakichi Roshi, Author "Zen and the Bible"
- Tanouye Tenshin Roshi
- Hozumi Gensho Roshi
- Hosokawa Dogen Roshi
- Shiohira Hideki Sensei

== Bibliography ==
- Sogen, Omori; Trevor Leggett; Dōgen Hosokawa; Roy Kenichi Yoshimoto (2002). An Introduction to Zen Training: A Translation of Sanzen Nyumon. Tuttle Publishing. ISBN 0-8048-3247-1. OCLC 47745820.
- Terayama, Katsujō; John Stevens; Omori Sogen (1983). Zen and the Art of Calligraphy: The Essence of Sho. Routledge & Kegan Paul. ISBN 0-7100-9284-9. OCLC 8670132.
- Sogen, Omori; Tanouye Tenshin (1989). Zen & Budo. Daihonzan Chozen-ji / International Zen Dojo Honolulu. ISBN 1877982024.

== Sources ==
- Morisawa, Jackson S. (1988). The Secret of the Target. Routledge. ISBN 0-415-00194-3. OCLC 16582229.
