= Pacific Zen Institute =

Buddhist School in Santa Rosa, California

Religion
- Affiliation: Zen (independent)

Location
- Location: P.O. Box 2972 Santa Rosa, California 95405
- Country: United States

Architecture
- Founder: John Tarrant
- Completed: 1999

Website
- www.pacificzen.org/

The Pacific Zen Institute (PZI), is a Zen Buddhist school centered in Santa Rosa, California, with affiliates in Oakland, San Mateo, Santa Barbara, and Waco, Kentucky. Its students live and practice throughout North America, South America, and Asia. Established in 1999, Pacific Zen's stated mission is to "create a culture of transformation through meditation, koans, conversation, and the arts". Its founding director, John Tarrant, was the first dharma heir to Robert Baker Aitken, in the line of the Sanbo Kyodan school of koan Zen.

Tarrant has claimed to have developed ways of teaching koans that can orient anyone, including those with little or no experience in meditation or Zen, toward awakening to a richer, fuller engagement with their own lives. According to the PZI website:

Koan meditation is a way of showing up for your own life

You sit or work or talk and don't add anything to it. You don't criticize anything your mind offers. You don't need to assess or improve the moment. And if you are criticizing the moment or your own state of mind, you don't criticize that. In that way compassion appears.

Koan meditation offers a path out of the burning house, without abandoning the promise and good-heartedness of being human.

Practice is the last best hope of living up to that good-heartedness, the only thing that never hurts and usually helps. And even at the beginning of the meditation path, on a good day it's exciting. It actually makes you happy.

— John Tarrant, Pacific Zen Institute

The Pacific Zen Institute offers daily meditation (Open Temple), weekly meetings, and multi-day retreats in several California locations including San Rafael (sesshin) and Bolinas (Open Mind), California, as well as virtually.

== Affiliates ==
- Santa Rosa Creek Zen Center (Santa Rosa, CA)
- The Rockridge Meditation Community (Oakland, California)
- Coral Moon Zendo (Santa Barbara, California)
- Portola Camp Zendo (San Mateo, California)
- Bluegrass Zen (Waco, Kentucky)
- Desert Lotus Zen Sangha (Chandler, Arizona)
- San Francisco Wind-In-Grass Sangha (San Francisco)

== Tarrant's biography ==
James Ishmael Ford says of Tarrant,

He is known for pushing the boundaries of Zen institutions, introducing and dropping liturgical experiments—such as allowing Zen sutras to be set to Cajun tunes or passing out grapes during the service—just to see what happens. Today the Pacific Zen Institute is marked by its willingness to innovate and creatively explore the range of Zen disciplines.

John Maxwell Tarrant (born 1949 in Tasmania, Australia) is a Western Zen teacher who explores "meeting the inconceivable" in koan study as a way to discover freedom and build a hand-crafted life. He is both traditional ~ in his use of ancient koan texts ~ and modern ~ as he employs a wide range of Western myths as koans in small group settings.

After graduating for the Australian National University, Tarrant worked at many jobs, ranging from laboring in a copper mine and smelter, to fishing commercially on the Great Barrier Reef. For some time he worked as a lobbyist for the Australian Aboriginal land rights movement. He later earned a Ph.D. in psychology from Saybrook Institute in San Francisco, with a doctoral thesis on "The Design of Enlightenment in Koan Zen." For two decades, he worked as a Jungian psychotherapist as he developed his koan teaching methods. In the late 1990s, he left his practice for write and teach Zen full time.

Tarrant's first Buddhist studies, in the early 1970s, were with Tibetan Lamas who visited Australia. He discovered koans, and lacking any teachers in the Southern Hemisphere, worked on them by himself for a number of years. Later in the United States he passed his first koans with Korean teacher Seung Sahn, and went on to study with Robert Baker Aitken in Hawaii for 9 years, becoming Aitken's first dharma heir. He also did advanced koan work with Koun Yamada, and was given permission by Aitken to teach 1983. In 1987 he founded the organization that evolved into the Pacific Zen Institute (PZI) in Santa Rosa, California.

In February, 2011, Tricycle: The Buddhist Review, a Buddhist quarterly, reported that in 2000, Robert Aitken disowned John Tarrant for sexual indiscretions with students, and also criticized Tarrant's teaching style and conduct as a therapist. As a careful reading shows of the Diamond Sangha Teacher's Circle open letter to Tarrant, published in the March, 2000 Sydney Zen Center Newsletter, Tarrant left the Diamond Sangha a year or two earlier on his own accord. That letter reads, in part: "Over the past three years, we have received from aggrieved members of your sangha numerous, unsolicited complaints of misconduct on your part." Later, all but two of the most senior Diamond Sangha teachers, among the 11 signatories (some teachers declined to participate), expressed no regrets about adding their names to the list. Augusto Alcalde belatedly sent a note of apology to John Tarrant for his own involvement. Pat Hawk recalled, "'That was bad business,' shaking his head. 'I like John [Tarrant].'" PZI never made a public reply to the letter. Interestingly, one of the female students in question was Joan Sutherland, who became a popular teacher and founder of Open Source Zen.

Tarrant has contributed poems to The Paris Review, Threepenny Review and the books Beneath a Single Moon: Buddhism in Contemporary American Poetry; What Book? Buddha Poems From Beat to Hiphop, and The Book of Mu; Essential Writings on Zen's Most Important Koan. Tarrant's own books include The Light Inside the Dark: Zen Soul & The Spiritual Life (HarperCollins) ~ a map of the spiritual journey including the dark bits ~ and Bring Me the Rhinoceros & Other Zen Koans To Bring You Joy (Shambala), which has become a teaching text at many Zen centers for its innovative approach to koans.

PZI's projects include creating new English translations of some of the elements of the sutra collection as well the evolution of musical settings of many parts of the chanted liturgy. Working translator Joan Sutherland and Zydeco band leader Richie Domingue, Tarrant collaborated in developing what is probably the first sung Zen liturgy in an American idiom.

Among Tarrant's successors and collaborators through Pacific Zen Institute include the Joan Sutherland, founder of Open Source Zen; Susan Murphy, a film maker and leader of the Zen Open Circle based in Sydney, Australia; David Weinstein, a therapist in Northern California; James Ishmael Ford, founder of the Boundless Way Zen network; Allison Atwill, a teacher and artist originally from Santa Barbara; Jon Joseph, a former financial analyst from San Mateo; David Parks, a former Christian minister in Waco, Kentucky; Tess Beasley, a therapist from western Connecticut, and Jesse Cardin, a therapist from Volcano, Hawaiʻi.

== Pacific Zen Lineage ==
Tarrant has sanctioned a number of teachers, several of whom have also appointed teachers:

1. Atwill, Allison, Roshi (b. 1959)
  1. Fuentes, Eduardo, Sensei (b. 1946)
2. Barzaghi, Subhana Gyo Shin, Myo-Un-An Roshi (b.1954); (Note: Barzaghi was one of the signatories of the 1999 letter and has thus severed her relationship to Tarrant) also received Transmission from Robert Aitken
3. Beasely, Tess Roshi (b. 1982)
4. Bolleter, Ross Roshi (b. 1946); also appointed by Robert Aitken
5. Boughton, Rachel, Roshi (b. 1961)
6. Cardin, Jesse Roshi (b. 1983)
7. Ford, James Ishmael (b. 1948); also a Soto teacher appointed by Jiyu Kennett Roshi
  1. Blacker, Melissa Keido Myozen Roshi (b. 1954)
8. Joseph, Jon Dokan'un, Roshi (b.1954)
9. Grant, Steven, Roshi (b. 1962)
10. Gaudry, Guy, Roshi
  1. Ross, Lanny Sevan Keido Sei'an Sensei (b. 1951); also holds the Dharma Transmission in the Philip Kapleau lineage
11. Mansfield-Howlett, Rachel, Roshi, (b. 1954) at Santa Rosa City Zen
12. Murphy, Susan Myo Sei Ryu'un An Roshi (b.1950); also received Transmission from Ross Bolleter
13. Parks, Rev. David, Roshi (b. 1954)
14. Saint, Deborah, Sensei (b. 1951)
15. Sutherland, Joan Roshi (b. 1954)
  1. Bender, Sarah Masland Roshi (b. 1948)
  2. Palmer, Andrew Sensei (b. 1971)
  3. Nathanson, Tenney Roshi (b.1946)
16. Terragno, Danièl Ki-Nay Roshi (b. 1947)
  1. Parekh, Antoinette Kenjo Shin (b. 1959), apprentice teacher
17. Twentyman, Craig, Independent teacher
18. Weinstein, David Onryu Ko'un Roshi (b. 1949)

== See also ==
- Buddhism in the United States
- Timeline of Zen Buddhism in the United States

== Bibliography ==
- Ford, James Ishmael (2006). Zen Master Who?: A Guide to the People and Stories of Zen. Wisdom Publications. ISBN 0-86171-509-8.
- Spuler, Michelle (2003). Developments in Australian Buddhism: Facets of the Diamond. Routledge. ISBN 0-7007-1582-7. OCLC 49952207.
- "John Tarrant Biography". Sweeping Zen. 24 November 2023.
- "John Tarrant DIRECTOR OF PACIFIC ZEN INSTITUTE". Pacific Zen Institute.
- Tarrant, John (1987). The design of enlightenment in koan Zen. 3282860.
- "PZI Affiliates: Desert Lotus Zen". Pacific Zen Institute.
- "PZI Affiliates: Rockridge Meditation Community". Pacific Zen Institute.
- "PZI Affiliates: London Zen Center". Pacific Zen Institute. Archived from the original on 2013-01-09.
