= Daihonzan Chozen-ji =

Coordinates: 21.363763°N 157.843293°W

Religion
- Affiliation: Rinzai

Location
- Location: 3565 Kalihi Street, Honolulu, Hawai'i 96819
- Country: United States
- Interactive map of Daihonzan Chozen-ji

Architecture
- Founder: Tenshin Tanouye, Omori Sogen

Website
- www.chozen-ji.org

Daihonzan Chozen-ji (大本山超禅寺) is a Rinzai Zen temple located in Kalihi Valley on the island of Oahu in Hawaii. It was established in 1972 by Omori Sogen and Tenshin Tanouye.

== History ==
In 1970 Omori Sogen and Tenshin Tanouye met in Japan. Tanouye, a music teacher at Farrington High School, trained with Sogen in Japan during summer vacations. Together they established the framework for Chozen-ji and its unique perspective on Zen, combining meditation, martial arts, and fine art.

In 1976 Chozen-ji moved to its current location in the back of Kalihi Valley.

In 1979 Omori Sogen established Chozen-ji as a Daihonzan, the main temple and headquarters of a new line of Zen. This made Chozen-ji the "first Rinzai headquarters temple established outside of Japan."

The temple has been popular among Hawaii's business and political elites, as well as welcoming people from all walks of life and religious affiliations.

== Training approach ==
Spiritual training at Chozen-ji is integrated with the practice of martial and fine arts, such as archery, ceramics and kendo. It is highly physical, with an emphasis on breath and posture.

Chozen-ji was established as a place to bring shugyō (the deepest possible spiritual training) to the West and cultivate kiai, or vibration, in every aspect of life.

== Abbot ==
The founding abbot was Tenshin Tanouye. The current abbot is Daian Sayama.

== Activities ==
Chozen-ji hosts daily zazen and holds regular fine arts and martial arts classes.
