= Rinzai school =

School of Japanese Zen Buddhism

The Rinzai school (Japanese: 臨済宗, romanized: Rinzai-shū, simplified Chinese: 临济宗; traditional Chinese: 臨濟宗; pinyin: Línjì zōng), named after Linji Yixuan (Romaji: Rinzai Gigen, died 866 CE) is one of three sects of Zen in Japanese Buddhism, along with Sōtō and Ōbaku. The Chinese Linji school of Chan Buddhism was first transmitted to Japan by Myōan Eisai (1141–1215). Contemporary Japanese Rinzai is derived entirely from the Ōtōkan lineage transmitted through Hakuin Ekaku (1686–1769), who is a major figure in the revival of the Rinzai tradition.

== History ==
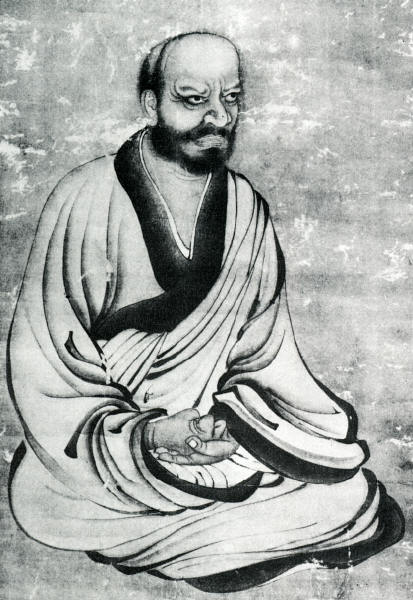
Japanese painting of Linji Yixuan (Japanese: Rinzai Gigen)

The Rinzai school is the Japanese line of the Chinese Linji school of Chan Buddhism. Although Linji Yixuan is usually credited as its founder, as Albert Welter points out, "While the inspiration for the Linji Chan faction was, of course Linji Yixuan, the real founder of the movement was, as noted previously, Shoushan Shengnian (926—993), a fourth-generation descendant."

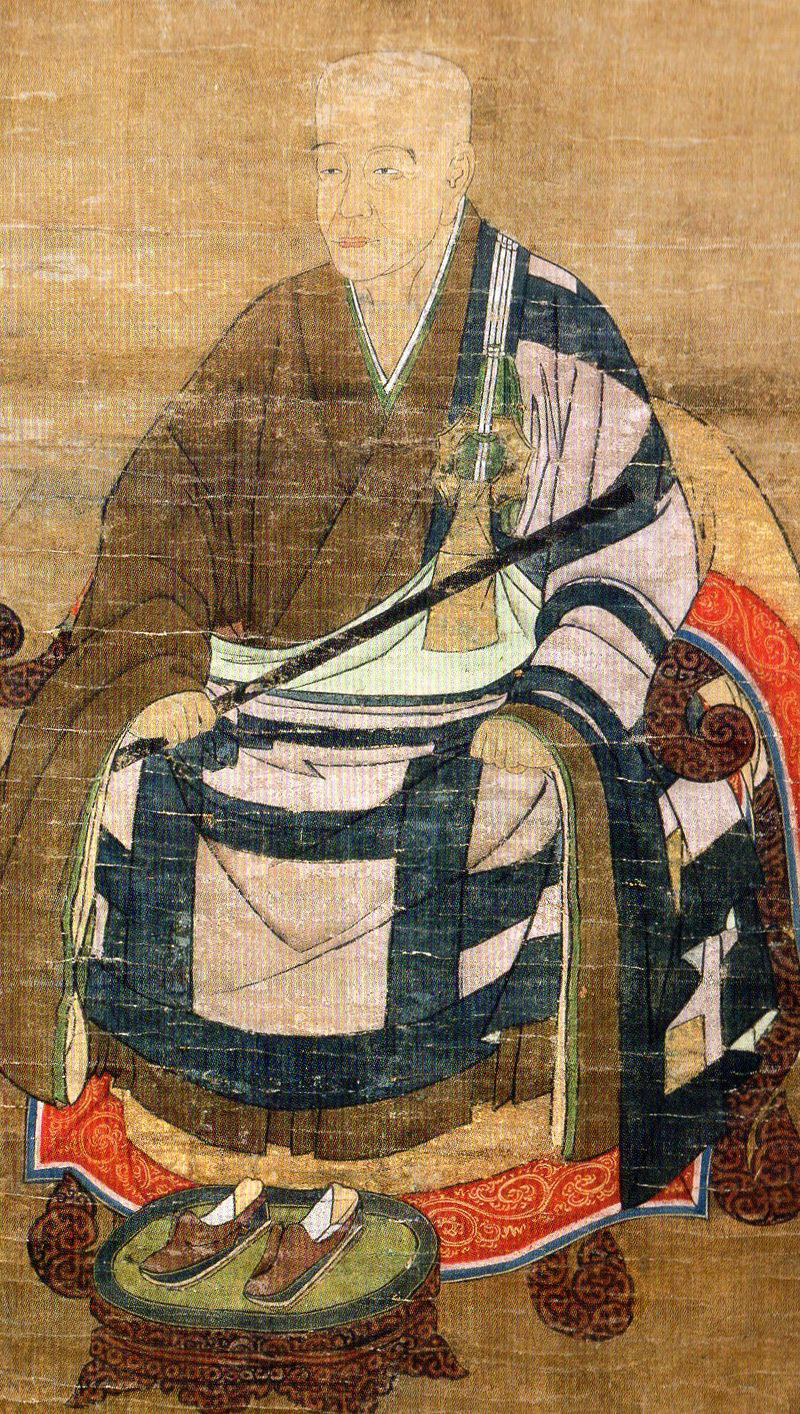
Myōan Eisai, founder of the Rinzai school of Zen in Japan, 12th century

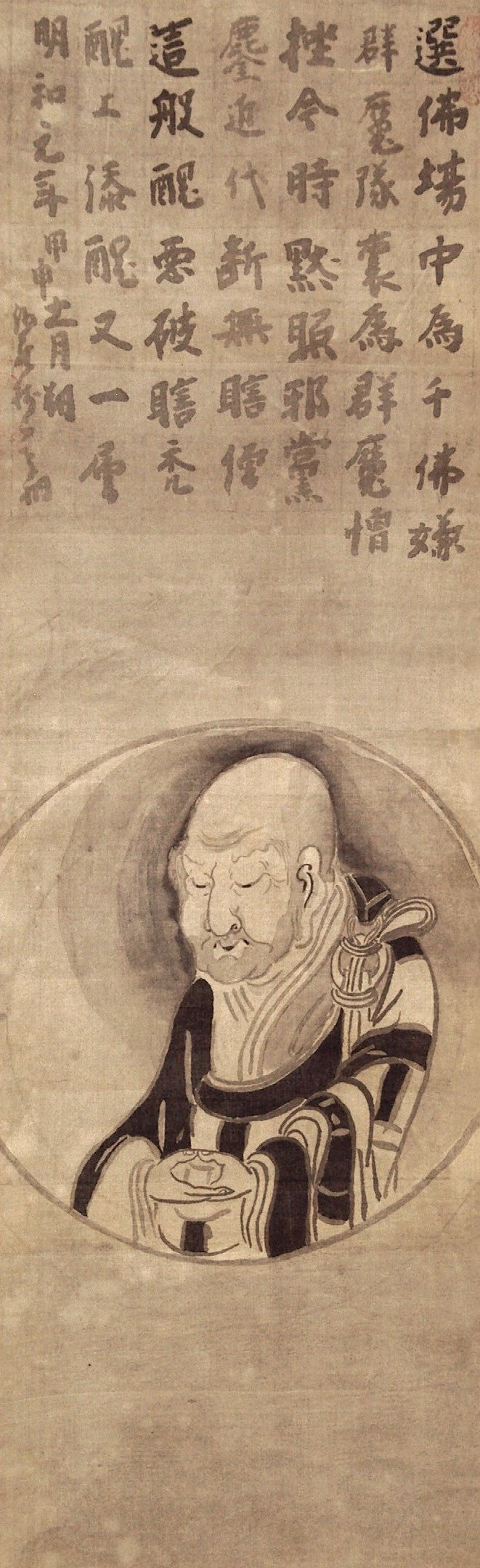
Hakuin Ekaku self portrait

=== Kamakura period (1185–1333) ===
Though there were several attempts to establish Rinzai lines in Japan, it first took root in a lasting way through the efforts of the monk Myōan Eisai. In 1168, Myōan Eisai traveled to China, where he studied Tendai for twenty years. In 1187, he went to China again, and returned to Japan to establish a Linji school of Chan Buddhism, which is known in Japan as Rinzai. Decades later, Nanpo Shōmyō (南浦紹明) (1235–1308), who also studied Linji teachings in China, founded the Japanese Ōtōkan lineage, the most influential and only surviving branch of the Rinzai school of Zen.

Rinzai Zen was established in Japan as the samurai rose to power. Along with early imperial support, Rinzai came to enjoy the patronage of this newly ascendant warrior class.

=== Muromachi (or Ashikaga) period (1336–1573) ===
During the Muromachi period, the Rinzai school was the most successful of the Zen schools in Japan because it was favoured by the shōgun. The school may be said to have truly flowered and achieved a distinctly Japanese identity with Shūhō Myōchō (aka Daitō Kokushi) (宗峰妙超 (大燈国師); 1283–1337) and Musō Soseki (1275–1351), two influential Japanese Zen masters who did not travel to China to study.

==== Five Mountain System ====
In the beginning of the Muromachi period, the Five Mountain System (Gozan) system was fully worked out. The final version contained five temples of both Kyoto and Kamakura, presided over by Nanzen-ji. A second tier of the system consisted of Ten Temples. This system was extended throughout Japan, effectively giving control to the central government, which administered this system. The monks, often well educated and skilled, were employed by the shōgun for the governing of state affairs.

Gozan system
	Kyoto	Kamakura
First Rank	Tenryū-ji	Kenchō-ji
Second Rank	Shōkoku-ji	Engaku-ji
Third Rank	Kennin-ji	Jufuku-ji
Fourth Rank	Tōfuku-ji	Jōchi-ji
Fifth Rank	Manju-ji	Jōmyō-ji

==== Rinka-monasteries ====
Not all Rinzai Zen organisations were under such strict state control. The Rinka monasteries, which were primarily located in rural areas rather than cities, had a greater degree of independence. The Ōtōkan lineage, which centered on Daitoku-ji, also had a greater degree of freedom. It was founded by Nanpo Shōmyō, Shūhō Myōchō, and Kanzan Egen. A well-known teacher from Daitoku-ji was Ikkyū.

Another Rinka lineage was the Hotto lineage, of which Bassui Tokushō is the best-known teacher.

=== Tokugawa (1600–1868) – Hakuin and his heirs ===
By the 18th century, the Rinzai school was challenged by the newly-imported Obaku-lineage, and by the waning of support from the ruling elites. Hakuin Ekaku (1686–1769), with his vigorous zeal for koan-practice and his orientation towards common people, became the hero of a revigorized tradition of koan-study and an outreach to a lay-audience, and most Rinzai lineages claim descent from him, though his engagement with formal Rinzai-institution was minimal. When he was installed as head priest of Shōin-ji in 1718, he had the title of Dai-ichiza, "First Monk":

It was the minimum rank required by government regulation for those installed as temple priests and seems to have been little more than a matter of paying a fee and registering Hakuin as the incumbent of Shōin-ji.

Hakuin considered himself to be an heir of Shōju Rōnin (Dokyō Etan, 1642–1721), but never received formal dharma transmission from him. Nevertheless, through Hakuin, all contemporary Japanese Rinzai-lineages are considered part of the Ōtōkan lineage, brought to Japan in 1267 by Nanpo Jomyo, who received his dharma transmission in China in 1265.

Tōrei Enji (1721–1792), who had studied with Kogetsu Zenzai, was a major student of Hakuin and an influential author, painter and calligrapher. He is the author of the influential The Undying Lamp of Zen (Shūmon mujintō ron), which presents a comprehensive system of Rinzai training.

Through Torei's student Gasan Jitō (1727–1797) Hakuin's approach became a focal point in Japanese Rinzai Zen. Before meeting Hakuin, Gasan received Dharma transmission from Rinzai teacher Gessen Zen'e, who had received dharma transmission from Kogetsu Zenzai. Gasan is often considered to be a dharma heir of Hakuin, despite the fact that "he did not belong to the close circle of disciples and was probably not even one of Hakuin's dharma heirs." Gasan's students Inzan Ien (1751–1814), who also studied with Gessen Zen'e, (Note: terebess.hu, 隱山惟琰 Inzan Ien (1751–1814)) and Takujū Kosen (1760–1833) created a systematized way of koan-study, with fixed questions and answers. In 1808 Inzan Ien became abbott of Myoshin-ji, one of the main Rinzai temples in Japan, where he served for a short time, while Takujū Kosen was appointed as head abbott of Myoshin-ji in 1813. (Note: terebess.hu, 卓洲胡僊 Takujū Kosen (1760–1833)) All contemporary Japanese Rinzai-lineages, and their methods and styles of koan-study, stem from these two teachers, though at the end of the Tokugawa-periond his line was at the brink of extinction.

=== Meiji Restoration (1868–1912) and Imperial Expansionism (1912–1945) ===
During the Meiji period (1868–1912), after a coup in 1868, Japan abandoned its feudal system and opened up to Western modernism. Shinto became the state religion, and Buddhism adapted to the new regime. Within the Buddhist establishment the Western world was seen as a threat, but also as a challenge to stand up to.

A Rinzai university was founded in 1872, Hanazono University, initially as a seminary for those entering the priesthood. Hanazono University has grown to become the major Rinzai higher education institution in Japan.

=== Post-war (1945–present) ===
Modern Rinzai Zen is made up of 15 sects or branches, the largest being the Myoshin-ji line.

Some influential modern Rinzai figures include Ōmori Sōgen (大森 曹玄, 1904–1994), Sōkō Morinaga (盛永 宗興, 1925–1995), Shodo Harada (原田 正道), Eshin Nishimura (西村 惠信; born 1933), Keidō Fukushima (福島 慶道, 1933–2011) and D.T. Suzuki (鈴木 大拙 貞太郎, 1870–1966).

== Literary sources ==
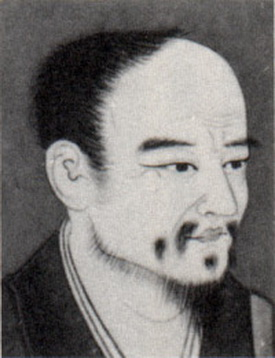
Tōrei Enji

Rinzai is a Mahayana Buddhist tradition that draws from the various Indian Mahayana sutras (like the Diamond Sutra and the Heart Sutra) and shastras (treatises) of the Indian masters. Rinzai also closely follows the works of the Chinese Chan tradition, particularly that of the masters of the Linji school like Linji Yixuan (d. 866) and Dahui Zonggao (1089–1163) and various traditional records of that school, like the Transmission of the Lamp, and the Línjì yǔlù (臨濟語錄; Jp: Rinzai-goroku, the Record of Linji).

Important Japanese sources of the Rinzai school include the works of Hakuin Ekaku and his student Tōrei Enji. Torei's Undying Lamp of Zen (Shūmon mujintō ron) offers a comprehensive overview of Hakuin's Zen and is a major source for Rinzai Zen practice. A more modern overview of Japanese Rinzai praxis is Omori Sogen's Sanzen Nyumon (An Introduction to Zen Training).

== Japanese Rinzai practice ==
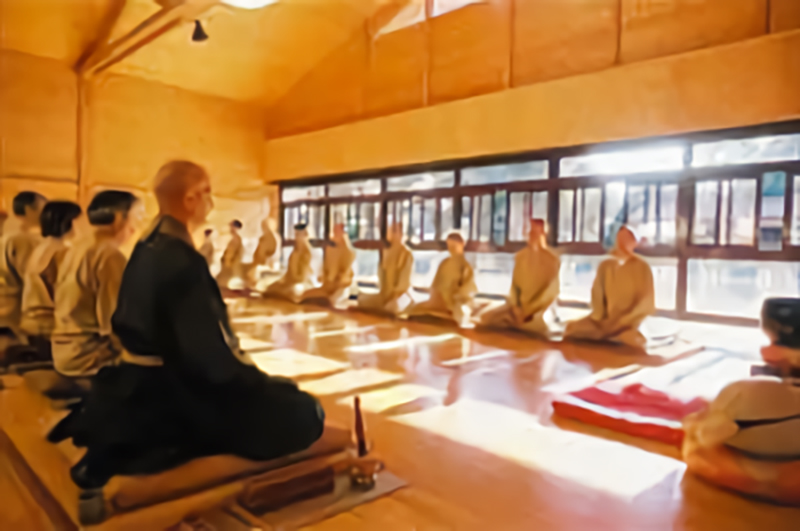
Zazen meditation at the European Center of Rinzai Zen

Fumio Toyoda, at Chozen-ji temple, Hawaii. Toyoda was a Rinzai Zen teacher and a master of Aikido.

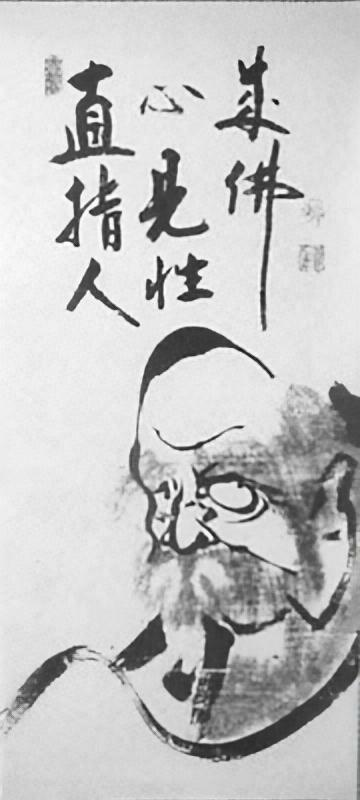
Painting and Calligraphy by Hakuin (depicting Bodhidharma). The text states: "Direct pointing at the mind of man, seeing one's nature and becoming Buddha."

Contemporary Japanese Rinzai Zen is marked by its emphasis on kenshō (見性, "seeing one's/ self nature" or "to see clearly into the buddha-nature") as the gateway to authentic Buddhist practice. Rinzai also stresses the importance of post-kensho spiritual training that actualizes awakening for the benefit of all beings.

The student's relationship with a Zen teacher is another central element of Rinzai Zen practice. This includes the formal practice of sanzen, a private interview between student and master and various methods of "direct pointing" that are used by Rinzai masters to guide the student to the experience of kensho.

Formal Rinzai training focuses on zazen (seated meditation). Practices such as different forms of breath meditation (breath counting, diaphragmatic breathing and tanden, breath cultivation), kōan introspection, wato, and mantra practice (such as using the mantric syllable Ah) are used in zazen. Other practices include walking meditation (Jp. kinhin), ōryōki (a meditative meal practice), and samu (physical work done with mindfulness). Chanting (okyo) Buddhist sutras or dharanis is also a major element of Rinzai practice.

Kōans are a common object of meditation when engaged in formal zazen. Shikantaza ("just sitting") is less emphasized in Rinzai, but still used. This contrasts with Sōtō practice, which has de-emphasized kōans since Gentō Sokuchū (circa 1800), and instead emphasizes shikantaza.

The Rinzai school developed its own formalized style of kōan introspection and training. This includes a standardized curriculum of kōans, which must be studied and "passed" in sequence. This process may include standardized questions (sassho) and common sets of "capping phrases" (jakugo) or poetry citations that are memorized by students as answers. A student's understanding of a kōan is presented to the teacher in a private interview (dokusan, daisan, or sanzen) and the teacher's job is to guide the student to kensho, in part by judging the student's kyōgai. Kōan-inquiry may be practiced during zazen (sitting meditation), kinhin (walking meditation), and throughout all daily activities.

In general, the Rinzai school is known for the rigor and severity of its training methods. The Rinzai style may be characterized as somewhat martial or sharp (following in the spirit of Linji Yixuan). Since the adoption of Rinzai Zen by the Hōjō clan in the 13th century, some Rinzai figures have even developed the samurai arts (budō) within a Zen framework. One influential figure was the Rinzai priest Takuan Sōhō who was well known for his writings on Zen and budō addressed to the samurai class (see The Unfettered Mind). In this regard, Rinzai is often contrasted with another sect of Zen deeply established in Japan, Sōtō, which has been called more gentle and even rustic in spirit. A Japanese saying reflects these perceptions: "Rinzai for the Shōgun, Sōtō for the peasants" (臨済将軍、曹洞土民, Rinzai Shōgun, Sōtō Domin).

The Rinzai school also adopted certain Taoist energy cultivation practices. They were introduced by Hakuin (1686–1769) who learned them from a hermit named Hakuyu. These energetic practices are called naikan. They are mainly based on focusing the mind and one's vital energy (ki) on the tanden (a spot slightly below the navel).

Certain Japanese arts such as painting, calligraphy, poetry, gardening, and the tea ceremony are also often used as methods of Zen cultivation in Rinzai. Hakuin is famously known for his sumi-e (ink and wash) paintings as well as for his calligraphy. Myōan Eisai is said to have popularized green tea in Japan and the famed master of Japanese tea, Sen no Rikyū (1522–1591), was also trained in Rinzai.

== Contemporary Rinzai schools ==
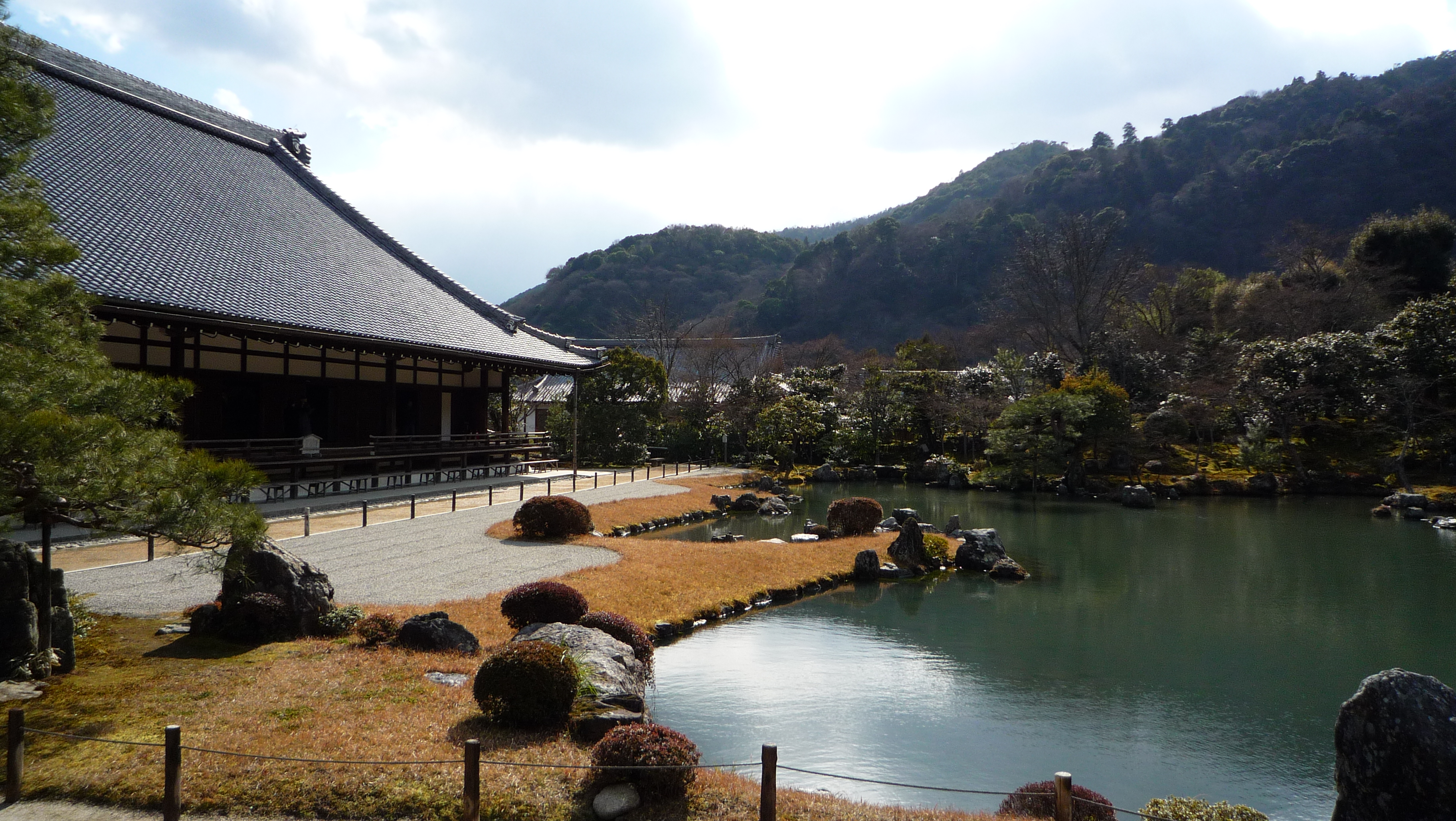
Tenryū-ji

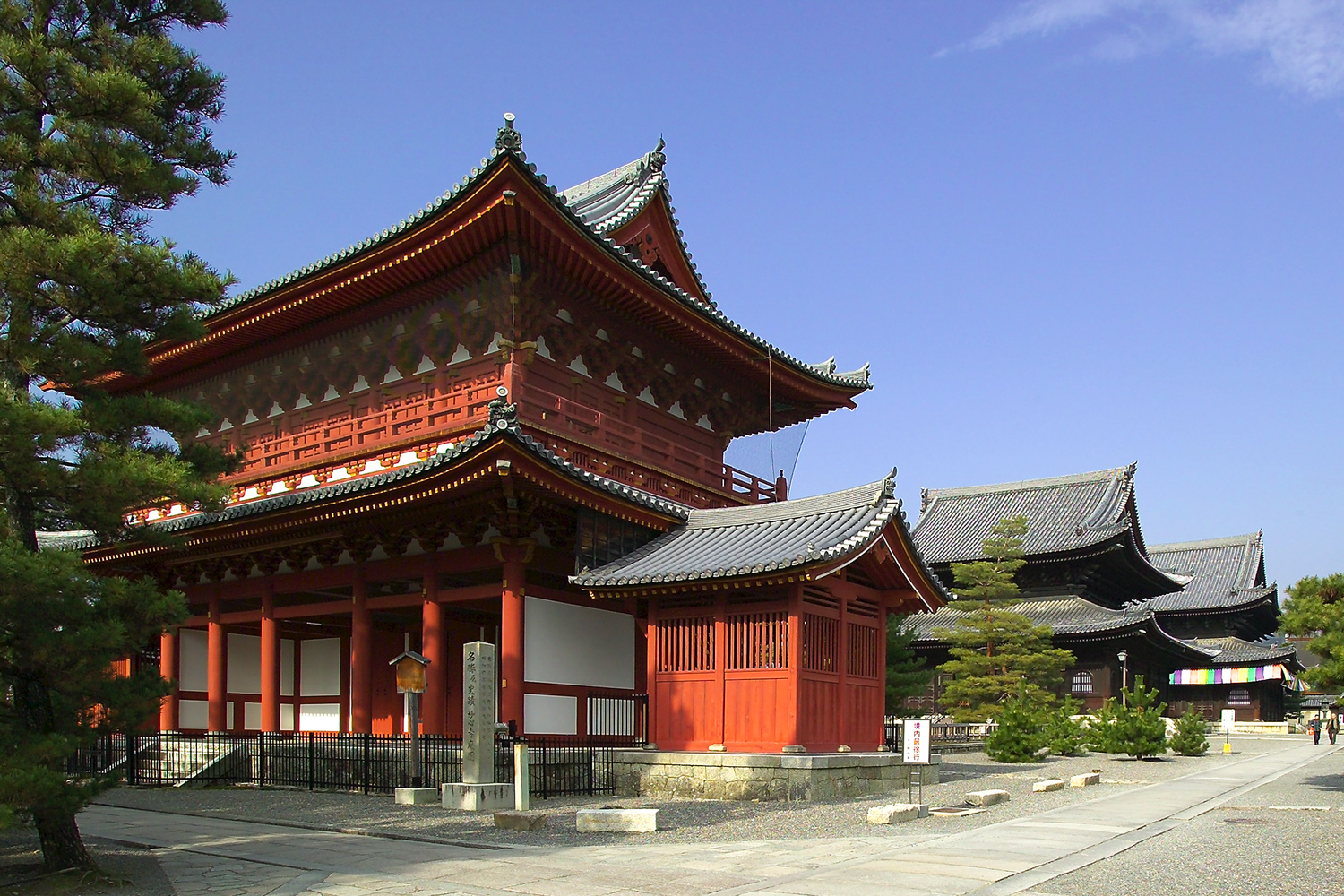
Myōshin-ji

Rinzai Zen in Japan today is not a single organized body. Rather, it is divided into 15 branches (or 16, if Ōbaku is included), referred to by the names of their head temples, of which half are based in Kyoto (8, plus Ōbaku). The largest and most influential of these is the Myōshin-ji branch, whose head temple was founded in 1342 by Kanzan Egen (1277–1360). Other major branches include Nanzen-ji and Tenryū-ji (both founded by Musō Soseki), Daitoku-ji (founded by Shūhō Myōchō), and Tōfuku-ji (founded by Enni Ben'en, 1202–1280). These branches are purely organizational divisions arising from temple history and teacher-student lineage, and do not represent sectarian divides or fundamental differences in practice. There are nevertheless small differences in the way kōans are handled.

These head temples preside over various networks, comprising a total of approximately six thousand temples, forty monasteries, and one nunnery. The Myōshin-ji branch is by far the largest, approximately as big as the other branches combined: it contains within it about three thousand five hundred temples and nineteen monasteries.

=== Japanese Rinzai schools ===
The 15 branches of Rinzai, by head temple, are:

- Kennin-ji (1202)
- Tōfuku-ji (1236, founded by Enni Ben'en, 1202–1280)
- Kenchō-ji (1253)
- Engaku-ji (1282)
- Nanzen-ji (1291, founded by Musō Soseki)
- Kokutai-ji (1300)
- Daitoku-ji (1315, founded by Shūhō Myōchō)
- Kōgaku-ji (1380)
- Myōshin-ji (sect founded 1337, temple founded in 1342 by Kanzan Egen)
- Tenryū-ji (1339, founded by Musō Soseki)
- Eigen-ji (1361)
- Hōkō-ji (1384)
- Shōkoku-ji (1392)
- Buttsū-ji (1397, affiliated with Tenryū-ji until 1905)
- Kōshō-ji (1603) (Note: 興聖寺 (in Japanese)) (Note: 上京区の史蹟百選，区民誇りの木／興聖寺，ケヤキ (100 Selected Historic Sites of Kamigyō ward, Ward Citizen's Pride Trees/Kōshō-ji, Keyaki) (in Japanese))

=== Western Rinzai ===
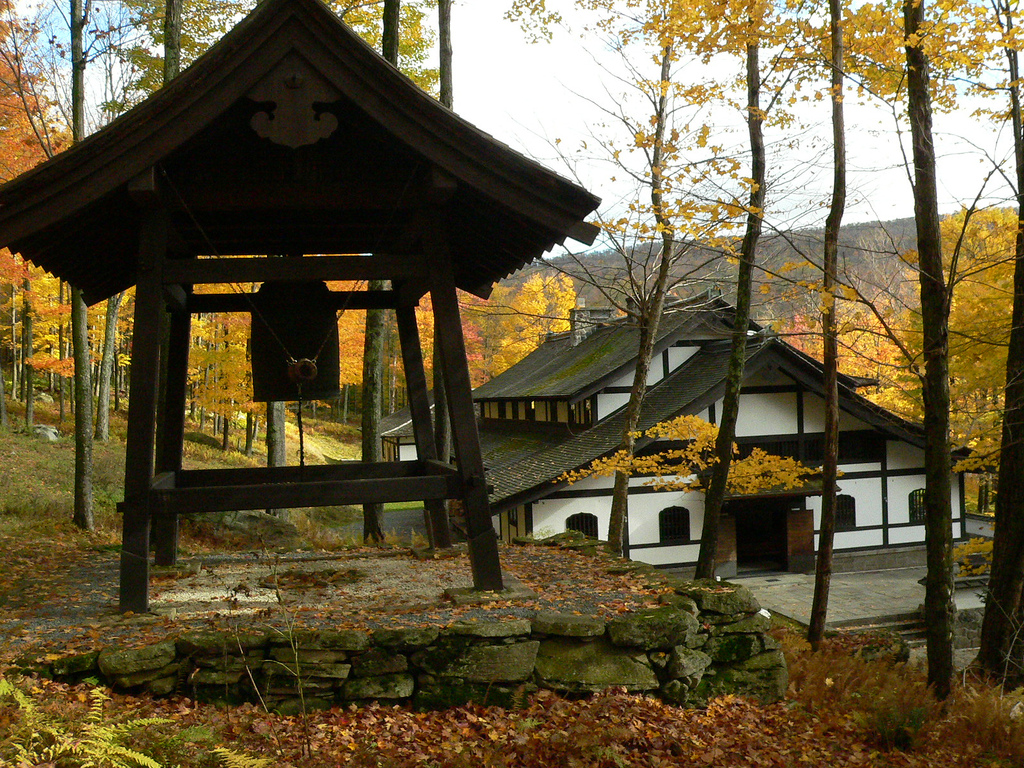
Dai Bosatsu Zendo Kongo-ji, located in the Catskill Mountains of upstate New York

A number of Rinzai lines have been transplanted from Japan to Europe, the Americas, and Australia, and non-Japanese practitioners have been certified as teachers and successors of those lineages. Rinzai temples, as well as practice groups led by lay practitioners, may now be found in many nations.

North American Rinzai centers include Rinzai-ji founded by Kyozan Joshu Sasaki Roshi and the Pacific Zen Institute founded by John Tarrant Roshi in California, Dai Bosatsu Zendo Kongo-ji established by Eido Shimano Roshi and Soen Nakagawa Roshi in New York, Chozen-ji founded by Omori Sogen Roshi in Hawaii, Daiyuzenji in Illinois and Korinji in Wisconsin both founded by dharma heirs in Omori Sogen Roshi's line, and Chobo-Ji founded by Genki Takabayashi Rōshi in Seattle, Washington. In Europe there is Havredal Zendo established by a Dharma Heir of Eido Shimano, Egmund Sommer (Denko Mortensen).

== Related Japanese Zen schools ==
=== Obaku ===
Aside from Rinzai and Sōtō, there is a third tradition of Zen present in Japan, the Ōbaku Zen sect. It was brought to Japan in the 17th century, and shows significant influence from the Pure Land school. This reflects the syncretistic tendencies that developed in Chinese Buddhism in the centuries after the earlier Rinzai lines had been transmitted to Japan.

Ōbaku is also descended from the Chinese Linji school, and so technically may be considered a part of the Japanese Rinzai movement; further, its abbots are now part of the same Ōtōkan lineage as Rinzai branches, though they were not so originally (instead following a more recent Chinese lineage). While Manpuku-ji, the Ōbaku headquarters temple, is considered one of the 15 Rinzai branches mentioned above, Ōbaku Zen is administratively separate from the other 14 branches and continues to maintain its own distinct identity.

=== Fuke ===
A final Japanese Zen sect that self-identified as descending from the Linji school was the Fuke sect; Fuke Zen was suppressed with the Meiji Restoration in the 19th century and no longer exists. Its influence on the development of music for the shakuhachi (bamboo flute), however, has been great.

=== Ichibata Yakushi Kyodan ===
Ichibata Yakushi Kyodan (properly written Ichiba Yakushi Kyōdan 一畑薬師教団) is today generally considered an independent school of Buddhism, though it was previously associated with Myōshin-ji (and before that Tendai), and may still be considered part of Rinzai, though its practices and beliefs have little in common with Rinzai. It places great importance in faith in Yakushi (Medicine Buddha), and is known as a destination for healing.

== Cultural influence ==
Remarkable results of the early relationship between Rinzai Zen and the ruling classes were a strong Rinzai influence on education and government, and Rinzai contributions to a great flowering of Japanese cultural arts such as calligraphy, painting, literature, tea ceremony, Japanese garden design, architecture and even martial arts. A perhaps unanticipated result is that Soto Zen temples, with their connection and appeal to commoners, eventually came to outnumber Rinzai temples.

== See also ==
- Linji Yixuan
- Zen
- Ōbaku (school of Buddhism)
- Hakuin Ekaku

== Sources ==
Printed sources

- Besserman, Perle; Steger, Manfred B. (2011), Zen Radicals, Rebels, and Reformers, Wisdom Publications Inc., ISBN 9780861716913
- Borup, Jørn (2008), Japanese Rinzai Zen Buddhism: Myōshinji, a Living Religion, Leiden & Boston: Brill, ISBN 9789004165571
- Dumoulin, Heinrich (2000), A History of Zen Buddhism, New Delhi: Munshiram Manoharlal Publishers Pvt. Ltd.
- Dumoulin, Heinrich (2005a), Zen Buddhism: A History. Volume 1: India and China, World Wisdom Books, ISBN 978-0-941532-89-1
- Dumoulin, Heinrich (2005b), Zen Buddhism: A History. Volume 2: Japan, World Wisdom Books, ISBN 978-0-941532-90-7
- McMahan, David L. (2008), The Making of Buddhist Modernism, Oxford University Press, ISBN 9780195183276
- Mohr, Michel (1999), Hakuin. In Buddhist Spirituality: Later China, Korea, Japan, and the Modern World, edited by Yoshinori Takeuchi et al., New York: A Herder & Herder Book, The Crossroad Publishing Company, ISBN 0824515951
- Moore, Meido (2018), The Rinzai Zen Way: A Guide to Practice, Shambhala Publications
- Snelling, John (1987), The Buddhist handbook. A Complete Guide to Buddhist Teaching and Practice, London: Century Paperbacks
- Stevens, John (1999), Zen Masters. A Maverick, a Master of Masters, and a Wandering Poet. Ikkyu, Hakuin, Ryokan, Kodansha International
- Victoria, Brian Daizen (2006). Zen at War (Second ed.). Rowman & Littlefield. ISBN 9781461647478.
- Waddell, Norman (2010), Wild Ivy: The Spiritual Autobiography of Zen Master Hakuin, Boston, MA: Shambhala, ISBN 9781590308097
- Williams, Paul (1994), Mahayana Buddhism, Routledge

Web-sources
