= Soto Zen Buddhist Association =

The Soto Zen Buddhist Association was formed in 1996 by American and Japanese Zen teachers to draw together the various autonomous lineages of the North American Sōtō stream of Zen together for mutual support as well as the development of common training and ethical standards. With about one hundred fully transmitted priests, the SZBA now includes members from most of the Japanese-derived Sōtō Zen lineages in North America. SZBA presidents include: Sojun Mel Weitsman, Myogen Steve Stucky, Jishō Warner (the first female president), Eido Carney, Kyogen Carlson, Gaelyn Godwin, Taihaku Priest, Hozan Senauke, Tenku Ruff, Sosan Flynn, and Dokai Georgesen.

The Soto Zen Buddhist Association approved a document honoring the women ancestors in the Zen tradition at its biannual meeting on October 8, 2010. Female ancestors, dating back 2,500 years from India, China, and Japan, are now being more regularly included in the curriculum, ritual, and training offered to Western Zen students.

== See also ==
- Zenshuji Soto Misson
