= Zoketsu Norman Fischer =

American poet, writer, and Soto Zen priest

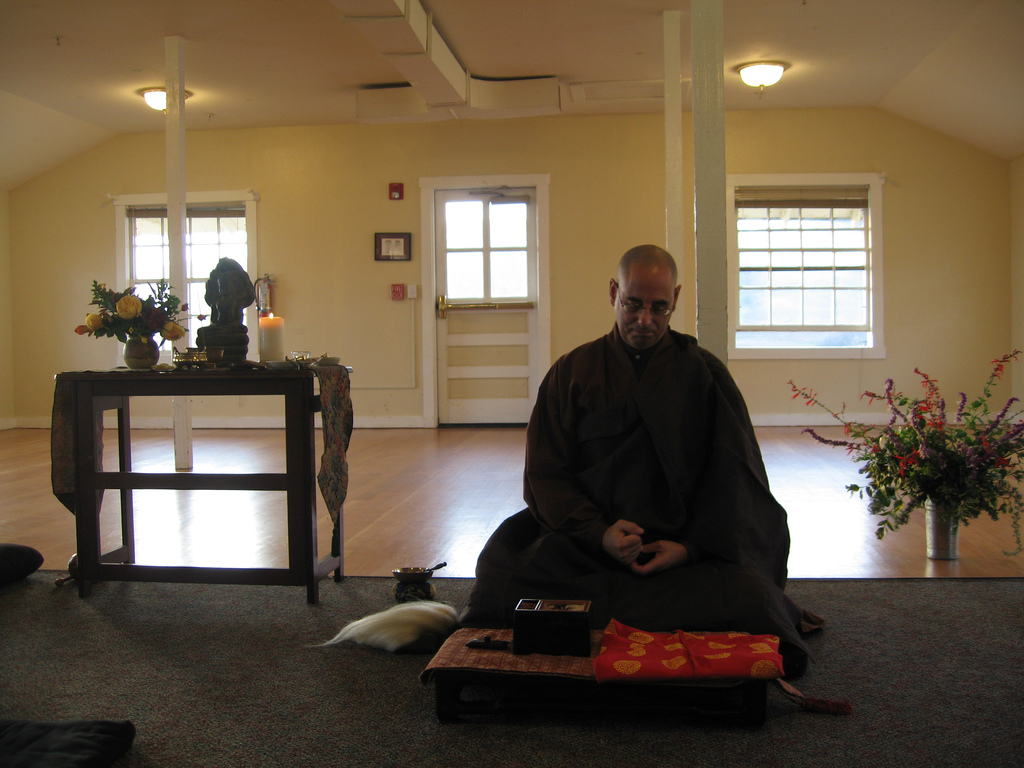
- Title: Roshi

Personal life
- Born: c. 1946 Wilkes-Barre, Pennsylvania, United States
- Spouse: Kathie Fischer
- Children: Aron and Noah (twins)
- Education: University of Iowa; University of California, Berkeley; Graduate Theological Union
- Website: www.everydayzen.org www.bellinghamzen.org

Religious life
- Religion: Zen Buddhism
- School: Sōtō
- Lineage: Shunryu Suzuki

Senior posting
- Based in: Everyday Zen Foundation
- Predecessor: Sojun Mel Weitsman

Zoketsu Norman Fischer is an American poet, writer, and Soto Zen priest, teaching and practicing in the lineage of Shunryu Suzuki. He is a Dharma heir of Sojun Mel Weitsman, from whom he received Dharma transmission in 1988. Fischer served as co-abbot of the San Francisco Zen Center from 1995–2000, after which he founded the Everyday Zen Foundation in 2000, a network of Buddhist practice group and related projects in Canada, the United States and Mexico. Fischer has published more than twenty-five books of poetry and non-fiction, as well as numerous poems, essays and articles in Buddhist magazines and poetry journals.

== Early life and education ==
Norman Fischer was born to a Jewish family in Wilkes-Barre, Pennsylvania in 1946, and was raised in Pittston, Pennsylvania. As a child he attended services with his parents at a Conservative synagogue. He received a B.A. from Colgate University, where he studied religion, philosophy, and literature, an M.F.A. in poetry from the Iowa Writers' Workshop at the University of Iowa, and an M.A. in history and phenomenology of religion at the University of California, Berkeley, and the Graduate Theological Union.

== Religious practice ==
=== Zen training, service and teaching ===
From 1970 through 1976, Fischer trained at the Berkeley Zen Center, a temple in the lineage of Shunryu Suzuki, under the guidance of Sojun Mel Weitsman. In 1976, he and his wife moved to Tassajara, a training monastery near Big Sur, where they lived as residential monastics for five years. In 1980, they were both ordained as Zen priests by Zentatsu Richard Baker, from whom Fischer received the dharma name Zoketsu Rinsho. In 1981, they moved to Green Gulch Farm Zen Center in Marin County, California, where Fischer served in various monastic positions including Director, Tanto (Head of Practice), and Co-Abbot from 1981 to 2000. During that time, in 1988, he received Dharma transmission from his longtime teacher, Sojun Mel Weitsman.

From 1995 to 2000, Fischer served as co-abbot of the San Francisco Zen Center (SFZC), first with Sojun Mel Weitsman, and then with Zenkei Blanche Hartman. During his abbacy, Fischer supported the research, drafting and formal institution of a women's lineage chant, alongside the traditional men's lineage chant, during services. Later, with poet and translator Peter Levitt, he supported the drafting of an official women's lineage paper—the first female lineage document in the history of any major world religion—which traces the line of female practitioners from the Buddha's time to the present and recognizes the important historical role of the Zen women ancestors.

As a senior Dharma teacher, Fischer continues to participate at the San Francisco Zen Center and its affiliate temples, giving talks and leading practice events. In 2000, he founded the Everyday Zen Foundation, which has practice groups in Canada, the United States and Mexico.

Fischer has also integrated Buddhist contemplative practices in business, law, and education—specifically for hospice workers, software engineers, and conflict resolution specialists. In 1987, Fischer founded (among others) the Zen Hospice Project at the San Francisco Zen Center, for which he served as board chair for over 20 years, and is now emeritus chair. He is also a faculty member of the Metta Institute, a training institute for hospice caregivers.

In 2007, he developed (along with Chade-Meng Tan, Mirabai Bush, Daniel Golemen and Jon Kabat-Zinn) the course on mindfulness and emotional intelligence, "Search Inside Yourself", which was originally taught at Google's program for employees, and has now been taught to over 20,000 people in more than 100 cities. Fischer is currently involved with conflict resolution work at Gary Friedman and Jack Himmelstein's Center for Understanding in Conflict, where he trains conflict resolution professionals.

He has also consulted with U.S. Army chaplains about incorporating Zen practices into their work. He has taught and lectured at Harvard, Yale, Brown and Stanford universities and in 2014, he gave the baccalaureate address at Stanford University. He has also served as mentor to teenage boys; this experience is chronicled in his book Taking Our Places: The Buddhist Path to Truly Growing Up (HarperOne, 2003).

Fischer also teaches Zen workshops and retreats on the importance of compassion practice, as modeled in his book, Training in Compassion: Zen Teachings on the Practice of Lojong (Shambhala, 2013). This was the subject of a Spring 2016 online course taught by Fischer, and offered through Tricycle Magazine, in collaboration with San Francisco Zen Center.

=== Interreligious dialogue ===
Fischer is a proponent of interreligious dialogue between the world's religions, stating:

I feel that in our period it is the challenge of religious traditions to do something more than simply reassert and reinterpret their faiths, hoping for loyal adherents to what they perceive to be the true doctrine. Looking back at the last century, with its devastating wars and holocausts and the shock of ecological vulnerability, I have the sense that religious traditions must now have a wider mission, and it is in the recognition of this mission, I believe, that interreligious dialogue becomes something not only polite and interesting, but also essential.

He currently sits on the Board of World Religious Leaders for the Elijah Interfaith Institute, an interreligious dialogue organization. In July 1996, he attended a five-day meeting between members of different religions held at The Abbey of Our Lady of Gethsemani in Trappist, Kentucky, where he gave a talk about Dogen, zazen, and the importance of religions coming together—despite their different philosophies—to serve humanity. Fischer has participated in interreligious pilgrimages with Father Laurence Freeman OSB and the Dalai Lama. Fischer has been active in the Jewish meditation movement since the 1990s, working at first with Rabbi Alan Lew, and now with rabbis and Jewish meditation teachers from around the world. In January 2000, he and Rabbi Lew founded Makor Or, a Jewish Meditation Center in San Francisco, which Fischer now continues to direct, in the wake of Rabbi Lew's 2009 death.

Fischer has written about the concept of God being integral to Judaism and many other religions. In his book Opening to You: Zen-Inspired Translations of the Psalms (Viking, 2002), Fischer replaced the words "God", "King", and "Lord" with the word "You." He explains:

For many of the religious seekers I encounter, the word God has been all but emptied of its spiritual power. The relationship to God that is charted out in the Psalms is a stormy one, co-dependent, passionate, confusing, loyal, petulant, sometimes even manipulative. I wanted to find a way to approach these poems so as to emphasize the relational aspect, while avoiding the major distancing pitfalls that words like God, King, Lord and so on create.

== Writing ==
=== Poetry ===
During Fischer's years at The Iowa Writers' Workshop, he met poets associated with the L=A=N=G=U=A=G=E poetry movement of the seventies and eighties. After receiving his MFA in poetry from the University of Iowa in 1970, he moved to San Francisco where he remained associated with the movement, writing language-centered avant-garde poetry with a spiritual bent and publishing his first poems in 1979. His first collection Like a Walk Through a Park (Open Books, 1980) comprises poems written at Tassajara Zen Mountain Monastery, where he was in residence with poets Jane Hirshfield and Philip Whalen. After Whalen's death in 2003, Fischer became his literary executor.

Fischer has since published over fifteen volumes of poetry. His poetry has been published in literary magazines such as Talisman, Jacket, Mag City, Fracture, Tinfish, Bezoar, Periodics, Bombay Gin, Raddle Moon, Gallery Works, Crayon, and Antenym, among others, and anthologized in The Wisdom Anthology of North American Poetry, and Basta Azzez enough.

Charles Bernstein has called Fischer's poetry "illuminating and essential" and Ron Silliman says "nobody gives more completely of himself in the act of writing than Norman Fischer ... I am in awe of this gift."

Fischer is a founding board member of Poets in Need, an organization that grants emergency funds to poets in financial distress.

=== Non-fiction ===
Fischer has written nine books on Zen, and numerous essays and books on writing, poetry, and spirituality. His essays have been published in magazines such as Buddhadharma, Tricycle and Shambhala Sun, and in collections such as Radical Poetics and Secular Jewish Culture (University of Alabama Press, 2010) and The Best Buddhist Writing (Shambhala Sun).

== Personal life ==
Fischer lives in Muir Beach, California with his wife Kathie, a retired middle school science teacher and ordained Zen priest. In 2012, Kathie received dharma transmission from Sojun Mel Weitzman, and since her retirement from teaching in 2016, has been co-leading Zen workshops and retreats with Norman.

They have twin sons, Aron and Noah, and three grandchildren.

Aron Fischer is a New York attorney, and Noah Fischer, also based in New York, is a conceptual artist and political activist, whose work is shown internationally.

== Bibliography ==
- Fischer, Norman (2021). When You Greet Me I Bow: Notes and Reflections from a Life in Zen. Shambhala Publications. ISBN 9781611808216.
- Fischer, Norman (2019). The World Could Be Otherwise: Imagination and the Bodhisattva Path. Shambhala Publications. ISBN 9781611805048.
- Fischer, Norman (2018). On A Train At Night (To). University of Rouen Press. ISBN 979-1024010090.
- Fischer, Norman (2018). Untitled Series: Life As It Is (Notebook 97). Talisman House. ISBN 978-1584981336.
- Fischer, Norman (2017). any would be if. Chax Press. ISBN 9781946104052.
- Fischer, Norman; Moon, Susan (2016). What is Zen?: Plain Talk for a Beginner's Mind. Shambhala Publications. ISBN 9781611802436.
- Fischer, Norman (2015). Experience: Thinking, Writing, Language & Religion. University of Alabama Press. ISBN 9780817358280.
- Fischer, Norman (2015). Magnolias All At Once. Singing Horse Press. ISBN 9780935162806.
- Fischer, Norman. Little Yellow Notebook: A Poem for Lissa Wolsak. Open Books.
- Fischer, Norman (2014). Escape this Crazy Life of Tears: Japan, July 2010. TinFish Press. ISBN 9780989186131.
- Fischer, Norman (2013). Training in Compassion: Zen Teachings on the Practice of Lojong. Shambhala Publications. ISBN 9781611800401.
- Fischer, Norman (2013). The Strugglers. Singing Horse Press. ISBN 9780935162493.
- Fischer, Norman (2012). Conflict. Chax Press. ISBN 9780925904720.
- Fischer, Norman; Boorstein, Sylvia; Rinpoche, Tsokyni (2011). Solid Ground: Buddhist Wisdom for Difficult Times. Parallax Press. ISBN 9781935209812.
- Fischer, Norman (2009). Questions/Places/Voices/Seasons. Singing Horse Press. ISBN 9780935162431.
- Fischer, Norman (2008). Sailing Home: Using Homer's Odyssey to Navigate Life's Perils and Pitfalls. Simon and Schuster. ISBN 978-1416560210.
- Fischer, Norman (2008). Charlotte's Way. TinFish Press. ISBN 9780978992958.
- Fischer, Norman (2005). I Was Blown Back. Singing Horse Press. ISBN 0935162321.
- Fischer, Norman; Whalen, Philip (2004). Slowly But Dearly. Chax Press. ISBN 0925904414.
- Fischer, Norman (2003). Taking Our Places : The Buddhist Path to Truly Growing Up. HarperSanFrancisco. ISBN 0060505516.
- Fischer, Norman (2002). Opening to You: Zen-Inspired Translations of the Psalms. Viking Press. ISBN 0670030619.
- Fischer, Norman; Berry, Patrick; Henry, Patrick (Ed.) (2001). Benedict's Dharma: Buddhists Reflect on the Rule of Saint Benedict. Riverhead Books. ISBN 1573221902.
- Fischer, Norman (2000). Success: A Poem. Singing Horse Press. ISBN 0935162194.
- Fischer, Norman (1998). The Narrow Roads of Japan. Ex Nihilo Press. ISBN 096632241X.
- Fischer, Norman (1993). Precisely the Point Being Made: A Book of Poems. Chax Press. ISBN 1882022149.
- Fischer, Norman (1987). On Whether or Not to Believe in Your Mind'. Great Barrington: The Figures. ISBN 0935724265.
- Fischer, Norman (1989). Turn Left In Order to Go Right. O Books. ISBN 1882022009.
- Fischer, Norman (1995). Jerusalem Moonlight: An American Zen Teacher Walks the Path of His Ancestors. Clear Glass Press. ISBN 0931425468.
- Fischer, Norman (1987). The Devices. Potes and Poets Press. ISBN 0937013218.
- Fischer, Norman (1984). Why People Lack Confidence In Chairs: A Poem. Coffee House Press. ISBN 0918273072.
- Fischer, Norman (1980). Like a Walk Through a Park. Open Books. ISBN 0931416019.
