= Peter Schneider (Zen priest) =

- Title: Abbot

Personal life
- Born: 1937 (age 88–89) Connecticut
- Spouse: Jane Schneider

Religious life
- Religion: Zen Buddhism
- School: Sōtō
- Lineage: Shunryu Suzuki

Senior posting
- Teacher: Shunryu Suzuki
- Based in: Beginner's Mind Zen Center
- Website: www.beginnersmindzencenter.org

Peter Schneider (born 1937) is a Sōtō Zen priest, founder of Beginner's Mind Zen Center, located in Northridge, California.

== Biography ==
Peter and Jane Schneider were early students of Shunryu Suzuki-roshi in the 1960s. Both served as Suzuki-roshi's jisha (personal attendant) in the early years of the Tassajara Zen Mountain Center. Peter and Jane also assisted in transcription of his dharma talks for later publishing. Following Suzuki-roshi's death, they accepted scholarships from the San Francisco Zen Center to study Buddhism in Japan. They lived and studied in Japan from 1973 to 1995. They founded the Beginner's Mind Zen Center (originally the Northridge Zen Center) in 2004.

Peter Schneider first studied with Shunryu Suzuki-roshi in 1962 and returned to continue in 1967. He served as the second director of Tassajara Zen Mountain Center, as well as president of the San Francisco Zen Center. Peter received priest ordination from Suzuki-roshi in 1970. In 2002 he received dharma transmission from Sojun Mel Weitsman-roshi of the Berkeley Zen Center. Peter is a member of the American Zen Teacher's Association.

Jane Schneider studied with Shunryu Suzuki-roshi from 1967 until his death in 1971. She served as secretary for the San Francisco Zen Center. In 1973 Jane received priest ordination from Zentatsu Richard Baker-roshi. Currently she is studying with Myoan Grace Schireson, a dharma heir in the Suzuki-roshi tradition, in preparation for dharma transmission.

== See also ==
- Buddhism in the United States
- Timeline of Zen Buddhism in the United States
