= Seirin Barbara Kohn =

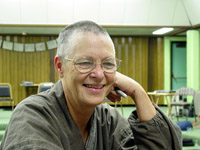
- Title: Sensei

Personal life
- Website: www.austinzencenter.org

Religious life
- Religion: Zen Buddhism
- School: Sōtō

Senior posting
- Based in: Austin Zen Center

Seirin Barbara Kohn is a Sōtō Zen teacher and head priest of The Austin Zen Center (AZC) in Austin, Texas, practicing in the lineage of Shunryū Suzuki. She was ordained as a Soto priest by Reb Anderson and received Dharma transmission from Zenkei Blanche Hartman—Kohn being Hartman's first Dharma heir. The Austin Zen Center's temple name, Zenkei-ji, is named after Blanche Hartman. Kohn became head priest and resident teacher of AZC on October 13, 2002. Before assuming her leadership of AZC, Kohn served as President of the San Francisco Zen Center. Kohn is a supporter of LGBTQ rights, having been known to offer "commitment ceremonies" for same-sex couples, stating, "I simply treat them all the same."

== See also ==
- Buddhism in the United States
- Timeline of Zen Buddhism in the United States
