= Blanche Hartman =

American Zen Buddhist leader (1926–2016)

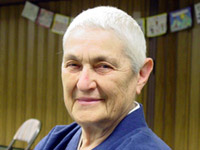
- Title: Roshi

Personal life
- Born: May 8, 1926 Birmingham, Alabama, U.S.
- Died: May 13, 2016 (aged 90) San Francisco, California, U.S.
- Spouse: Lou Hartman
- Children: 4 (including Nina Hartley)
- Education: B.A.
- Website: http://www.sfzc.org/

Religious life
- Religion: Zen Buddhism
- School: Sōtō
- Lineage: Shunryu Suzuki
- Profession: Zen teacher, Author of Seeds for A Boundless Life (Shambhala Publications 2015)- compiled by Zenju Earthlyn Manuel

Senior posting
- Predecessor: Sojun Mel Weitsman
- Successor: Seirin Barbara Kohn; Kosho McCall, Ryumon Gutierrez-Baldoquin, Jana Drakka (deceased), Cathleen Williams, Tony Patchell, John King (deceased), Lien Shutt, Joan Amaral and Zenju Earthlyn Manuel.

Zenkei Blanche Hartman (née Gelders; May 8, 1926 – May 13, 2016) was a Soto Zen teacher practicing in the lineage of Shunryu Suzuki. From 1996 to 2002 she served two terms as co-abbess of the San Francisco Zen Center. She was the first woman to assume such a leadership position at the center. A member of the American Zen Teachers Association, Blanche was especially known for her expertise in the ancient ritual of sewing a kesa. Hartman became known for her attention to issues faced by women; she and her late husband Lou Hartman had four children, eight grandchildren, and a number of great-grandchildren.

== Biography ==
Blanche Hartman was born in Birmingham, Alabama to non-practicing Jewish parents, Joseph Gelders and Esther Frank in 1926. Educated in the Catholic school system in the early 1930s—and impressed with the religiosity and faith of one teacher—in 1943 she moved to California, where her father served in the military. After taking up biochemistry and chemistry at the University of California she married Lou Hartman in 1947, giving birth to four children. In the late 1950s she found work as a chemist, though by 1968 she began questioning the direction of her life. She and her husband began sitting zazen regularly at the Berkeley Zen Center in Berkeley, California in 1969, and in 1972 the two entered Tassajara Zen Mountain Center. The couple lived at all of the other San Francisco Zen Center sites, including City Center and Green Gulch Farm. (Lou died in 2011 and Blanche later lived at AgeSong.) During the 1970s, Blanche received training in Nyoho-e – a traditional method for sewing Buddha's robe—in the lineage of Sawaki Kodo Roshi from Kasai Joshin Sensei, formerly of Antaiji. Blanche was fundamental to the spread of devotional sewing practice throughout North America. She and Lou were both ordained as priests by Zentatsu Richard Baker in 1977, and Blanche was given the Buddhist name Zenkei (meaning inconceivable joy). In 1988 she received shiho from Sojun Mel Weitsman, and in 1996 she became installed as co-abbess of the San Francisco Zen Center. This was the first female abbess of the City Center, having served just after Tenshin Reb Anderson and Sojun Mel Weitsman. One reason Blanche accepted the position of co-abbess, serving two terms from 1996 to 2002, is that she understood the need for women to have a role model.

== Character ==
According to the author James Ishmael Ford, Hartman was "... seen as a quiet and yet compelling leader exercising her authority through her simple and pure presence, a true heir to Suzuki's Dharma." She was known to be particularly involved with advocacy for women and her concern for children, with The Encyclopedia of Women and Religion in North America stating that, "[She] has offered various special teachings for women. In 1992 she led an all-female practice period at Rinso-in, Suzuki-roshi's home temple. This is the first time in the 500-year history of the temple that women have conducted a training period there. She has also led women's all-day retreats at Green Gulch Zen Center in Mill Valley, California. Additionally, she has honored lost and aborted children by performing a ceremony attended by grieving women centering on Jizo Bosatsu, the bodhisattva whom Japanese Buddhists revere as a savior of souls from the hells and a protector of children." Author Sandy Boucher wrote, "She is most interested in the practice of lovingkindness and compassion, taught in a traditional setting and style." Hartman was also interested in interfaith dialogue and sat on the Board of World Religious Leaders for the Elijah Interfaith Institute.

== Writing ==
Hartman regularly contributed to publications like Lion's Roar (magazine) and Buddhadharma: The Practitioner's Quarterly. In the latter, she offered advice through the "Ask the Teachers" column for over a decade.

A short collection of her talks and teachings on the subject of boundlessness was compiled by Zenju Earthlyn Manuel into Seeds For A Boundless Life: Zen Teachings From The Heart, Hartman's first book, published in 2015.

== See also ==
- Buddhism in the United States
- Timeline of Zen Buddhism in the United States
