= Musha shugyō =

Samurai warrior pilgrimage

Musha shugyō
Japanese	武者修行
Hiragana	むしゃしゅぎょう
Revised Hepburn	musha shugyō
Kunrei-shiki	musya syugyô

Musha shugyō (武者修行, training in warriorship) is a samurai warrior's quest or pilgrimage. The concept is similar to the Chinese youxia, or knight errantry in feudal Europe. A warrior called a shugyōsha would wander the land practicing and honing his skills without the protection of his family or school. Possible activities include training with other schools, dueling, performing bodyguard or mercenary work, and searching for a daimyō to serve.

Musha shugyō was inspired by Zen monks, who would engage in similar ascetic wanderings (which they called angya, "travelling on foot") before attaining enlightenment.
