= Alan Senauke =

American poet (1947–2024)

Hozan Alan Senauke
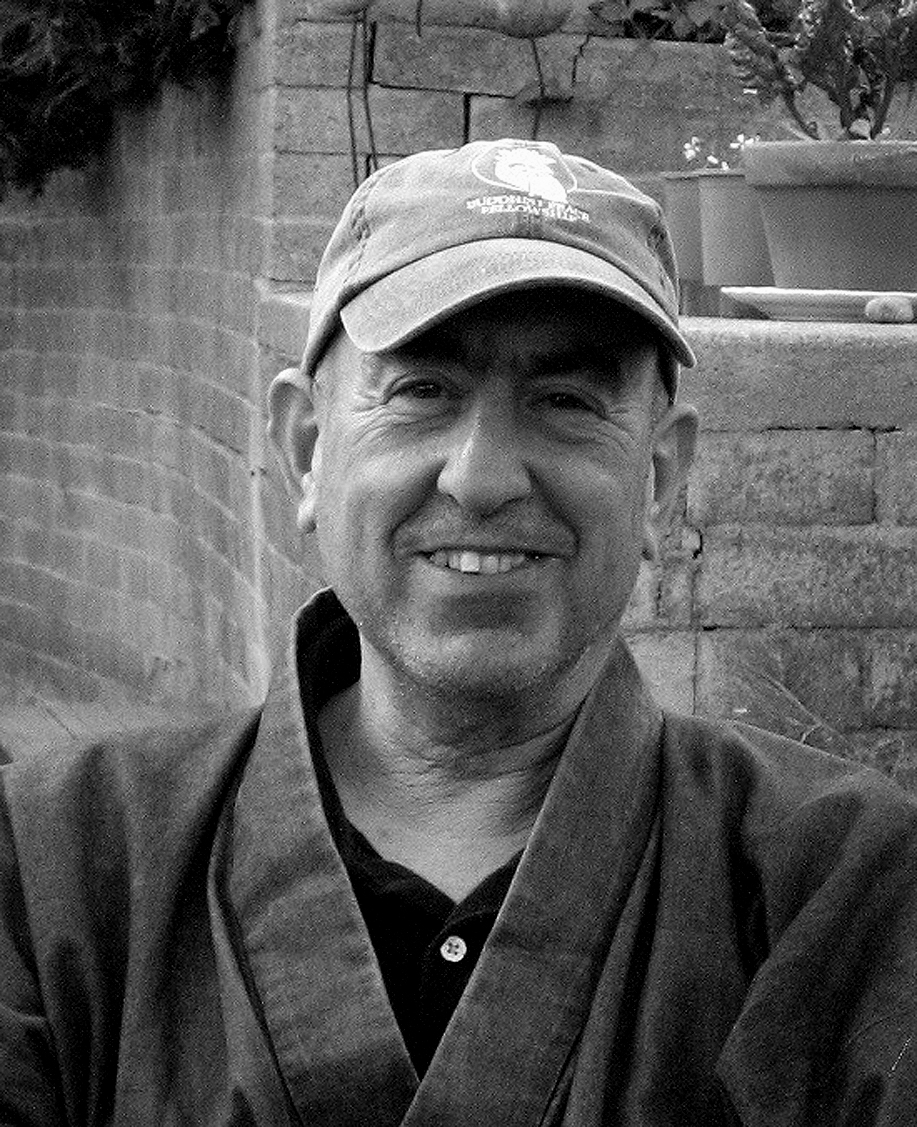
- Senauke in 2008
- Title: Priest; Vice Abbot (BZS)

Personal life
- Born: December 13, 1947 New York City, U.S.
- Died: December 22, 2024 (aged 77) Berkeley, California, U.S.
- Spouse: Laurie Senauke, Nancy Werner
- Children: Silvie; Alexander
- Education: Columbia University

Religious life
- Religion: Buddhism
- School: Sōtō

Senior posting
- Teacher: Mel Weitsman
- Based in: Berkeley Zen Center; Buddhist Peace Fellowship
- Website: www.berkeleyzencenter.org

Hozan Alan Senauke (December 13, 1947 – December 22, 2024) was an American Sōtō priest, folk musician and poet residing at the Berkeley Zen Center (BZC) in Berkeley, California, where he served as Abbot. He was an executive director of the Buddhist Peace Fellowship (BPF), holding that position from 1991 to 2001. Alan also was a founder of Think Sangha, a group of writers and intellectuals that are affiliated with the BPF and the International Network of Engaged Buddhists. Think Sangha is a group of individuals who meet together to identify some of the most pressing social issues that they feel engaged Buddhists should be addressing. Senauke, who was born to a secular Jewish family in Brooklyn, New York, arrived in the San Francisco Bay area in 1968 and soon started sitting at the Berkeley Zen Center. Along with his Dharma sister Maylie Scott, Senauke received Dharma transmission from his teacher Sojun Mel Weitsman in 1998 during a ceremony at Tassajara Zen Mountain Center.

== Biography ==
Alan Senauke was born in 1947 to a secular Jewish family in Brooklyn, New York. While attending Columbia University, Senauke participated in the Columbia University strike of April 1968. That same year he left for California, arriving in the San Francisco Bay area where he began sitting zazen at the Berkeley Zen Center. He became Executive Director of the Buddhist Peace Fellowship in 1991, a position in which he served until 2001 (though he remained active in the organization). Though he was a peace and civil rights activist of the 1960s and 1970s, by the 1980s Senauke had more or less allowed his activism to become an exercise in intellectualism. His becoming director of BPF, as well as the emergence of the Persian Gulf War, allowed Senauke's activist tendencies and Buddhist practice to merge. Together, he and his colleague Tova Green brought BPF to the forefront of American engaged Buddhism. Along with Green, Senauke helped the BPF "become a place in US society, and in the world, where the sources of violence could be contemplated. The debate on the Gulf War was vital to this development."

During the late 1990s, Senauke also was a founder of Think Sangha, a group of writers and intellectuals that are affiliated with the BPF and the International Network of Engaged Buddhists. In 1998 Senauke received shiho (or, Dharma transmission) from his teacher Sojun Mel Weitsman along with Maylie Scott at Tassajara Zen Mountain Center. Senauke was formerly a board member of Nevada Desert Experience, an organization that holds various retreats, protests and conferences on the subject of nuclear testing. He was also the founder of the Clear View Project, which focuses on social change and relief efforts in Asia, most recently in Burma (Myanmar). As a result of the recent uprisings in Burma and the subsequent repression by Burma's military junta, Senauke became increasingly involved in activism related to the cause of the Burmese people. In 2008 and early 2009, Alan made several trips to Burma along with other members of the Buddhist Peace Fellowship and visited communities and Buddhist temples affected by the repressive government.

Senauke was installed as Abbot of Berkeley Zen Center on January 31, 2021.

Alan was a member of the bluegrass ensemble Bluegrass Intentions with Suzy Thompson (fiddle, Cajun accordion, vocals), Eric Thompson (mandolin, guitar, vocals), Larry Cohea (bass, vocals), and Bill Evans (banjo, vocals). They released the 2002 album Old as Dirt on the Native and Fine record label. He was also a member of Cajun/Creole band the Midnite Ramblers. In the 1980s, he was a member of bluegrass band High Country and appeared on their 1987 album Blue Highway.

Senauke died at home in Berkeley on December 22, 2024, at the age of 77.

== Bibliography ==
- Senauke, Hozan Alan (2023). Turning Words. Shambhala, Boulder. OCLC 1328002575
- Senauke, Alan (2010). The Bodhisattva's embrace: dispatches from engaged Buddhism's front lines. Clear View Press, Berkeley. OCLC 673812978
- Senauke, Alan (2006). "A Long and Winding Road: Soto Zen Training in America". Teaching Theology and Religion. 9 (2). Blackwell Publishing: 127–132. doi:10.1111/j.1467-9647.2006.00274.x. OCLC 87681684.
- Senauke, Alan (1972). Mental Revenge. FITS Collective. OCLC 17186298.
- Senauke, Alan (1971). To My World. San Francisco. OCLC 32209387.
- Senauke, Alan (1968). Kansas Days: A Poem. Columbia Review Press. OCLC 3076826.

== Discography ==
- High Country, Blue Highway. Turquoise Records, 1987.
- Senauke, Alan; Kate Brislin; Jody Stecher; Suzy Thompson; Eric Thompson; Bill Evans (2002). Wooden Man: Old Songs from the Southern School. Native and Fine Records. OCLC 122931724.
- Alan Senauke, Everything is Broken: Songs about Things as they Are, 2012

== See also ==
- Buddhism in the United States
- Timeline of Zen Buddhism in the United States
- Nevada Desert Experience

== Sources ==
- Buddenbaum, Judith Mitchell; Mason, Debra L. (February 16, 2000). Readings on Religion as News. Blackwell Publishing. ISBN 0-8138-2926-7.
- Obenzinger, Hilton (December 2001). "Did You Write Any Poems?". Jacket magazine.
- O'Grady, John F.; Schüttke-Scherle, Peter; May, John D'Arcy (2007). Ecumenics From the Rim: Explorations in Honour of John D'Arcy May. Global. ISBN 978-3-8258-0637-8.
- Queen, Christopher S (2000). Engaged Buddhism in the West. Wisdom publications. ISBN 0-86171-159-9. OCLC 41951145.
- Wenger, Michael (2001). Wind Bell: Teachings from the San Francisco Zen Center (1968–2001). North Atlantic Books. ISBN 1-55643-381-6.
