= Edward Espe Brown =

Zen teacher and writer

Edward Espé Brown
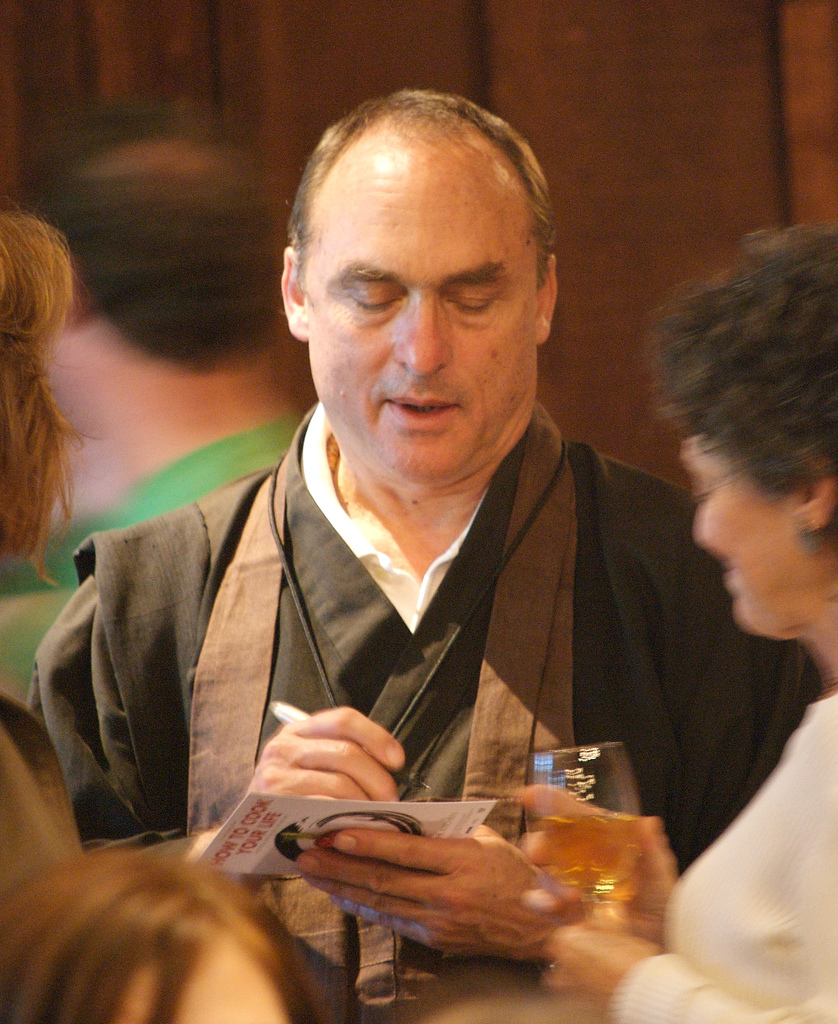

Personal life
- Born: March 24, 1945 (age 81)
- Website: www.peacefulseasangha.com

Religious life
- Religion: Zen Buddhism
- School: Sōtō
- Lineage: Shunryu Suzuki
- Dharma name: Jusan Kainei

Senior posting
- Teacher: Sojun Mel Weitsman

"Kainei" Edward Espé Brown (born March 24, 1945) is an American Zen teacher and writer. He is the author of The Tassajara Bread Book, written at the Tassajara Zen Mountain Center, as well as the co-author of The Greens Cookbook, with Deborah Madison.

== Early life ==
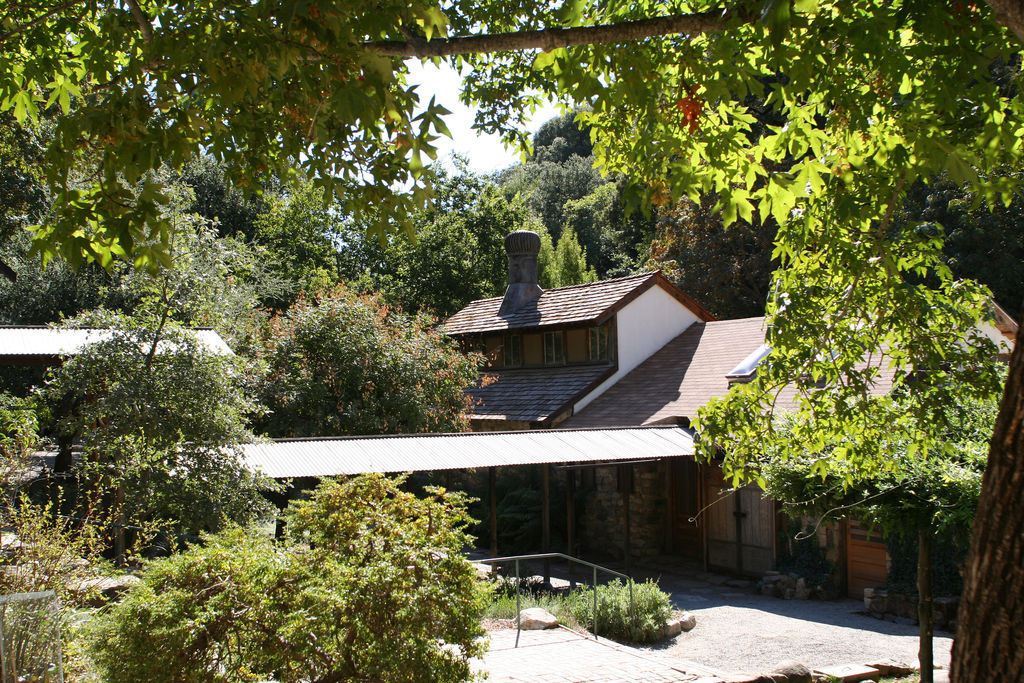
Kitchen at Tassajara, where Brown learned to bake bread

Brown's mother died when he was three years old. Three days after her death, his father decided to send Brown and his older brother Dwite to an orphanage in San Anselmo, California, because that was the only way he could visit them regularly (the alternative was to send the boys to live with relatives in South Dakota). Brown's father remarried four years later, and then the boys returned home.

In 1955, Dwite and Brown flew to Falls Church, Virginia to visit their aunt Alice. It was her homemade bread baking that inspired Brown, who called her bread "fabulously delicious". He wondered why other people weren't eating the same thing instead of "foamy white bread" bought in a store. Brown resolved to learn how to bake bread and to teach others how.

When he got home he asked his mother to teach him to bake bread. She said, "No, yeast makes me nervous." Brown eventually learned to bake bread, eleven years later, from two chefs at Tassajara. Brown later asked his brother if he remembered their trip to visit Alice. Dwite said yes he did, "What I remember was the Smithfield ham, but it didn't change my life".

== San Francisco ==
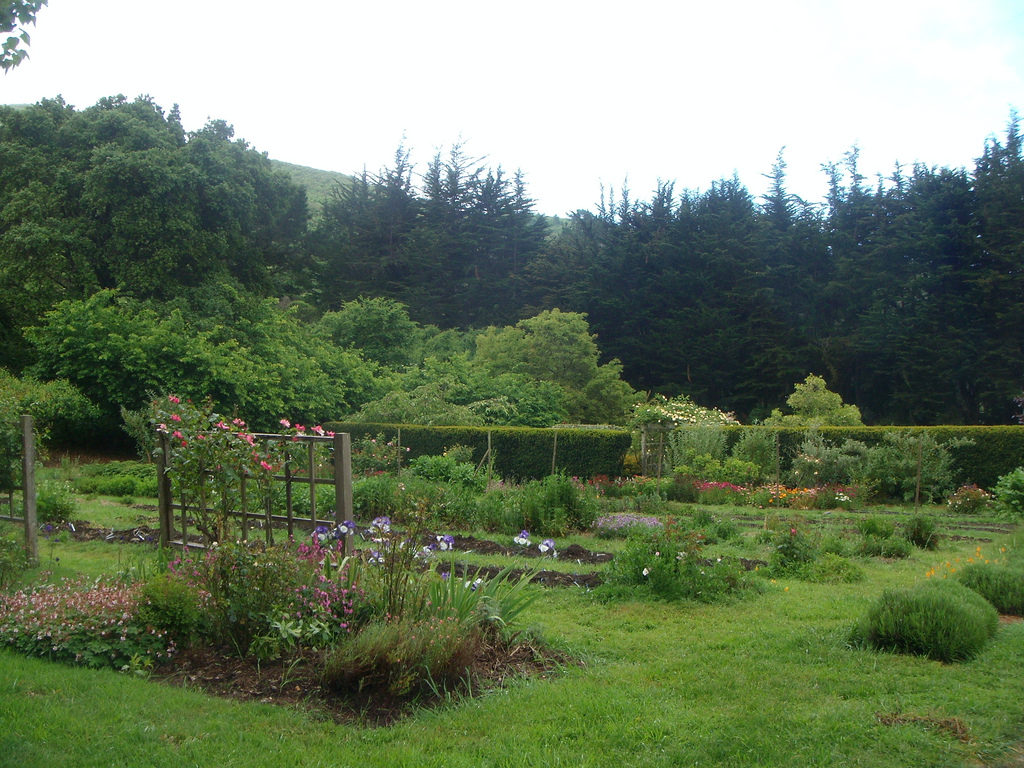
Green Gulch Farm Zen Center where Brown once lived

Brown wrote The Tassajara Bread Book in 1970 with a $100 advance from the publisher. As of 2003, 750,000 copies were in print, with 3,000 copies still selling every year. From the mid-1960s to the mid-'80s, Brown lived, cooked, taught or was a manager at the Tassajara Zen Mountain Center, Green Gulch Farm Zen Center and the San Francisco Zen Center.

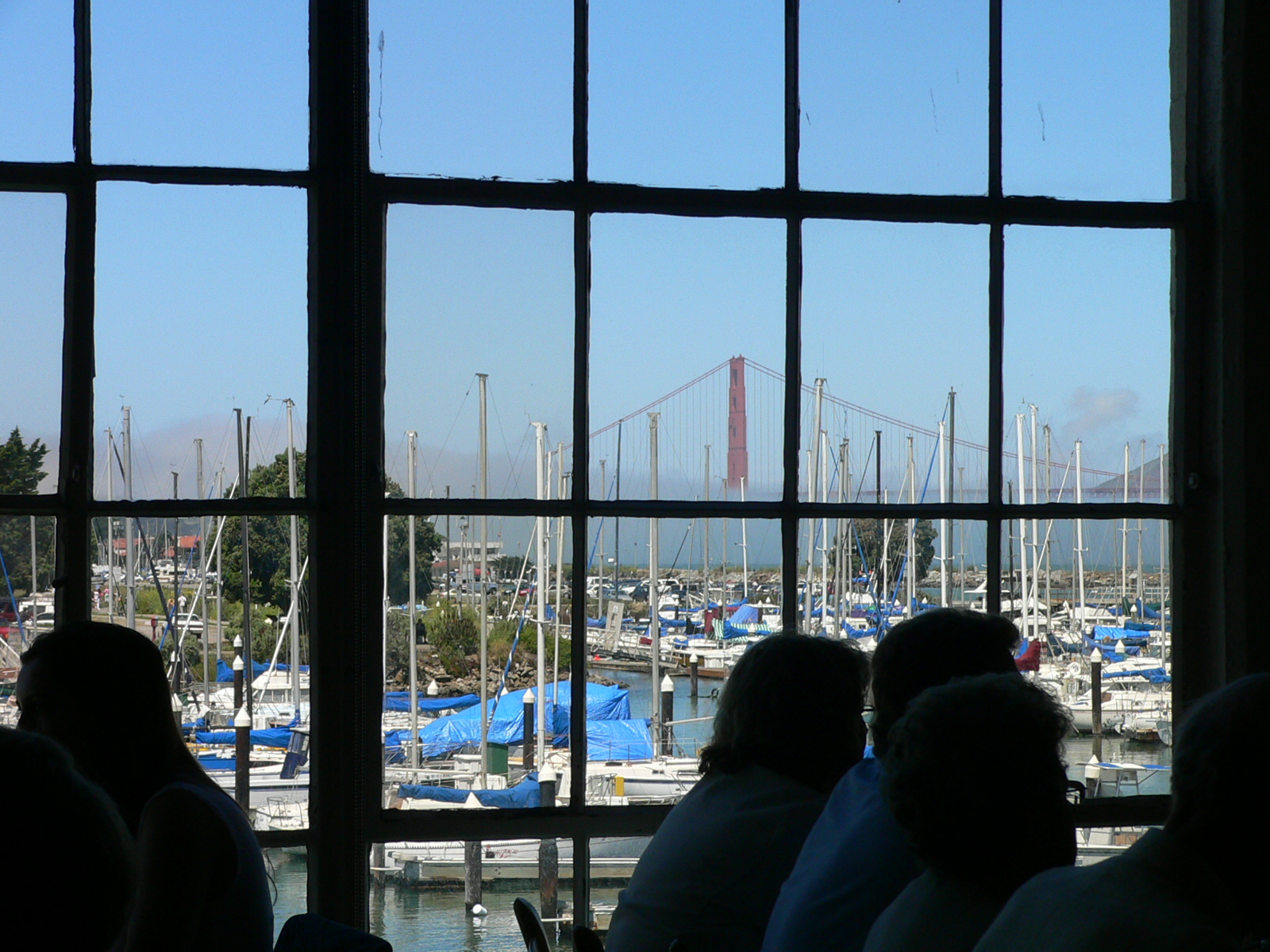
Golden Gate Bridge is part of the view from Greens Restaurant, which Brown helped to found

A Dharma heir of Sojun Mel Weitsman, in 1971, Brown was ordained as a Zen priest by Shunryu Suzuki, who gave him the Dharma name Jusan Kainei ("Longevity Mountain, Peaceful Sea"). He edited Suzuki's book Not Always So in 2002 after Suzuki's death in 1971.

Brown helped to found the vegetarian Greens Restaurant in San Francisco. He and founding chef Deborah Madison wrote the vegetarian cookbook, The Greens Cookbook in 1987.

== Later years ==
Brown leads the Peaceful Sea Sangha in Fairfax, Marin County, California and is a member of the Soto Zen Buddhist Association. Brown makes his living by teaching meditation in his home and by giving baking and cooking workshops at Zen centers in the United States, Canada and Austria. Brown tells his students that "every dough is different, just as every day is different". He also says that baking and living both come down to the same thing: "developing attention and awareness".

He combines zazen with qigong, yoga, and handwriting change, so that some critics call his teaching style "Zen Lite". Brown told Carol Ness, writing for the San Francisco Chronicle, "I'm not insistent on the forms. We're not all serious and sober. We sit and we talk."

Brown is the subject of the 2007 documentary film How to Cook Your Life by Doris Dörrie, in which he and Dörrie suggest embracing joy and spirit within food habits. "When you’re cooking, you’re not just cooking, you’re not just working on food...you’re also working on yourself, you’re working on other people." He also appears in Spiritual Revolution (2008), a less well-known film by Alan Swyer.

== Books ==
- The Tassajara Bread Book.(2011) [1970] Shambhala Publications. Written at the Tassajara Zen Mountain Center.
  - 1970 first edition: ISBN 0-87773-025-3, ISBN 978-0-87773-025-5.
  - 1995 25th anniversary edition: ISBN 1-57062-089-X, ISBN 978-1-57062-089-8.
- Tassajara Cooking. (1986) Shambhala Publications. ISBN 0-87773-344-9, ISBN 978-0-87773-344-7.
- Tomato Blessings and Radish Teachings: Recipes and Reflections. (1997) Riverhead Books. ISBN 1-57322-673-4, ISBN 978-1-57322-673-8.
- The Tassajara Recipe Book. (2000) Shambhala Publications. ISBN 1-57062-580-8, ISBN 978-1-57062-580-0.
- The Greens Cookbook, with Deborah Madison. (2001) Random House Broadway imprint. ISBN 0-7679-0823-6, ISBN 978-0-7679-0823-8.
- Not Always So: Practicing the True Spirit of Zen. Lectures by Shunryu Suzuki (2008) [2003] (ed.) HarperCollins. ISBN 0-06-095754-9, ISBN 978-0-06-095754-4.
- The Complete Tassajara Cookbook: Recipes, Techniques, and Reflections from the Famed Zen Kitchen Shambhala Publications. (2011). ISBN 978-1-59030-672-7
- No Recipe: Cooking as Spiritual Practice Sounds True (2018). ISBN 978-1683640547 ASIN B073ZVZR63
- Brown, Edward Espe; Parker, Danny S. (2019). The most important point : Zen teachings of Edward Espe Brown. Boulder, Colorado. ISBN 978-1-68364-160-5. OCLC 1042356769.

== See also ==
- Timeline of Zen Buddhism in the United States
