= Maylie Scott =

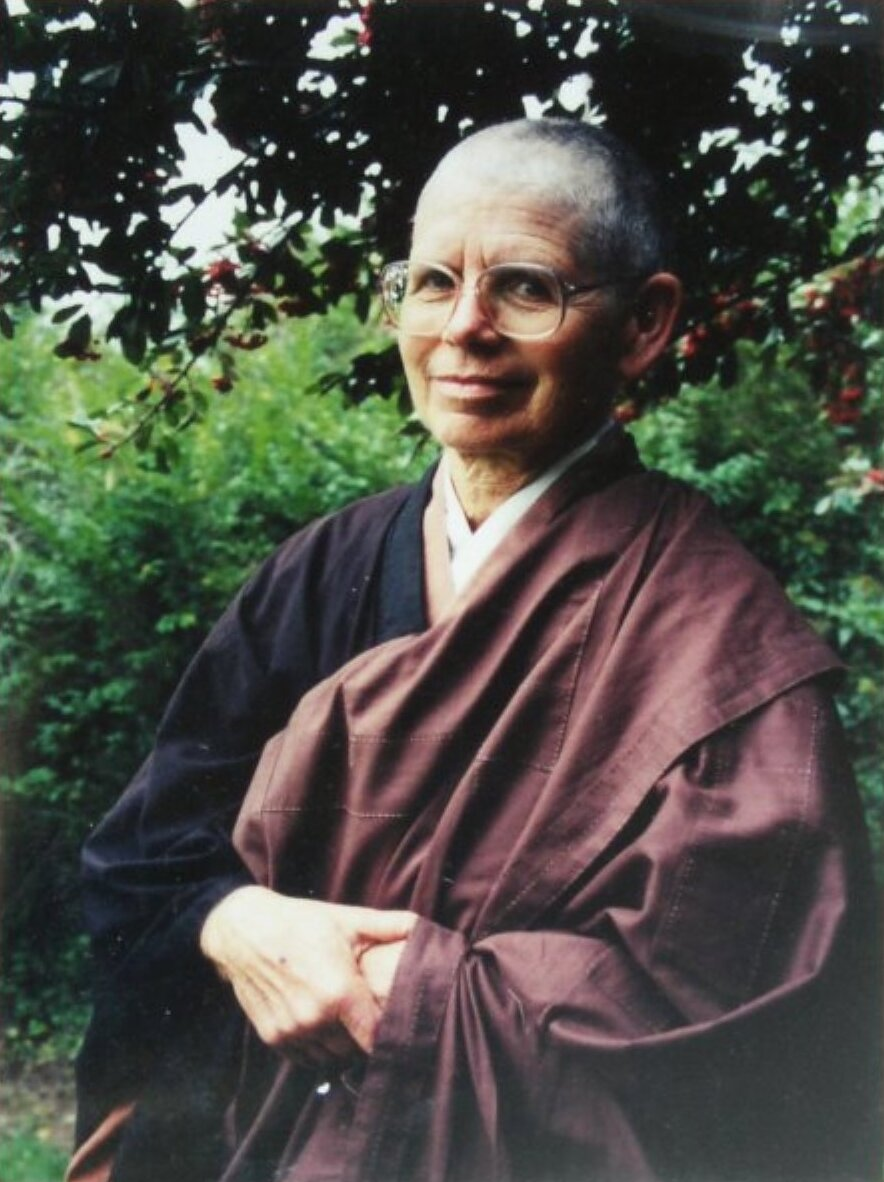
- Title: Roshi

Personal life
- Born: March 29, 1935
- Died: May 10, 2001 (aged 66) Arcata, California
- Education: Harvard University
- Other name: Kushin Seisho
- Occupation: social worker

Religious life
- Religion: Zen Buddhism
- School: Sōtō

Senior posting
- Teacher: Maurine Stuart; Mel Weitsman
- Based in: Rin Shin-ji; Berkeley Zen Center
- Predecessor: Sojun Mel Weitsman
- Website: http://www.arcatazengroup.org

Maylie Scott (March 29, 1935—May 10, 2001), Buddhist name Kushin Seisho, was a Sōtō roshi who received Dharma transmission from Sojun Mel Weitsman in 1998 at Tassajara Zen Mountain Center. She graduated from Harvard University in 1956 and obtained a master's degree in social work from the University of California, Berkeley. According to the book The Encyclopedia of Women and Religion in North America, "Maylie Scott described her primary teaching objective as empowering the sangha by making sure she is the facilitator, not the 'star.'" In addition to her occupation as a social worker, she was also on the Board of Directors for the Buddhist Peace Fellowship (BPF). In addition to serving for the BPF, Scott was also involved with the Buddhist Alliance for Social Engagement and frequently protested the import of weapons at the Concord Naval Weapons Station. A socially engaged Buddhist and teacher at the Berkeley Zen Center, Scott was known for her work in prisons and homeless shelters. Also, during the 1980s she studied under Maurine Stuart (a Rinzai roshi) and, in April 2000, she founded Rin Shin-ji (Forest Heart Temple) in Arcata, California. Professor Lloyd Fulton, of Humboldt State University, had once said of Scott that she is, "a strong-willed and organized woman."

== Gallery ==
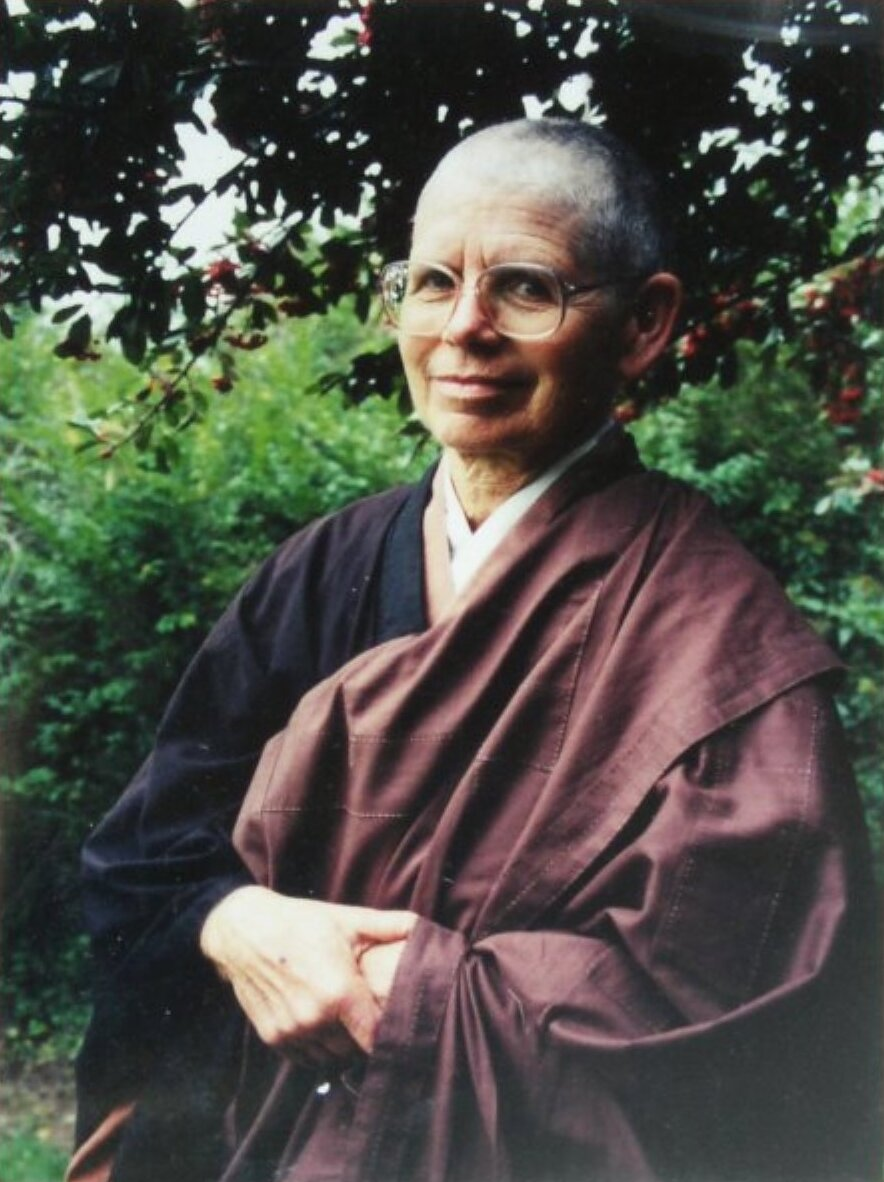

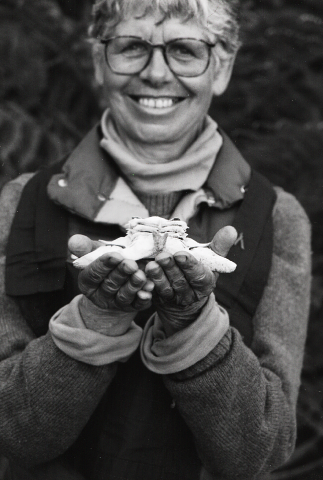

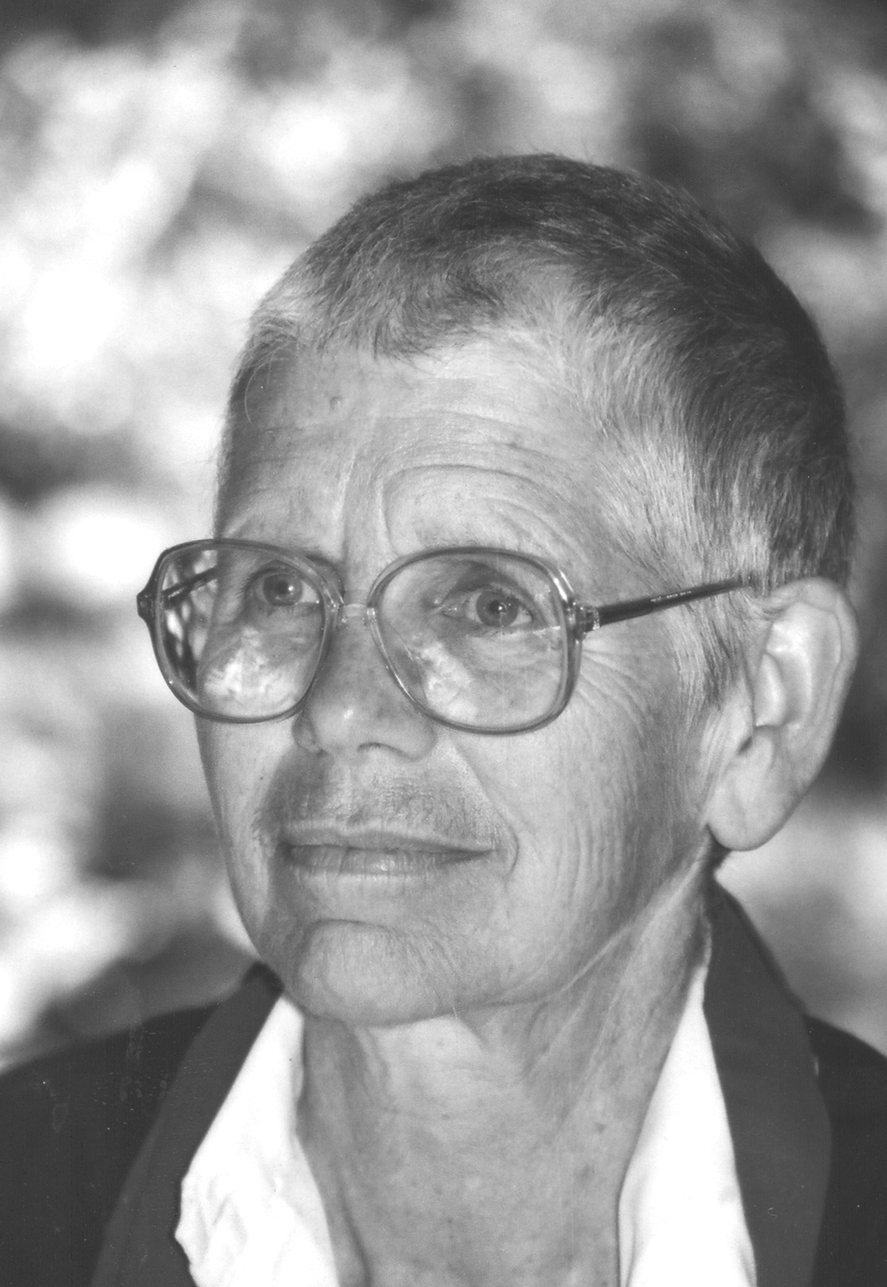

== See also ==
- Buddhism in the United States
- Hozan Alan Senauke
- Timeline of Zen Buddhism in the United States
