= Mel Weitsman =

American Zen Buddhist monk (1929–2021)

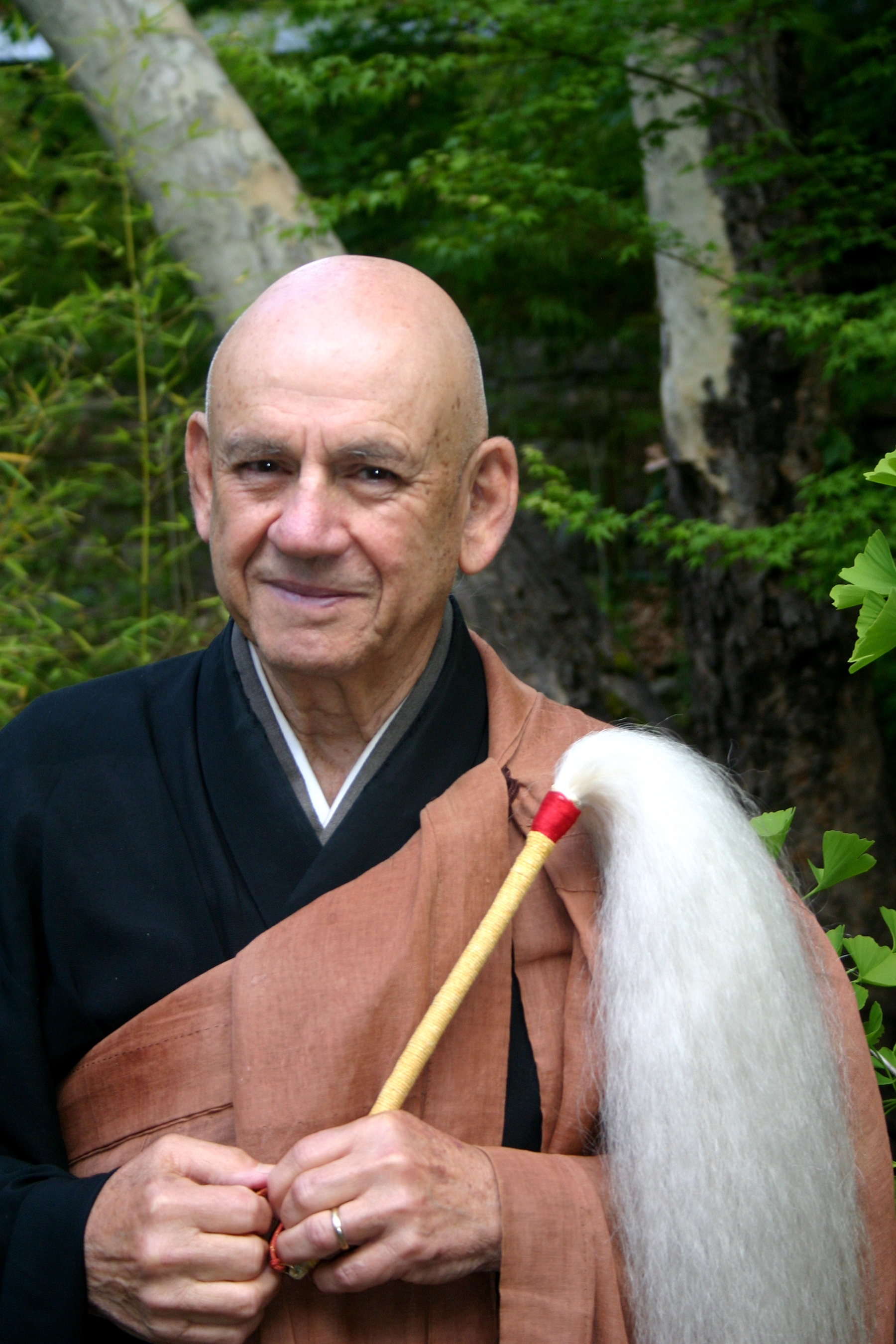
- Sojun Mel Weitsman wielding a hossu.
- Title: Abbot

Personal life
- Born: Mel Weitsman; July 20, 1929 Southern California, U.S.
- Died: January 7, 2021 (aged 91)

Religious life
- Religion: Zen Buddhism
- School: Sōtō
- Lineage: Shunryū Suzuki
- Dharma name: Hakuryū Sojun

Senior posting
- Teacher: Shunryū Suzuki
- Based in: Berkeley Zen Center
- Predecessor: Hoitsu Suzuki
- Successor: Zenkei Blanche Hartman; Zoketsu Norman Fischer; Ryushin Paul Haller; Peter Schneider (Zen priest); Hozan Alan Senauke; Maylie Scott; Josho Pat Phelan; Grace Schireson; Dairyu Michael Wenger; Myōgen Steve Stücky; Shōsan Victoria Austin; Steve Weintraub; Raul Moncayo; Gil Fronsdal; Fran Tribe; Mary Mocine; Myōan Grace Schireson; Daijaku Kinst; Shinshu Roberts; Teah Strozer; Chikudō Lew Richmond; Edward Espe Brown; Idilio Ceniceros

Hakuryu Sojun Mel Weitsman (July 20, 1929 – January 7, 2021), born Mel Weitsman, was an American Buddhist who was the founder, abbot and guiding teacher of Berkeley Zen Center located in Berkeley, California. Weitsman was a Sōtō Zen roshi practicing in the lineage of Shunryū Suzuki, having received Dharma transmission in 1984 from Suzuki's son Hoitsu. He was also a co-abbot of the San Francisco Zen Center, where he served from 1988 to 1997. Weitsman was also editor of the book Branching Streams Flow in the Darkness: Zen Talks on the Sandokai, based on talks given by Suzuki on the Sandokai.

== Biography ==
Mel Weitsman was born in southern California in 1929, to Edward Weitsman and Leah Rosenberg Weitsman. After exploring Jewish spirituality in his youth, he started practicing at the San Francisco Zen Center under Shunryū Suzuki in 1964. He co-founded the Berkeley Zen Center with his teacher in 1967. Suzuki ordained Weitsman as a priest in 1969, and arranged for him to be Shuso (Head Monk) in 1970 under Tatsugami Roshi at Tassajara Zen Mountain Center. His other teachers included Dainin Katagiri Roshi, Kōbun Chino Roshi, Ryogen Yoshimura and Kazuaki Tanahashi, with whom he has often worked on translations of Zen texts.

In 1984, Weitsman received Dharma transmission from Suzuki Roshi's son and Dharma Heir, Hoitsu Suzuki Roshi, Abbot of Rinso-In Temple in Yaizu, Japan. In 1985, he became Abbot of Berkeley Zen Center. From 1988 to 1997, he co-led San Francisco Zen Center with Tenshin Reb Anderson (its previous abbot, Zentatsu Richard Baker, stood accused of financial and sexual misconduct). In 1995, Weitsman co-founded the American Zen Teachers Association (AZTA) with senior American Dharma teachers Tetsugen Bernard Glassman, Dennis Genpo Merzel and Keido Les Kaye.

Weitsman entrusted the Dharma to over twenty individuals, including Zenkei Blanche Hartman (1988) and Zoketsu Norman Fischer (1988).

== Lineage ==
1. Josho Pat Phelan (?—present) (Note: Sweeping Zen, "Shunryu Suzuki lineage")
2. Mary Mocine (?—present)
3. Myoan Grace Schireson (born 1946)
  1. Jane Myokaku Schneider (?—present)
  2. Myosho Baika Andrea Pratt (born 1960)
4. Shinshu Roberts (?—present)
5. Daijaku Judith Kinst (?—present)
6. Soshin Teah Strozer (?—present)
7. Chikudo Lew Richmond (12/30/2002–present)

       Höshō Peter Coyote (1/23/2016-present)
             Kyosaku Richard Laubly (9/17/2023-present)
             Haku-un David Brazier (4/30/2025-present)

1. 2002 Peter Yozen Schneider (1937 - 2025)
2. Shosan Victoria Austin (?—present)
3. Dairyu Michael Wenger (born 1947)
  1. Darlene Su Rei Cohen (☸ 1942—2011)
    1. Susan Ji-On Postal (?—present)
      1. Myozan Dennis Keegan (?—present)
    2. Horyu Ryotan Cynthia Kear (?—present)
    3. Sarita Tamayo-Moraga (?—present)
  2. Mark Lancaster (?—present)
4. Hozan Alan Senauke (born 1947)
5. Maylie Scott (☸ 1935—2001)
6. Fran Tribe (☸)
7. Gil Fronsdal (born 1954)
8. Edward Espe Brown (born 1945)
9. Ryushin Paul Haller (born 1947)
10. Myogen Steve Stucky (?—2014)
11. Steve Weintraub (?—present)
12. Zoketsu Norman Fischer (born 1946)
  1. Do-An Robert Thomas (?—present)
  2. Shokan Jordan Thorn (?—present)
  3. Ingen Breen (?—present)
  4. Bruce Fortin (?—present)
  5. Arlene Lueck (?—present)
  6. Daigan Lueck (☸ ?—2015)
  7. Shinko Rick Slone (?—present)
  8. Gloria Ann Lee (?—present)
  9. Myphon Hunt (?—present) retired
  10. Gyokujun Teishin Layla Smith (born 1946)
13. Zenkei Blanche Hartman (?—present)
  1. Kosho McCall (born 1946)
  2. Seirin Barbara Kohn (?—present) retired
  3. Gengetsu Jana Drakka (born 1952)
  4. John Daniel King (☸ 1935—2001)
  5. Ryumon Hilda Guitierrez Baldoquin (?—present)

== See also ==
- Buddhism in the United States
- Soto Zen Buddhist Association
- Timeline of Zen Buddhism in the United States
- Zen in the United States

== Sources ==
- Ford, James Ishmael (2006). Zen Master Who?: A Guide to the People and Stories of Zen. Wisdom Publications. ISBN 0-86171-509-8.
- Downing, Michael (2002). Shoes Outside the Door: Desire, Devotion, and Excess at San Francisco Zen Center. Counterpoint. ISBN 1-58243-254-6.
- Gach, Gary (1998). What Book!?: Buddha Poems from Beat to Hiphop. Parallax Press. ISBN 0-938077-92-9.
- Prebish, Charles S.; Kenneth Kenʼichi Tanaka (1998). The Faces of Buddhism in America. University of California Press. ISBN 0-520-21301-7. OCLC 37782936.
- Skinner Keller, Rosemary; Rosemary Radford Ruether; Marie Cantlon (2006). The Encyclopedia of Women and Religion in North America. Indiana University Press. ISBN 0-253-34685-1. OCLC 61711172.
- "Lineage, San Francisco Zen Center: About Us". San Francisco Zen Center. Archived from the original on October 14, 2010.
