= Reb Anderson =

American Zen teacher

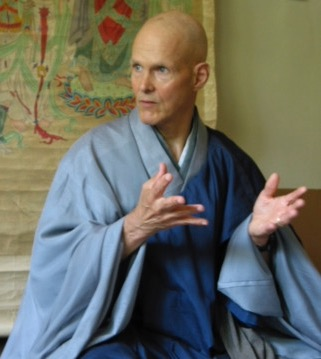
- Anderson in 2007
- Title: Zen Master

Personal life
- Born: Harold Anderson; 1943 (age 82–83) Mississippi, U.S.
- Website: www.rebanderson.org

Religious life
- Religion: Buddhism
- School: Soto Zen
- Lineage: Shunryu Suzuki
- Dharma name: Tenshin Zenki

Senior posting
- Based in: San Francisco Zen Center; Green Gulch Farm Zen Center
- Predecessor: Zentatsu Richard Baker
- Successor: Ananda Claude Dalenberg, Zengyu Paul Discoe, Sobun Katherine Thanas, Chikudo Jerome Petersen, Jiko Linda Cutts, Jakujo Gary McNabb, Furyu Nancy Schroeder, Myo Lahey, Taigen Dan Leighton, Meiya Wender, Leslie James, Setsuan Gaelyn Godwin, Kiku Christina Lehnherr, Taiyo Lipscomb, Kōkyō Henkel, Gentaku Susan O'Connell, Korin Nyuyu Charlie Porkorny, Shingan Thiemo Blank

Tenshin Zenki Reb Anderson (born 1943) is an American Zen Buddhist teacher in the Sōtō Zen lineage of Shunryu Suzuki. He is a senior dharma teacher at the San Francisco Zen Center and at Green Gulch Farm Zen Center in Marin County, California, where he lived for many years. According to author James Ishmael Ford, "Reb Anderson is one of the most prominent of contemporary Western Zen teachers."

== Biography ==
Reb Anderson was born as Harold Anderson in Mississippi in 1943 and grew up in Minnesota. His father left the family when Anderson was eleven. In his youth, he was a Golden Gloves boxer. Anderson developed an interest in Buddhism while still in his teens. In 1967, he abandoned his graduate studies in psychology and mathematics to study Soto Zen under Shunryu Suzuki at the San Francisco Zen Center.

Anderson was then ordained as a priest in 1970 by Suzuki, who gave Anderson the Buddhist name Tenshin Zenki 天眞全機 (Naturally Real, The Whole Works). After Suzuki Roshi's death, Anderson continued his training and practice at San Francisco Zen Center. In 1983 Anderson received shiho from Zentatsu Richard Baker, becoming Baker's first Dharma heir. However, when Baker was forced to resign amid complaints about his affairs with female Zen Center members and his purchase of expensive luxury goods, Baker claimed Anderson never completed the entire transmission ceremony. The board of the San Francisco Zen Center disagreed, understanding Anderson to be Baker's Dharma heir (Baker has since agreed with this.). After Baker's resignation, Anderson replaced him as abbot.

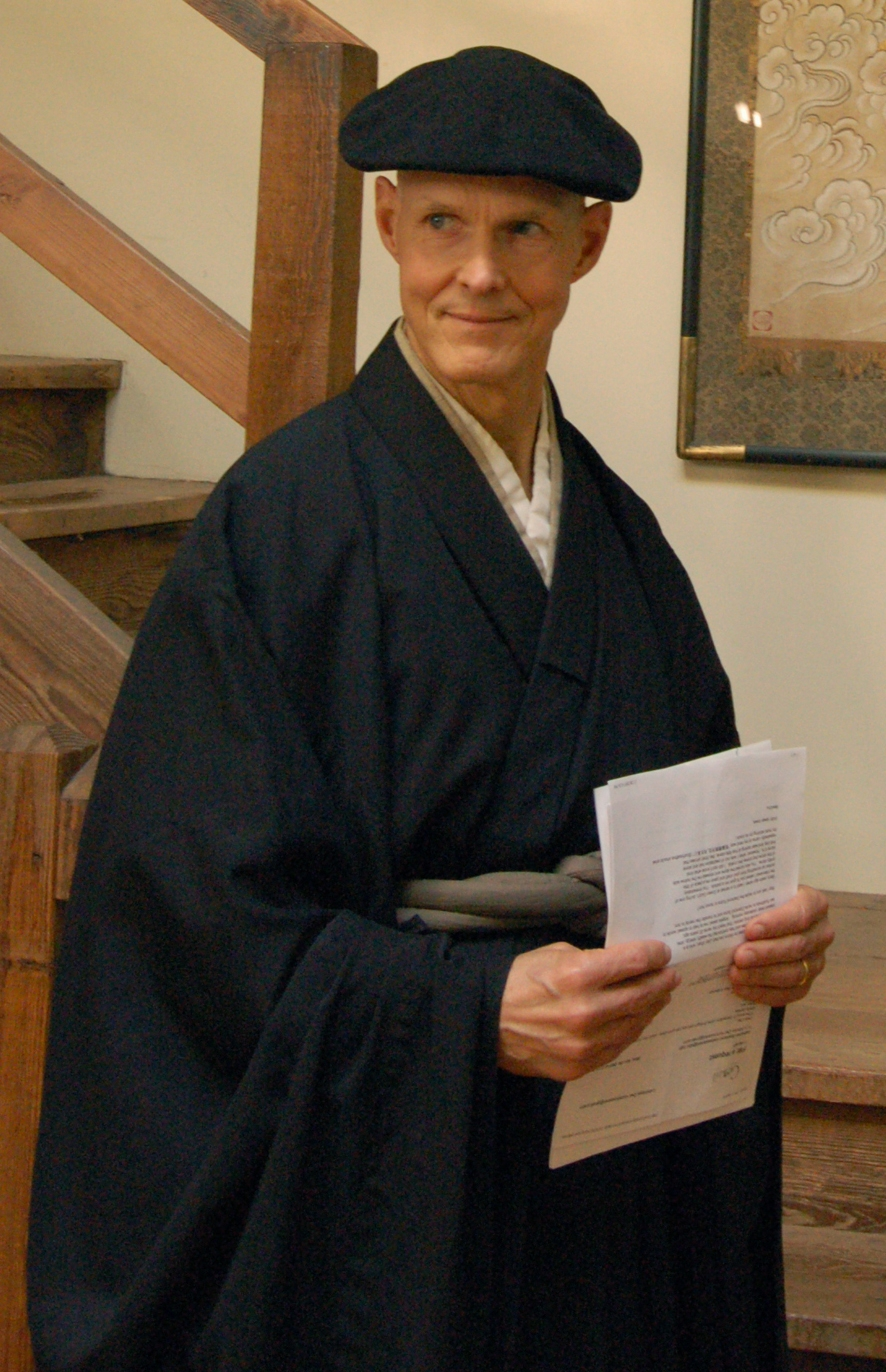
Tenshin Reb Anderson

In a controversial incident, which Anderson discusses in his book Being Upright: Zen Meditation and the Bodhisattva Precepts, while jogging in Golden Gate Park in 1983, he found the corpse of a man with a bullet wound to the head and a revolver nearby. Anderson returned to the body over a period of several days to meditate over the corpse. He eventually reported the body, but not the revolver, taking it into his possession. In 1987, Anderson was mugged one block away from the San Francisco Zen Center. He retrieved the unloaded revolver and chased the perpetrator to a nearby tenement, where both were quickly arrested.

The Zen Center Board of Directors sent him on a leave of absence for six months. After his return, he served as co-abbot with Mel Weitsman until 1995. Regarding this ordeal, Anderson has written of his remorse and insight garnered from the experience.

Anderson served as abbot and as co-abbot with Sojun Mel Weitsman of SFZC’s three training centers (City Center, Green Gulch Farm, and Tassajara Zen Mountain Center) from 1986 to 1995.

In October 1999 Anderson suffered a heart attack while conducting dokusan. He later underwent a successful emergency angioplasty.

Anderson is married to Rusa Chiu, a Jungian analyst. He has two daughters, Deborah Savran and Thea Anderson, as well as four grandchildren. Anderson retired in 2025 from San Francisco Zen Center but he continues to offer teachings and practice opportunities at No Abode Hermitage.

== Teaching style ==
According to James Ishmael Ford, "...Anderson Roshi is one of the first people to have worked hard to bring Dogen studies West. He has also stretched much of Zen's traditional approach to psychology by drawing upon other ancient Buddhist sources, including Abhidharma and Yogachara teaching, while at the same time being solidly informed regarding Western approaches to the discipline." To some students, "...Reb's practice invites comparison to the legendary Japanese samurai, the warriors who trained in medieval Zen monasteries."

== Dharma heirs ==
Sobun Katherine Thanas received shiho from Tenshin Roshi in 1988 and later was installed as abbess of the Santa Cruz Zen Center. Zengyu Paul Discoe, Chikudo Jerome Peterson and Ananda Claude Dalenburg also received shiho in 1988 (Ananda was the inspiration for the character Bud Diefendorf in Jack Kerouac's novel The Dharma Bums). Anderson gave shiho to his student Jiko Linda Cutts in 1996, who went on to serve as co-abbess of the San Francisco Zen Center from 2000 until 2007. She has served as Central Abbess of San Francisco Center from 2014 to 2019. Jakujo Gary McNabb received shiho in 1998. Furyu Nancy Schroeder received shiho 1999. She was installed as the abiding abbess of Green Gulch Farm Zen Center, seving from 2014 to 2023. Myo Denis Lahey received shiho in 1999 and became head teacher of the Hartford Street Zen Center, Issan-ji, in San Francisco. In 2000 Taigen Dan Leighton received shiho. Leighton has since gone on to establish the Mountain Source Sangha and, after moving to Chicago, Ancient Dragon Zen Gate. In 2002 Meiya Wender received shiho. She now conducts japanese tea ceremony classes at Green Gulch. Also in 2002, Anderson gave shiho to Leslie James, his first dharma entrustment to a lay teacher. She is a long-time resident of Tassajara Zen Mountain Center, the monastic center of San Francisco Zen Center. In 2003 Setsuan Gaelyn Godwin became Tenshin Roshi's Dharma successor and became Houston Zen Center's Abiding Teacher (2003) and abbot of Houston Zen Center in 2012. In 2005, she received the title of 'Kaikyoshi' from the Soto School of Japan. In 2005 Kiku Christina Lehnherr received shiho from Tenshin Roshi and served as San Francisco Zen Center's City Center abbess from 2012 to 2014. Taiyo Lipscomb received shiho in 2009, and in 2010, Kōkyō Henkel received shiho. Gentaku Susan O'Connell received shiho June 2017, Korin Nyuyu Charlie Pokorny received shiho in 2018. He is currently teaching at Brooklyn Zen Center. Shingan Sokei Thiemo Blank received shiho in 2025.

== Bibliography ==
- Anderson, Reb (2005) [1995]. Warm Smiles from Cold Mountains: Dharma Talks on Zen Meditation. Foreword by Susan Moon (3rd ed.). Berkeley: Rodmell Press. ISBN 1930485107. OCLC 61332243.
- Anderson, Reb (2001). Being Upright: Zen Meditation and the Bodhisattva Precepts. Berkeley: Rodmell Press. ISBN 0962713899. OCLC 44414111.
- Anderson, Reb (2012). The Third Turning of the Wheel: Wisdom of the Samdhinirmocana Sutra. Berkeley: Rodmell Press. ISBN 978-1930485310. OCLC 757477313.
- Anderson, Reb (2019). Entering the Mind of Buddha: Zen and the Six Heroic Practices of Bodhisattvas. Boulder: Shambhala Publications. ISBN 9781611806533. OCLC 1134538104.
- Anderson, Reb (2026). Nothing to Attain: Zen Stories of Faith and Understanding. Boulder: Shambhala Publications. ISBN 9781645474272. OCLC 2025017805.

== Audio and video ==
- Anderson, Reb (1993) [1984]. Basic Points of Buddhist Meditation. Tiburon, CA: Big Sur Tapes; Produced by Dolphin Tapes. OCLC 30066463.
- Engage Wisdom: "The Reb Anderson Audio Archive". https://rebanderson.engagewisdom.com/
- "Video Talks". Reb Anderson.

== See also ==
- Buddhism in the United States
- Timeline of Zen Buddhism in the United States
