= Angya =

Term used in Zen Buddhism

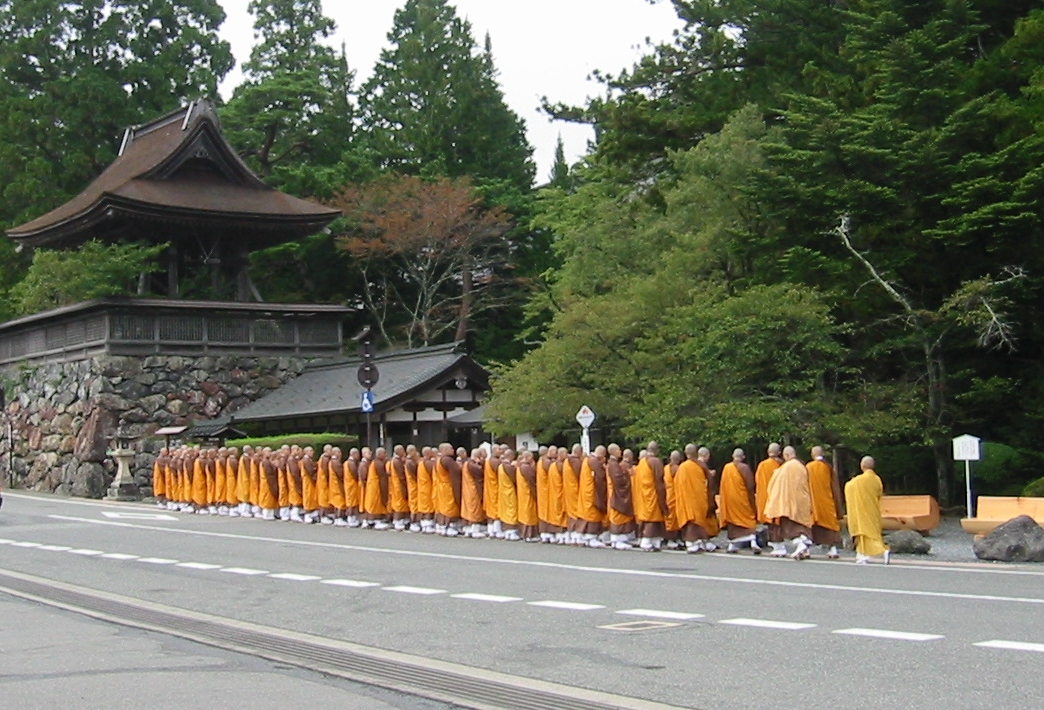
Angya Buddhist monk

Angya (行脚) is a term used in Zen Buddhism in reference to the traditional pilgrimage a monk or nun makes from monastery to monastery, literally translated as "to go on foot." The term also applies to the modern practice in Japan of an unsui (novice monk) journeying to seek admittance into a monastery for the first time. These unsui traditionally wear and/or carry a kasa, white cotton leggings, straw sandals, a kesa, a satchel, razor, begging bowls (hachi) and straw raincoat. When arriving the novice typically proffers an introductory letter and then must wait for acceptance for a period of days called tangaryō. Upon admittance he undergoes a probationary period known as tanga-zume. Considered an aspect of the early monk's training, angya had in ancient times lasted for many years for some. For instance, Bankei Yōtaku undertook a four-year angya upon leaving Zuiō-ji in 1641.

== See also ==
- Tangaryō
- Tanga-zume
