= Unsui =

Term in Zen Buddhism

Unsui (Japanese: 雲水), or kōun ryūsui (行雲流水) in full, is a term specific to Zen Buddhism which denotes a postulant awaiting acceptance into a monastery or a novice monk who has undertaken Zen training. Sometimes they will travel from monastery to monastery (angya) on a pilgrimage to find the appropriate Zen master with which to study.

== Etymology ==
The term unsui, which literally translates as "cloud, water" comes from a Chinese poem which reads, "To drift like clouds and flow like water." Helen J. Baroni writes, "The term can be applied more broadly for any practitioner of Zen, since followers of Zen attempt to move freely through life, without the constraints and limitations of attachment, like free-floating clouds or flowing water." According to author James Ishmael Ford, "In Japan, one receives unsui ordination at the beginning of formal ordained practice, and this is often perceived as 'novice ordination.'"

According to the Oxford Dictionary of Buddhism, the term unsui is also used for

Ch'an or zen monks who, having achieved enlightenment (satori) after an initial period of training under their first master, take to the road in search of other masters. This is done in order to either test their awakening against them or deepen it with them. The term refers to their lack of a fixed abode during this period."

Therefore, the translation of itinerant monk found on several Japanese-English online dictionaries.

== See also ==
- Bhikkhu
- Bhikkhuni
- Buddhism in Japan
- Samanera
