= James Ishmael Ford =

American Buddhist monk

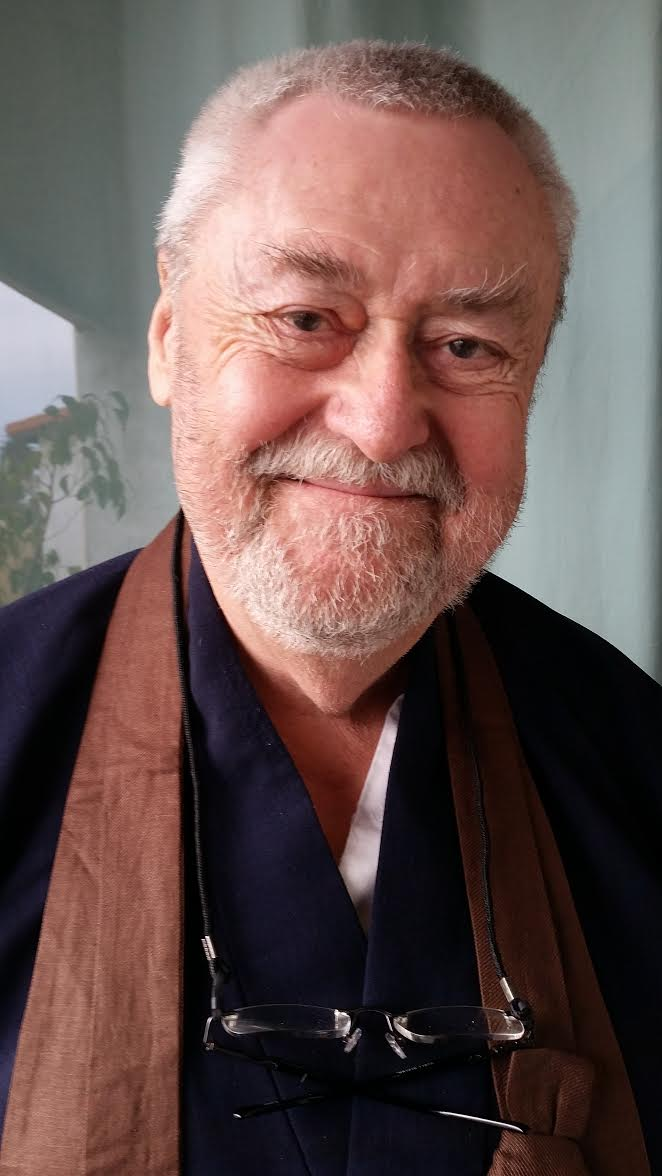
- Born: July 17, 1948 (age 78); Oakland, California
- Education: BA, Sonoma State University; M.Div. and MA, Pacific School of Religion
- Occupations: Zen Buddhist priest and Unitarian Universalist minister
- Spouse: Jan Seymour-Ford

James Ishmael Ford (Zeno Myoun, Roshi) is an American Zen Buddhist priest and a retired Unitarian Universalist minister. He was born in Oakland, California on July 17, 1948. He earned a BA in psychology from Sonoma State University, as well as an M.Div. and an MA in the Philosophy of Religion, both from the Pacific School of Religion.

== Biography ==
Ford began his Zen studies in 1968 at the Berkeley Zen Center under the direction of Mel Weitsman, later Weitsman, Roshi. He was ordained unsui and received Dharma transmission from the late Jiyu Kennett Roshi. After leaving Kennett Roshi's Shasta Abbey and for a brief time exploring other religious traditions including the Episcopal Church, the western Gnostic tradition and Inayat Khan Sufism, Ford pursued Zen koan introspection for nearly twenty years in the Sanbo Kyodan tradition with John Tarrant Roshi, with whom he completed formal training and from whom he received Inka Shomei (formal recognition as an authorized Zen teacher) in 2005.

Ford began to be seriously involved in Unitarian Universalism at about the same time he began his work with Tarrant Roshi. After completing theological studies he became a Unitarian Universalist minister, serving Unitarian Universalist congregations in Wisconsin and Arizona before becoming senior minister of the First Unitarian Society in Newton, MA in 2000. In May 2008 First Unitarian Church of Providence, RI called him to its pulpit; he began his ministry there in the summer of that year.

Roshi Ford also maintained his relationships within the Soto community, and in 2004 Ford participated in the first Dharma Heritage ceremony of the North American Soto Zen Buddhist Association. Ford, a past president of the Unitarian Universalist Buddhist Fellowship, was the first Unitarian Universalist minister to be named a Zen master.

Roshi Ford is part of the establishment of Zen in North America. He is the co-founder and first abbot of Boundless Way Zen, a network of meditation groups mostly in eastern Massachusetts. He was also influential in the development of the Buddhist Temple of Toledo in Ohio.

In 2015, Ford retired from his ministry at the First Unitarian Church of Providence, left Boundless Way, and moved to Long Beach, California. He then established the Empty Moon Zen Network, a network of Zen Centers in California, Washington state, and Pennsylvania.

In 2020 he started serving as consulting minister to the historic First Unitarian Church of Los Angeles.

Ford is a member of the American Zen Teachers Association and served on its membership committee for a decade. He maintains connections with the Unitarian Universalist community through his work with their Society for Community Ministries and Spiritual Director’s Network.

Roshi Ford has nine Dharma heirs including Josh Jiun Bartok Roshi (suspended as teacher from Greater Boston Zen Center in 2020 for sexual misconduct and in 2021 suspended from Soto Zen Buddhist Association for ethical violations, is no longer teaching Zen); Melissa Myozen Blacker Roshi of Boundless Way Temple; Dosho Port (suspended indefinitely from Soto Zen Buddhist Association in 2022 for ethical violations); and Jay Rinsen Weik Roshi of the Buddhist Temple of Toledo, Ohio.

== Bibliography ==
- James Ishmael Ford; Dan O'Neal; Alice Blair Wesley (1995). The Transient and Permanent in Liberal Religion: Reflections from the Uuma Convocation on Ministry. Skinner House Books. ISBN 978-1-55896-330-6.
- James Ishmael Ford (1996). This Very Moment : A Brief Introduction to Buddhism and Zen for Unitarian Universalists. Skinner House Books. ISBN 1-55896-347-2.
- James Ishmael Ford (2006). Zen Master Who?: A Guide to the People and Stories of Zen. Wisdom Publications. ISBN 0-86171-509-8.
- James Ishmael Ford; Melissa Myozen Blacker (2011). The Book of Mu: Essential Writings on Zen's Most Important Koan. Wisdom Publications. ISBN 978-0-86171-643-2.
- James Ishmael Ford (2012). If You're Lucky, Your Heart Will Break: Field Notes from a Zen Life. Wisdom Publications. ISBN 978-1-61429-039-1.
- James Ishmael Ford (2018). Introduction to Zen Koans: Learning the Language of Dragons. Wisdom Publications. ISBN 978-1-61429-295-1.
- James Ishmael Ford (2024). The Intimate Way of Zen: Effort, Surrender, and Awakening on the Spiritual Journey. Shambhala Publications. ISBN 978-1-64547-218-6.
- James Ishmael Ford (2025). Zen at the End of Religion: An Introduction for the Curious, the Skeptical, and the Spiritual but Not Religious. Monkfish Book Publishing. ISBN 978-1-958972762.
