= Sandy Boucher =

American writer

Sandy Boucher is an American writer, Buddhist, and feminist. She lives in Oakland, California.

== Life and career ==
Boucher received a master's degree from the Graduate Theological Union in Berkeley, California. Her degree was in the history and phenomenology of religion. For a time, she was a Buddhist nun in Sri Lanka. Boucher has been a contributor to the publications Tricycle: The Buddhist Review and Lion's Roar, along with publishing articles in the San Francisco Chronicle, The Sun, and Writer's Digest. In 1975, Boucher was a fellow at MacDowell Colony, an artists' colony in Peterborough, New Hampshire.

Sandy died at her home in Walnut Creek, CA on July 18, 2026.

== Published books ==
- Assaults & Rituals: Stories (1975)
- The Notebooks of Leni Clare, and Other Short Stories (The Crossing Press feminist series) (1982)
- Heartwomen: An Urban Feminist's Odyssey Home (1982)
- Turning the Wheel: American Women Creating the New Buddhism (1993)
- Opening the Lotus: A Woman's Guide to Buddhism (1997)
- Discovering Kwan Yin: Buddhist Goddess of Compassion (1999)
- Hidden Spring: A Buddhist Woman Confronts Cancer (2000)
- Dancing in the Dharma: The Life and Teachings of Ruth Denison (2005)
