= Shunryū Suzuki =

Japanese Buddhist monk who popularized Zen in the US

Shunryu Suzuki
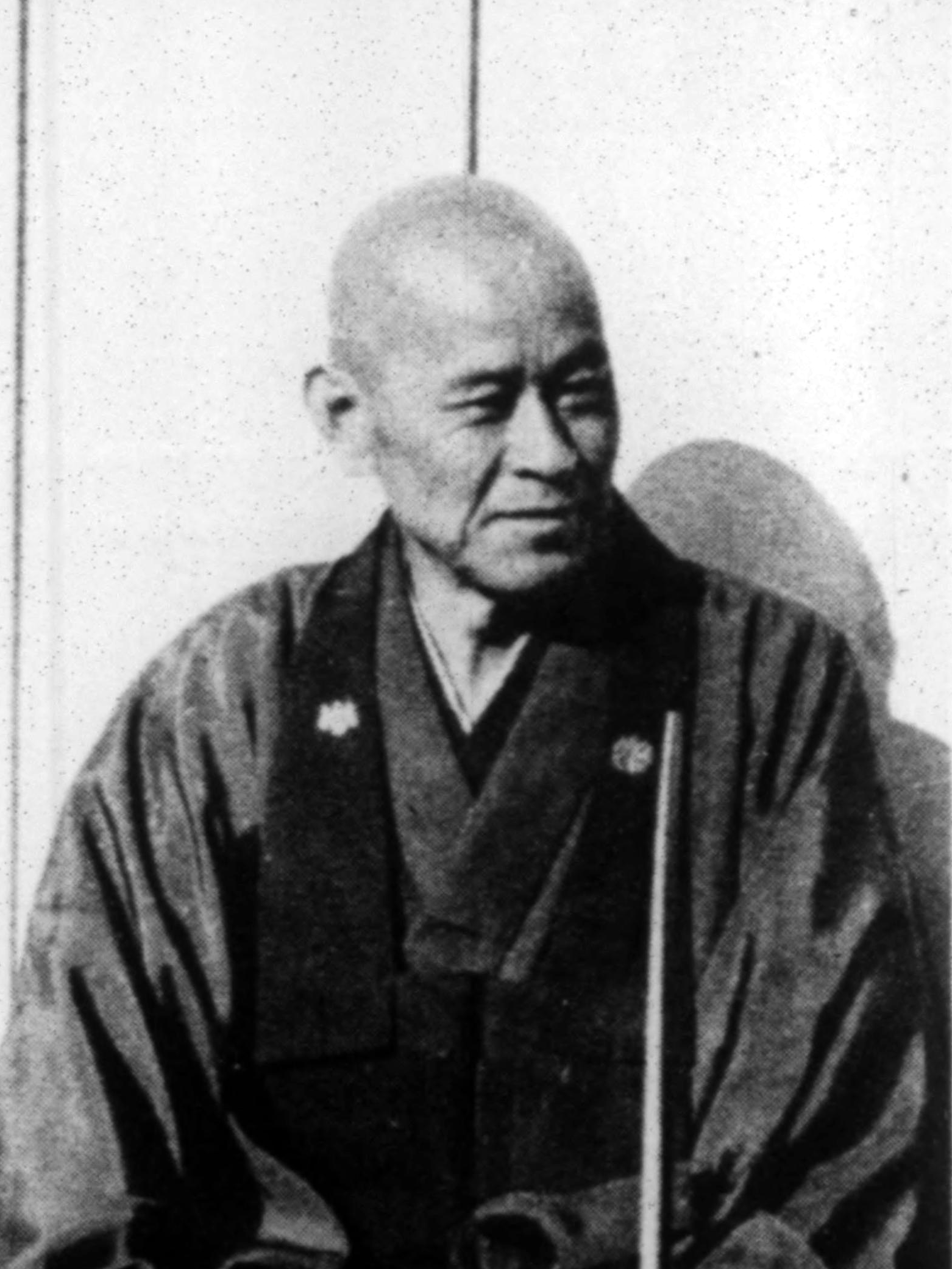
- Suzuki in 1969
- Title: Roshi

Personal life
- Born: May 18, 1904 Kanagawa Prefecture, Japan
- Died: December 4, 1971 (aged 67) San Francisco
- Spouse: Mitsu Suzuki

Religious life
- Religion: Buddhism
- School: Sōtō

Senior posting
- Successor: Suzuki Hoitsu, Zentatsu Richard Baker

Shunryu Suzuki (鈴木 俊隆 Suzuki Shunryū, dharma name Shōgaku Shunryū 祥岳俊隆, often called Suzuki Roshi; May 18, 1904 – December 4, 1971) was a Sōtō Zen monk and teacher who helped popularize Zen Buddhism in the United States, and is renowned for founding the first Zen Buddhist monastery outside Asia (Tassajara Zen Mountain Center). Suzuki founded San Francisco Zen Center which, along with its affiliate temples, comprises one of the most influential Zen organizations in the United States. A book of his teachings, Zen Mind, Beginner's Mind, is one of the most popular books on Zen and Buddhism in the West.

== Biography ==
Shunryu Suzuki was born May 18, 1904, in Kanagawa Prefecture southwest of Tokyo, Japan. His father, Butsumon Sogaku Suzuki, was the abbot of the village Soto Zen temple. His mother, Yone, was the daughter of a priest and had been divorced from her first husband for being too independent. Shunryu grew up with an older half-brother from his mother's first marriage and two younger sisters. As an adult he was about 4 feet 11 inches (1.5 m) tall.

His father's temple, Shōgan-ji, was located near Hiratsuka, a city on Sagami Bay about fifty miles southwest of Tokyo. The temple income was small and the family had to be very thrifty.

In 1916, 12-year-old Suzuki decided to train with a disciple of his father, Gyokujun So-on Suzuki. So-on was Sogaku's adopted son and abbot of Sogaku's former temple Zoun-in. His parents initially thought he was too young to live far from home but eventually allowed it.

Zoun-in is in a small village called Mori, Shizuoka in Japan. Suzuki arrived during a 100-day practice period at the temple and was the youngest student there. Zoun-in was a larger temple than Shōgan-ji.

At 4:00 each morning he arose for zazen. Next he would chant sutras and begin cleaning the temple with the others. They would work throughout the day and then, in the evenings, they all would resume zazen. Suzuki idolized his teacher, who was a strong disciplinarian. So-on often was rough on Suzuki but gave him some latitude for being so young.

When Suzuki turned 13, on May 18, 1917, So-on ordained him as a novice monk (unsui). He was given the Buddhist name Shogaku Shunryu, yet So-on nicknamed him Crooked Cucumber for his forgetful and unpredictable nature.

=== Higher education ===
In 1924 Shunryu enrolled in a Soto preparatory school in Tokyo not far from Shogan-ji, where he lived on the school grounds in the dorm. From 1925 to 1926 Suzuki did Zen training with Dojun Kato in Shizuoka at Kenko-in. He continued his schooling during this period. Here Shunryu became head monk for a 100-day retreat, after which he was no longer merely considered a novice. He had completed his training as a head monk.

In 1925 Shunryu graduated from preparatory school and entered Komazawa University, the Soto Zen university in Tokyo. During this period he continued his connections with So-on in Zoun-in, going back and forth whenever possible.

Some of his teachers here were discussing how Soto Zen might reach a bigger audience with students and, while Shunryu couldn't comprehend how Western cultures could ever understand Zen, he was intrigued.

On August 26, 1926, So-on gave Dharma transmission to Suzuki. He was 22. Shunryu's father also retired as abbot at Shogan-ji this same year, and moved the family onto the grounds of Zoun-in where he served as inkyo (retired abbot).

=== Eihei-ji ===
After graduating from Komazawa, Suzuki continued training at Eihei-ji. In September 1930, he entered the training temple. The abbot at the time was Gempo Kitano, whom Suzuki respected. Kitano had previously led Soto Zen in Korea and had helped found Zenshuji in Los Angeles. Suzuki’s father, Sogaku, had known Kitano earlier and appears to have viewed him with some rivalry or resentment. At Eihei-ji, Suzuki was assigned to serve Ian Kishizawa-roshi, a noted Soto teacher associated with Nishiari Bokusan and Oka Sotan.

=== Death ===
Suzuki died on December 4, 1971, presumably from cancer.

=== Publications ===
A collection of his teishos (Zen talks) was published in 1970 in the book Zen Mind, Beginner's Mind during Suzuki's lifetime. His lectures on the Sandokai are collected in Branching Streams Flow in the Darkness, edited by Mel Weitsman and Michael Wenger and published in 1999. Edward Espe Brown edited Not Always So: Practicing the True Spirit of Zen which was published in 2002.

A biography of Suzuki, titled Crooked Cucumber, was written by David Chadwick in 1999.

== Lineage ==
Soto lineage
Soto school
Shunryu Suzuki (1904—1971)
Zentatsu Richard Baker (born 1936) shiho 1971
Hoitsu Suzuki (born 1939)
1. Tenshin Reb Anderson (born 1943) shiho 1983
  1. Sobun Katherine Thanas (☸1927—2012) 1988
    1. Fugan Eugene Bush (born 1954) 2010
      1. Ekyo Dana Takagi 2015
      2. Monshin Nannette Overley 2022
      3. Seigen Chuck Overley 2022
      4. Tetsudo Patrice Monsour - lay entrustment 2023
    2. Gotsuzan Robert Reese (born 1953) 2010
    3. Onryu Patrick Teverbaugh 2011
      1. Myoka Cathy Toldi 2015
    4. Sozan Cathy Whilden (born 1940) 2011
    5. Tey Roberts (☸) - lay entrustment 2011
    6. Patricia Wolff - lay entrustment 2011
    7. Susan McDonald - lay entrustment 2011
  2. Zengyu Paul Discoe (born 1942) 1988
  3. Chikudo Jerome Petersen (☸1928—2010) 1988
  4. Kokuzan Ananda Claude Dalenberg (☸1927—2008) 1988
  5. Eijun Linda Cutts (born 1947) 1996
    1. Keimyo Dario Girolami (born 1967) 2012
    2. Kyoshin Wendy Lewis 2012
    3. Jisan Tova Green (born 1940) 2015
    4. Wendy Johnson - lay entrustment 2006
    5. Ryuko Laura Burges - lay entrustment
    6. Myoju Shinjin Erin Merk 2024
  6. Jakujo Gary McNabb (☸1943—2022) 1998
  7. Furyu Nancy Schroeder 1999
    1. Reirin Alheidis Gumbel 2019
    2. Hakusho Johan Ostlund 2023
  8. Myo Denis Lahey (born 1951) 1999
  9. Taigen Dan Leighton (born 1950) 2000
    1. Nyozan Eric Shutt 2019
    2. Eishin Nancy Easton 2019
  10. Meiya Wender 2002
  11. Leslie James - lay transmission 2002
  12. Setsuan Gaelyn Godwin (born 1951) 2003
    1. Hokyo Louise Dreyfus - lay entrustment - 2012
    2. Nessho Cathy Crouch - lay entrustment - 2012
    3. Dojin Sarah Emerson (born 1971) 2015
    4. Yazan Dave Johnson 2019
    5. Kogen Glen Duval - lay entrustment
    6. Shinji Mary Carol Edwards - lay entrustment
  13. Kiku Christina Lehnherr (born 1947) 2005
    1. Jisan Anna Thorn 2018
    2. Yoen Rosmarie Auriau 2019
  14. Taiyo Lipscomb (born 1943) 2009
    1. Hogetsu Laurie Belzer (born 1959) 2022
  15. Kokyo Henkel (born 1966) 2010
    1. Mushin Antoinette Parekh (born 1959) 2021
  16. Zesho Susan O’Connell 2017
  17. Korin Charlie Pokorny 2018
2. Zenshin Philip Whalen (☸1923—2002) 1987
3. Issan Dorsey (☸1933—1990) 1988
  1. Kijun Steve Allen 1990
4. Ryuten Paul Rosenblum 1999
5. Koyo Dan Welch
6. Chikai Harper Leah (born 1946)
7. Zenki Christian Dillo 2013
8. Yoseki David Beck
9. Tatsudo Nicole Baden
10. Shosan Gerald Weischede
11. Ikkyo Ottmar Engel
1. Jakusho Kwong (born 1935) shiho 1978
  1. Uji Mikolaj Markiewicz
  2. Kimyo Helga Jóakimsdóttir
  3. Zenki Ástvaldur Traustason
  4. Nyoze Demian Kwong
2. Sojun Mel Weitsman (☸1929-2021) 1984
  1. Zenkei Blanche Hartman (☸1926—2016) 1988
    1. Seirin Barbara Kohn - retired 2000
    2. Baizan Cathleen Williams 2001
    3. Kosho McCall (born 1948) 2004
      1. Colin Gipson 2014
      2. Jared Michaels
      3. Peg Syverson
      4. Koji Dreher 2019
    4. Dainei John King (☸1935—2001) 2005
    5. Meiji Tony Patchell 2005
      1. Busshin Lisa Hoffman (born 1959) 2013
      2. Hobu Beata Chapman (born 1958) 2013
      3. Ava Stanton - lay entrustment 2015
    6. Ryumon Hilda Guitierrez Baldoquin 2008
    7. Gengetsu Jana Drakka (☸1952-2017) 2009
    8. Keiryu Liên Shutt
    9. Myozen Joan Amaral (born 1966) 2013
    10. Flint Sparks [Dharma Entrustment?]
  2. Zoketsu Norman Fischer (born 1946) 1988
    1. Seido Lee deBarros (☸1936—2019) 1998
    2. Gyokujun Teishin Layla Smith (☸1946-2022) 1998
    3. Daigan Lueck (☸1931—2015) 1999
    4. Shokan Jordan Thorn (☸1953—2018) 2003
    5. Kanzan Bruce Fortin (born 1941) 2003
    6. Kotatsu John Bailes - 2004
      1. Mark Nelson - Dharma Entrustment
    7. Seishin Arlene Lueck 2005
    8. Jo Myphon Hunt - retired 2005
    9. Shinko Rick Slone 2009
    10. Daion Gloria Ann Lee 2009
    11. Do-An Robert Thomas (born 1959) 2009
    12. Ingen Breen (born 1963) 2009
    13. Nomon Tim Burnett (born 1966) 2011
      1. Heigaku Talus Latona - lay entrustment 2021
    14. Anka Rick Spencer 2011
    15. Shinmon Michael Newton (born 1953) 2011
    16. Myoshin Kate McCandless (born 1951) 2011
    17. Peter van der Sterre 2011
    18. Jishi Jeff Bickner (born 1948) 2012
    19. Rinsho Jay Simoneaux 2012
    20. Hoka Chris Fortin (born 1949)
    21. Shudo Chris Burkhart 2019
    22. Mick Sopko - lay entrustment
    23. Susan Moon - lay entrustment
    24. Martha DeBarros - lay entrustment
    25. Eihei Peter Levitt - lay entrustment
      1. Chōkō Kangen Judy Daylen - lay entrustment
      2. Kakuichi Kōshin Simon Rompré - lay entrustment
    26. Alan Block - lay entrustment
    27. James Flaherty - lay entrustment
    28. John Wiley - lay entrustment 2010
    29. J. Lee Nelson - lay entrustment
    30. Nancy Welch - lay entrustment (☸ d.2019)
  3. Ryushin Paul Haller (born 1947) 1993
    1. Unzan Mako Voelkel 2019
    2. Anshi Zachary Smith 2019
    3. Yakugen Myogan Djinn Gallagher 2023
    4. Tatsu Shi Mu Seki Tim Kroll 2023
    5. Gendo Lucy Xiao 2025
  4. Myogen Steve Stucky (☸1946-2013) 1993
    1. Koshin Christine Palmer (born 1949) 2013
    2. Renshin Bunce (born 1943) 2013
  5. Steve Weintraub (born 1947) 1993
    1. David Weinberg (born 1943) 2012
    2. Nyokai Laurie Senauke 2021
    3. Elizabeth Sawyer (born 1948) - lay entrustment 2013
  6. Josho Pat Phelan (born 1948) 1995
    1. Jakuko Mo Ferrell 2023
    2. Zenki Kathleen Batson 2023
    3. Kuden Paul Boyle 2023
  7. Ryuge Gil Fronsdal (born 1954) 1995
  8. Jusan Edward Espe Brown (born 1945) 1996
    1. Kyosho Valorie Beer 2013
      1. Barbara Baccei 2023
    2. Danny Parker 2001
      1. Tiffany Martens 2009
  9. Fran Tribe (☸) 1997
  10. Hozan Alan Senauke (☸1947—2024) 1998
    1. Kenshin Catherine Cascade 2012
    2. Nanzan Shunki Harald Schoecklmann 2022
    3. Juen Ryushin Friederike Boissevain 2022
    4. Hokyo Josu Mary Duryee - lay entrustment 2023
  11. Maylie Scott (☸1935—2001) 1998
  12. Shosan Victoria Austin (born 1953) 1999
    1. Konin Cardenas
    2. Zenju Earthlyn Manuel
    3. Myogen Kathryn Stark (born 1950) 2013
    4. Silver John Hall - lay entrustment 2022
  13. Dairyu Michael Wenger (born 1947) 1999
    1. Surei Darlene Cohen (☸1942—2011) 2002
      1. Jion Susan Postal (☸1940—2014)
        1. Myozan Dennis Keegan (☸1947—2016)
        2. Ebony Song (born 1956)
      2. Ryotan Cynthia Kear (born 1952) 2010
        1. Cynthia Ziegler 2017
        2. Tom Ryuki Hawkins 2017
        3. Koshin Steven Tierney 2021
        4. Betsy Sei Ka Groh 2024
        5. Craig Kodo Edelblut 2025
      3. Sarita Tamayo-Moraga
    2. Tokuden Mark Lancaster (born 1949) 2006
    3. Marc Lesser (born 1952)
    4. Inryu Bobbi Ponce-Barger
    5. Anshin Rosalie Curtis 2011
    6. Bernd Bender (born 1958)
    7. Marsha Angus - lay entrustment
    8. Jamie Howell (born 1945) lay entrustment
  14. Chikudo Lew Richmond (born 1947) 2002
    1. Rinso Ed Sattizahn 2012
      1. Nancy Horin Raika Petrin lay entrustment 2011
      2. Seigan Sozan Miglioli 2025
    2. Kuzan Peter Schireson (born 1946) 2012
    3. Hosho Peter Coyote (born 1941) 2019
      1. Kugaku Richard Laubly 2023
      2. Haku-un David Brazier 2025
  15. Yozen Peter Schneider (born 1937) 2002
  16. Soshin Teah Strozer (born 1944) 2003
    1. Pamela Weiss 2016
    2. Laura O’Loughlin - lay entrustment 2017
    3. Tenzen David Zimmerman 2018
    4. Kosen Gregory Snyder 2019
    5. Heather Shoren Iarusso 2022
  17. Shinshu Roberts (born 1950) 2004
  18. Daijaku Judith Kinst (born 1951) 2004
  19. Myoan Grace Schireson (born 1946) 2005
    1. Myokaku Jane Schneider (born 1936) 2008
    2. Baika Andrea Heaton (Pratt) (born 1960) 2011
      1. Myoho Joshin John Busch 2018
      2. Myogo Mary-Allen Macneil 2019
    3. Myoko Sara Hunsaker 2014
  20. Zenki Mary Mocine (born 1944) 2005
  21. Sokaku Kathie Fischer (born 1952) 2011
  22. Denkei Raul Moncayo
  23. Zenshin Greg Fain (born 1956) 2012
    1. Zenkai Curtis Fabens (☸1982-2023) 2023
    2. Gyokujun Susan Spencer - lay entrustment 2017
  24. Shinchi Linda Galijan (born 1958) 2012
  25. Jiryu Rutschman-Byler 2014
  26. Ryushin Andrea Thach
  27. Ikushin Gerry Oliva
  28. Kakudo Peter Overton
  29. Karen DeCotis 2019
  30. Ango Sara Tashker 2019
  31. Onzen Robert Rosenbaum - lay entrustment
  32. Tetsudo Ross Blum - lay entrustment
  33. Kokyo Susan Marvin - lay entrustment
  34. Sodo Ron Nestor - lay entrustment
  35. Nyokai Laurie Senauke - lay entrustment
  36. Hosho Karen Sundheim - lay entrustment
  37. Bokuren Jake Van Akkeren - lay entrustment
3. Keido Les Kaye (born 1933) 1985
  1. Shungen Misha Merrill (born 1953) 1998
    1. Daion Jane Shuman (born 1951) 2011
    2. Kakushin Jill Kaplan (born 1949) 2013
  2. Nokai Jean-Yves Leclerc (born 1942) 1998
  3. Etsudo Patty Krahl (born 1950) 2004
  4. Jintei Harold Little 2004
    1. Tendo Stacy Waymire 2021
    2. Kigetsu Ramana Waymire 2021
  5. Om Devi Reynolds
  6. Cornelia Junfu Shonkwiler (born 1940) 2008
4. Ryuzen Robby Pellett (☸1956—2019) 2010

== Quotations ==
- "In the beginner's mind there are many possibilities, in the expert's mind there are few."

== Books ==
- Zen Mind, Beginner's Mind. Ed. Trudy Dixon. Weatherhill, 1970. ISBN 0-834-80079-9
- Branching Streams Flow in the Darkness: Zen Talks on the Sandokai 1st ed. Eds. Mel Weitsman and Michael Wenger. University of California Press, 1999. ISBN 0-520-21982-1
- Not Always So: Practicing the True Spirit of Zen. Ed. Edward Espe Brown. HarperCollins, 2002. ISBN 0-060-95754-9
- Zen is Right Here. Shambhala, 2007. ISBN 978-1-59030-491-4
- "To Shine One Corner of the World: moments with Shunryu Suzuki / the students of Shunryu Suzuki". Ed. David Chadwick. Broadway Books, 2001. ISBN 0-7679-0651-9 (Out of print - same as Zen is Right Here)
- Zen Is Right Now: More Teaching Stories and Anecdotes of Shunryu Suzuki. Ed. David Chadwick. Shambhala, 2021. ISBN 978-1-611809-14-5
- Crooked Cucumber: the Life and Zen Teaching of Shunryu Suzuki. by David Chadwick. Harmony, 2000. ISBN 978-0767901055

== See also ==
- Timeline of Zen Buddhism in the United States
- Shoshin
