= Michael Wenger =

Dairyu Michael Wenger
- Title: Guiding Teacher

Personal life
- Born: 1947 (age 78–79) Brooklyn, NY
- Spouse: Barbara Wenger
- Education: The New School, M.A.
- Occupation: Zen Teacher, Brush Artist

Religious life
- Religion: Zen Buddhism
- School: Sōtō
- Lineage: Shunryu Suzuki
- Dharma names: Dairyu

Senior posting
- Based in: Dragons Leap Meditation Center
- Predecessor: Sojun Mel Weitsman
- Successor: Darlene Cohen; Mark Lancaster; Rosalie Curtis; Marc Lesser; Shika Bernd Bender; Inryu Bobbi Ponce-Barger
- Students: Steven Tierney Tim Wicks Rachel Flynn Richard Urban Kogan Sheldon Steven Davidowitz
- Website: www.dragonsleap.com

Dairyu Michael Wenger is a Sōtō Zen priest and current guiding teacher of Dragons Leap Meditation Center in San Francisco. Prior to establishing Dragons Leap in 2012, Wenger served as Dean of Buddhist Studies at the San Francisco Zen Center (SFZC) in San Francisco, California—where he has been a member since 1972. A Dharma heir of Sojun Mel Weitsman, Wenger is also a former president of the SFZC where he continues to serve on the Elders Council. He received his M.A. from The New School in New York, New York.

== Bibliography ==
- Büssing, Arndt; Wenger, Michael (2003). Der Tau am Morgen ist weiser als wir : alte und neue Zen-Geschichten. Theseus. ISBN 3-89620-209-X. OCLC 138403838.
- Wenger, Michael (2002). Wind bell: Teachings from the San Francisco Zen Center 1968-2001. North Atlantic Books. ISBN 1-55643-381-6.
- Suzuki, Shunryu; Weitsman, Mel; Wenger, Michael (1999). Branching Streams Flow in the Darkness: Zen Talks on the Sandokai. University of California Press. ISBN 0-520-21982-1.
- Wenger, Michael (1994). 33 Fingers: A Collection of Modern American Koans. Clear Glass Publishing. ISBN 0-931425-35-2.

== See also ==
- Buddhism in the United States
- Timeline of Zen Buddhism in the United States
