= Chade-Meng Tan =

American software engineer

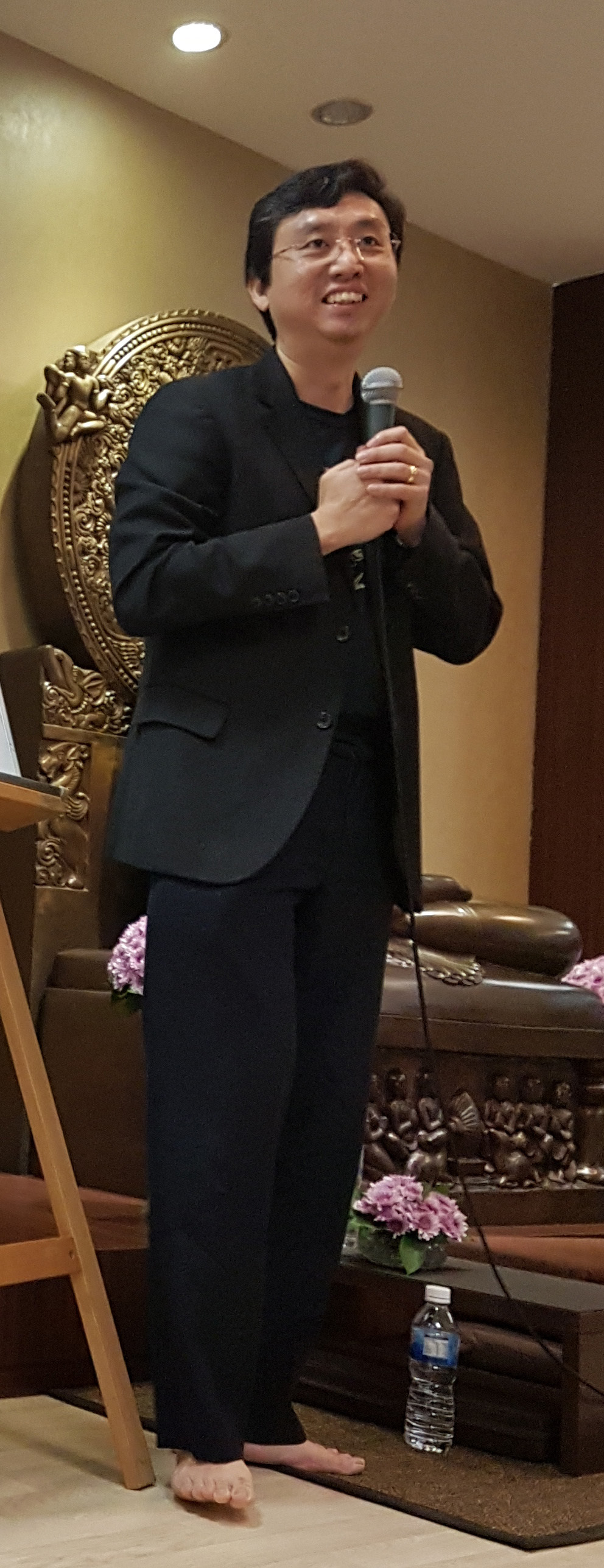
Chade-Meng Tan, speaking at a Buddhist organization in Singapore, July 2017

Chade-Meng Tan (Chinese: 陳一鳴), known informally as Meng, is an author, philanthropist, motivator, and former software engineer. He was previously employed at Google and greeted celebrities who visited the Google campus. He retired from Google as its "Jolly Good Fellow" at the age of 45. He co-founded the Search Inside Yourself Leadership Institute, along with Marc Lesser, and is co-chair of One Billion Acts of Peace, which was nominated eight times for the Nobel Peace Prize. He is also an adjunct professor at the Lee Kuan Yew School of Public Policy in the National University of Singapore, and a graduate from Nanyang Technological University, Singapore.

== Career ==
Meng was Google employee number 107 and his job title was "Jolly Good Fellow". He joined Google in 2000 after working for five years at Kent Ridge Digital Laboratories in Singapore. At Google, he worked for eight years in engineering on projects such as mobile search and search quality. Tan earned his eccentric Google title after starting “mindfulness training” courses at the company — a groundbreaking mindfulness-based emotional intelligence course called Search Inside Yourself, which was featured on the front page of the Sunday Business section of The New York Times in April 2014. Search Inside Yourself is also the title of Meng's 2014 self-help book, which became a New York Times bestseller and was endorsed by President Jimmy Carter and the Dalai Lama.

=== Mindfulness non-profits ===
Motivated by his belief that happiness is a state of mind, these mindfulness training courses were meant to help Googlers find inner peace and clear their minds to manage stress and negativity. The classes proved extremely successful at Google, which led Meng to write a best-selling book, “Search Inside Yourself”. These successes (outside of his engineering role) led him to work for two years as the Head of Personal Growth and to chair non-profit “Search Inside Yourself Leadership Institute” (SIYLI, pronounced “silly”), to bring the same popular Google class to others.

Meng has left Google on October 30, 2015 to focus spreading his message and courses on happiness, meditation and spreading world peace, as announced on his personal blog. He hopes that Search Inside Yourself will eventually contribute to world peace in a meaningful way.

Meng is part of the team of the non-profit organisation One Billion Acts of Peace, which was nominated for the Nobel Peace Prize in 2015. The nomination was signed by six Nobel Laureates.

In 2018, Meng stepped down from the Search Inside Yourself Leadership Institute at the board's request following the results of a third-party investigation citing “inappropriate behavior” prior to the founding of SIYLI.

== Books ==
- Tan, Chade-Meng (2014). Search Inside Yourself: The Unexpected Path to Achieving Success, Happiness (and World Peace). HarperOne. ISBN 978-0062116932.
- Tan, Chade-Meng (2017). Joy on Demand. SanFran. ISBN 978-0062378873.
- Tan, Chade-Meng; Forall, Soryu (2023). Buddhism for All: The Joyful Path to Enlightenment. Buddhism.net Publishing. ISBN 979-8989013616.

== Celebrity photo collection ==
Meng started collecting celebrity photographs when Jimmy Carter and Al Gore visited the Google campus. This became a tradition, and he now has a large collection of photographs of his meetings with celebrities at Google.
