= Berkeley Zen Center =

Temple in California, US

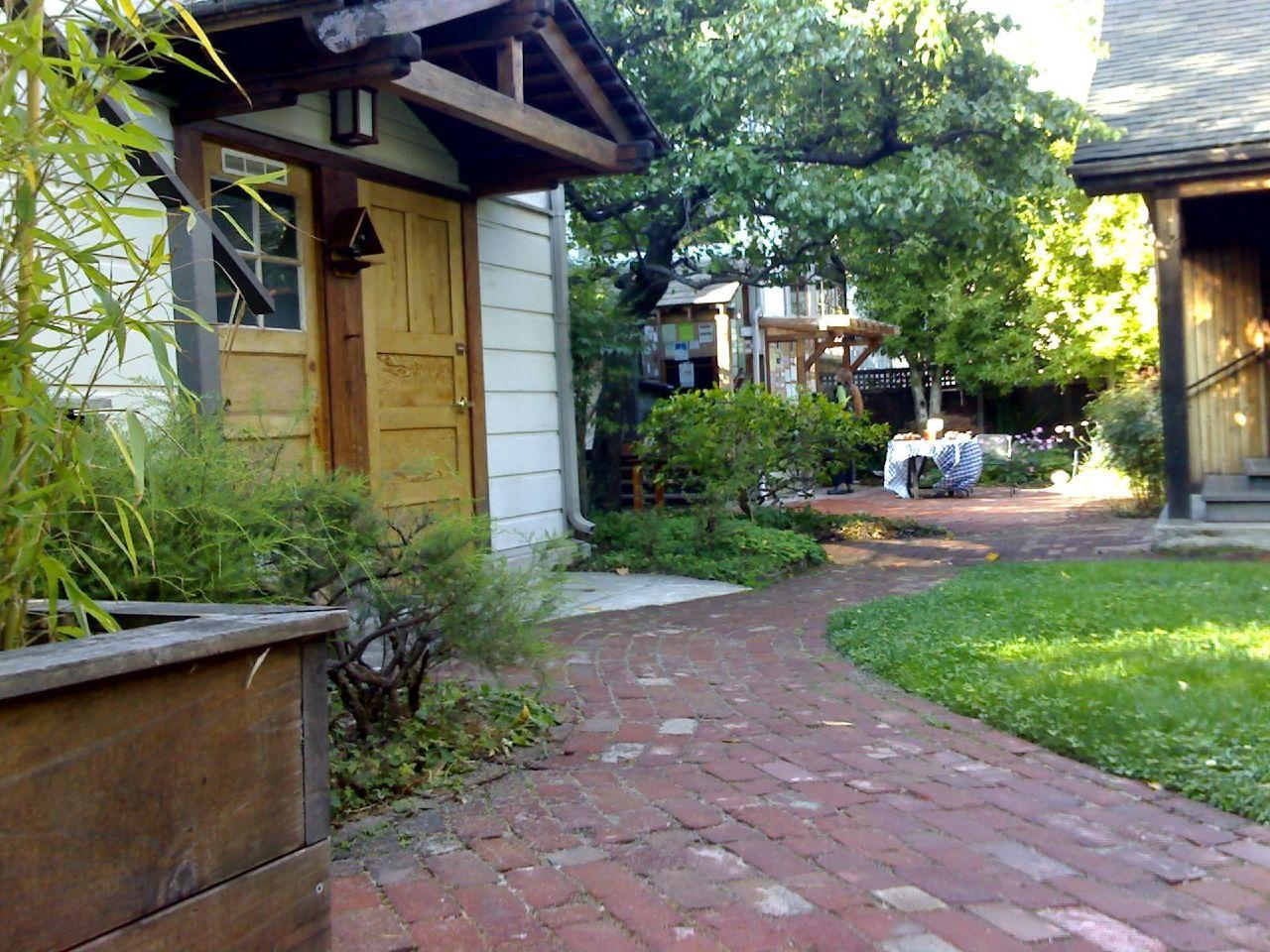

- Location within Oakland, California Location within San Francisco Bay Area Location within California Location within the United States Location within North America

Religion
- Affiliation: Sōtō

Location
- Location: 1931 Russell Street, Berkeley, California 94703
- Country: United States
- Coordinates: 37.856540°N 122.269917°W

Architecture
- Founder: Sojun Mel Weitsman; Shunryu Suzuki

Website
- www.berkeleyzencenter.org

Berkeley Zen Center (BZC), official temple name Shogakuji (祥岳寺, Shōgaku-ji), is a residential Sōtō Zen Buddhist practice centre located in Berkeley, California which has been led since 2024 by Shinchi Linda Galijan and Zenshin Greg Fain.

Founded as an affiliate temple of San Francisco Zen Center in 1967 in a house on Dwight Way by Hakuryu Sojun Mel Weitsman and Shōgaku Shunryu Suzuki, Weitsman became BZC's abbot in 1985 after receiving Dharma transmission from Suzuki's son Hoitsu Suzuki. Weitsman's Dharma heir Hozan Alan Senauke took over as abbot in 2021, living on-site with his wife and fellow ordained Zen priest Laurie Senauke until his death in 2024.

In 1979, BZC relocated to a dedicated temple on Russell Street which houses resident priests, students and lay practitioners. BZC has an active community and a full schedule of zen service, student talks, dharma talks, and zazen.

== Notable people ==
Zenkei Blanche Hartman began sitting zazen in 1969, receiving Dharma transmission from Sojun Mel Weitsman in 1988.

Kushin Seisho Maylie Scott taught at the center after received Dharma transmission from Sojun Mel Weitsman in 1998.

== Gallery ==
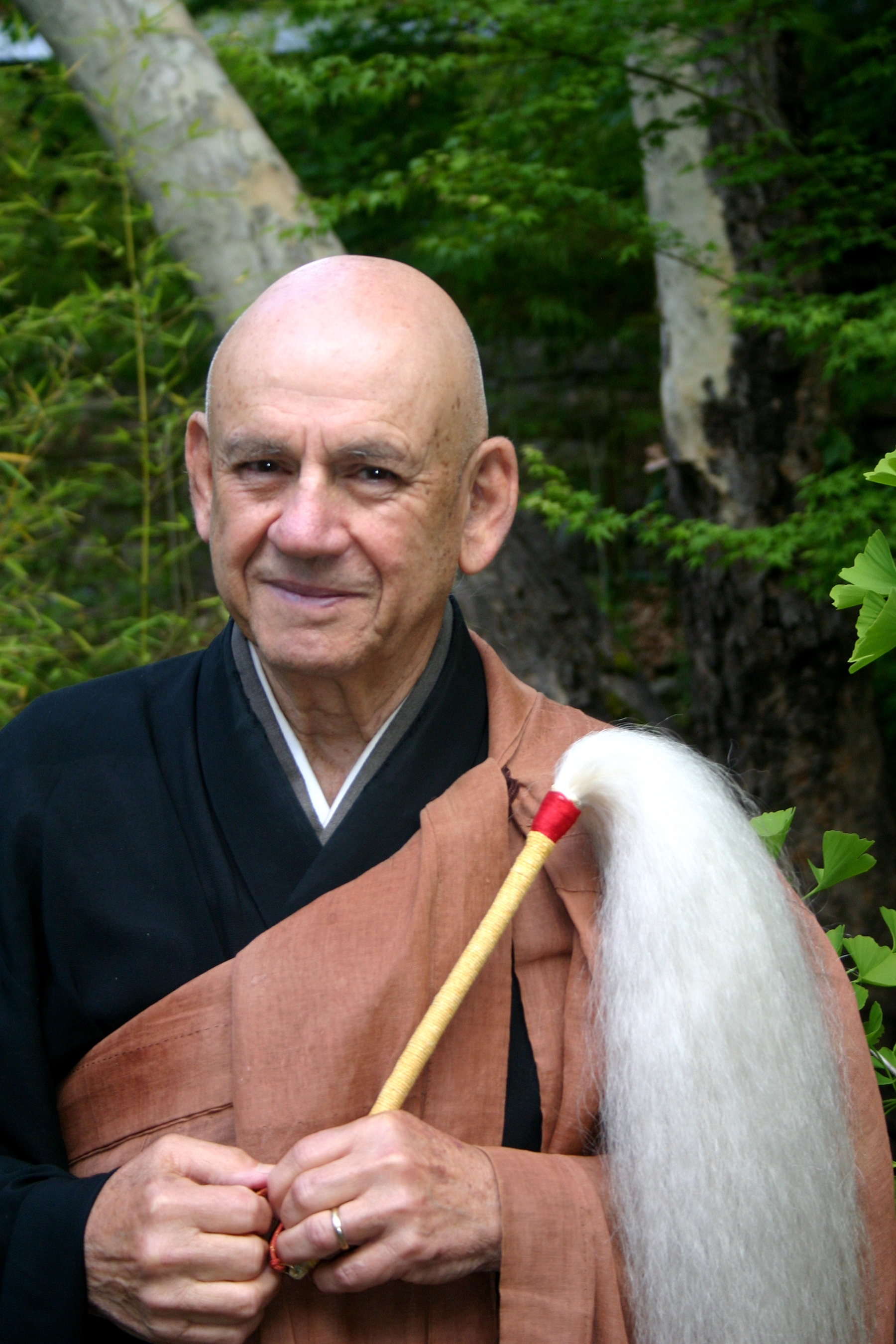
Sojun Mel Weitsman

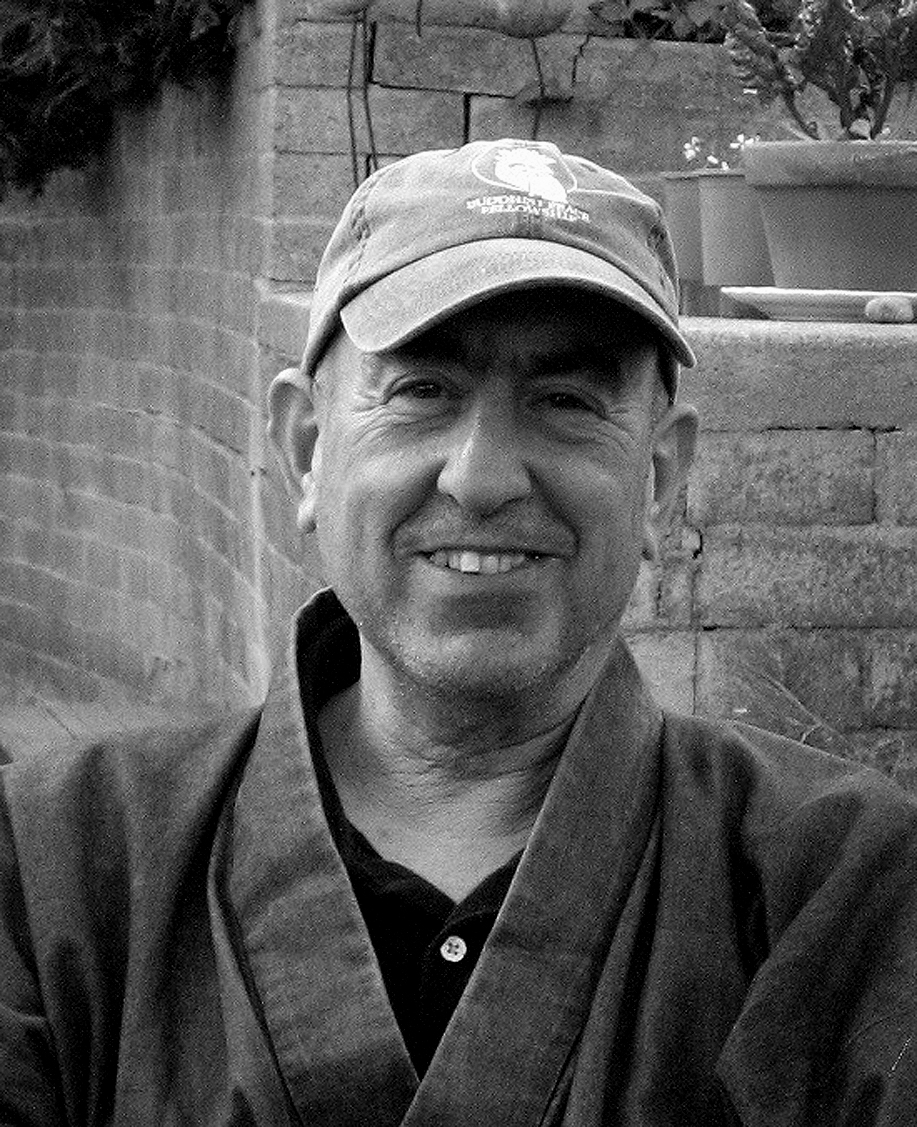
Hozan Alan Senauke

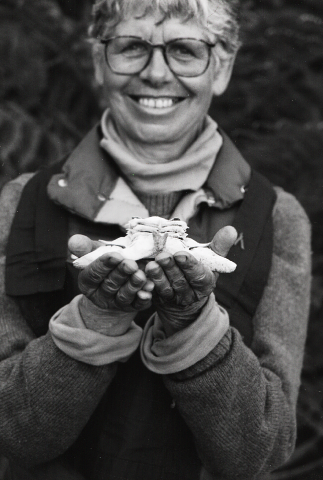
Maylie Scott

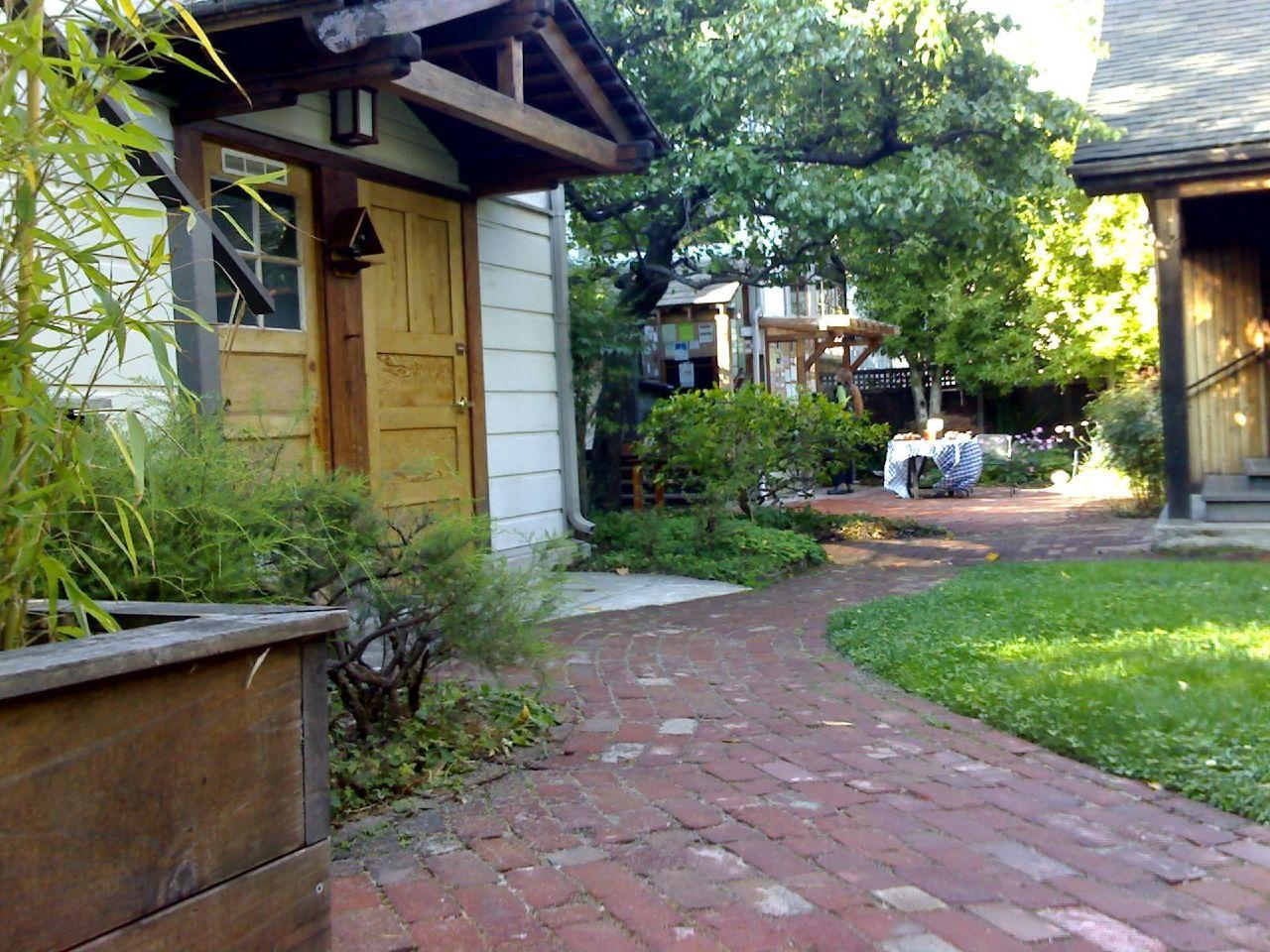

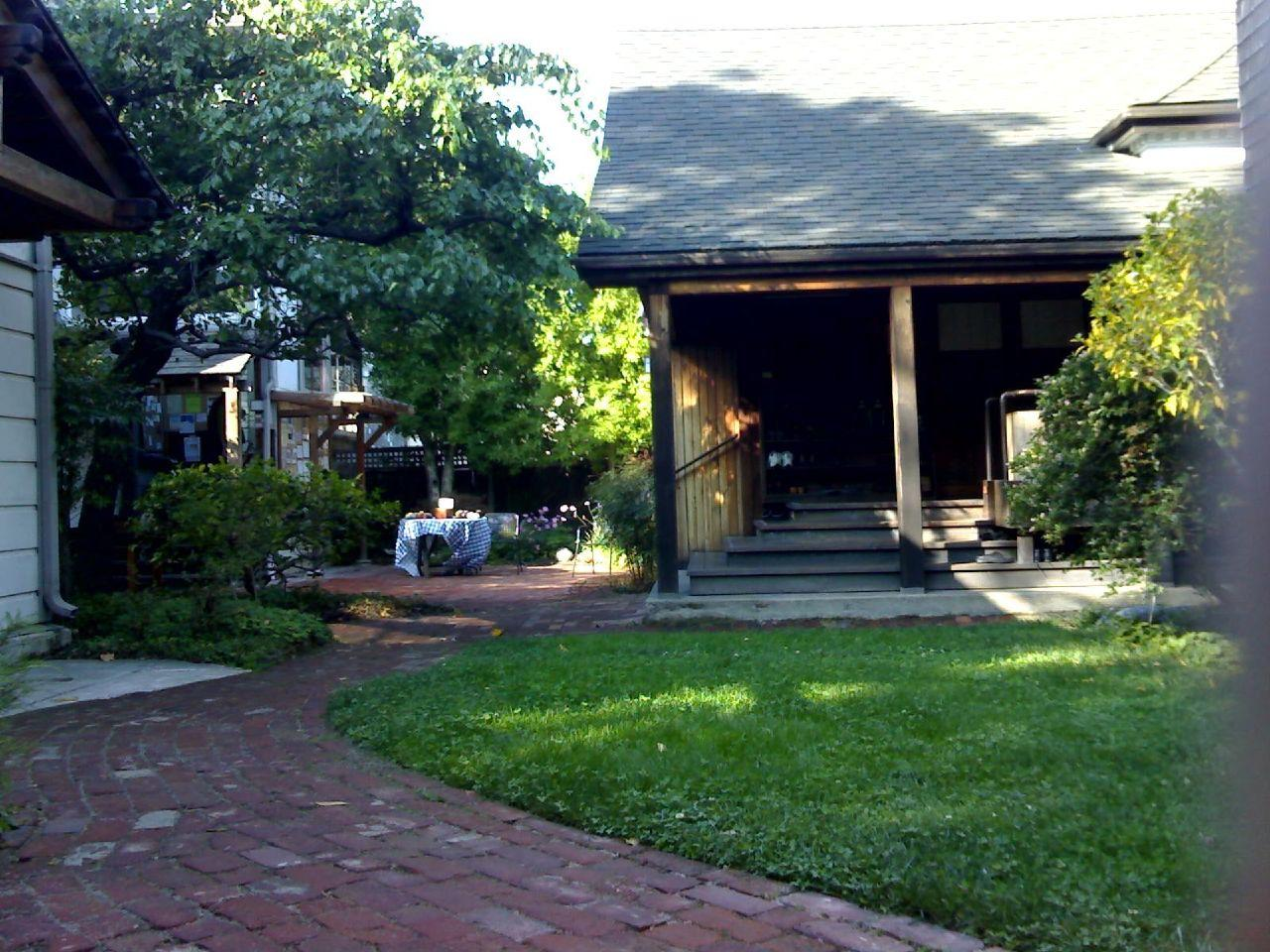
Zendo

== See also ==
- Buddhism in the United States
- Timeline of Zen Buddhism in the United States
