= Shambhala Publications =

American publishing company

- Founded: 1969
- Founder: Samuel Bercholz, Michael Fagan
- Country of origin: United States
- Headquarters location: Boulder, Colorado
- Distribution: Penguin Random House Publisher Services
- Key people: Nikko Odiseos (President); Samuel Bercholz (Chairman); Sara Bercholz (Executive Vice President); Ivan Bercholz (Vice President)
- Nonfiction topics: Eastern studies, religion, philosophy, martial arts
- Imprints: 7
- No. of employees: 48
- Official website: www.shambhala.com

Shambhala Publications is an independent publishing company based in Boulder, Colorado. According to the company, it specializes in "books that present creative and conscious ways of transforming the individual, the society, and the planet". Many of its titles deal with Buddhism and related topics in Eastern studies, religion, philosophy, and martial arts. The company's name was inspired by the Sanskrit word Shambhala, referring to a mystical kingdom hidden beyond the snowpeaks of the Himalayas, according to the Tibetan Buddhist tradition. Its authors include Chögyam Trungpa, Pema Chödrön, Thomas Cleary, Ken Wilber, Fritjof Capra, A. H. Almaas, Diane Musho Hamilton, John Daido Loori, John Stevens, Edward Espe Brown and Natalie Goldberg.

The company is unaffiliated with Shambhala Buddhism, Shambhala International, or Lion's Roar (previously entitled Shambhala Sun) magazine.

== History ==
Shambhala was founded in 1969 by Samuel Bercholz and Michael Fagan, in Berkeley, California. Its books are distributed by Penguin Random House. In 1976 Shambhala moved to Boulder, Colorado to be near the Naropa Institute. In 1986 Shambhala moved to Boston, housed in Horticultural Hall, Boston, Massachusetts, which adjoins the Christian Science Center. In 2010, Nikko Odiseos was appointed President and continues to lead the company along with owners Sara and Ivan Bercholz, children of the founder. In 2012 Snow Lion Publications joined Shambhala.

In September 2015, after a thirty-year history in Boston, Shambhala Publications moved its headquarters to Boulder again, at 4720 Walnut St, with 35 inhouse staff, now grown to 41.

In May 2016 Shambala acquired Rodmell Press. As of August 2016 Rodmells 40 own titles will appear under the Shambala logo.
