= Glossary of Buddhism =

Some Buddhist terms and concepts lack direct translations into English that cover the breadth of the original term. Below are given a number of important Buddhist terms, short definitions, and the languages in which they appear. In this list, an attempt has been made to organize terms by their original form and give translations and synonyms in other languages along with the definition.

Languages and traditions dealt with here:

- English (EN) – Buddhism in the West
- Pāli (PI) – Theravada
- Sanskrit (SA) – primarily Mahayana
- Bengali (BN) – Theravada
- Sinhala (SI) – Theravada
- Burmese (MY) – Theravada
- Karen (KAR) – Theravada
- Khmer (KM) – Theravada
- Mon (MNW) – Theravada
- Mongolian (MN) – primarily Vajrayana
- Shan (SHN) – Theravada
- Tibetan (BO) – Tibetan Buddhism
- Dzongkha (DZ) – Tibetan Buddhism
- Thai (TH) – primarily Theravada
- Lao (LO) – Theravada
- CJKV languages
  - Chinese (ZH) – Chinese Buddhism
    - Cantonese (YUE) – Buddhism in Hong Kong
    - Mandarin (CMN) – Buddhism in China
    - Taiwanese Hokkien (NAN) – Buddhism in Taiwan
  - Japanese (JA) – Japanese Buddhism
  - Korean (KO) – Korean Buddhism
  - Vietnamese (VI) – Mahayana/Theravada
- Javanese (JV) – Mahayana/Theravada

== A ==
Definition	Etymology	In other languages
abhidharma Scholarly teachings of the Buddha. A category of scriptures that attempts to use Buddhist teachings to create a systematic, abstract description of all worldly phenomena.	abhi is "above" or "about", dhamma is "teaching"; Pāli: abhidhamma; Sanskrit: abhidharma	Bur: အဘိဓမ္မာ abhidhamma (IPA: [əbḭdəmà]); Khmer: អភិធម្ម âphĭthômm; Tib: ཆོས་མངོན་པ chos mngon pa; Mn: их ном, билиг ухаан; ikh nom, bilig ukhaan; Thai: อภิธรรม a-pi-tam; 阿毘達磨／阿毗昙; Cn: Āpídámó; Jp: Abidatsuma; Ko: 아비달마, Abidalma; Vi: a-tì-đạt-ma, thắng pháp
Avataṃsakasūtra "Garland Scripture" A Mahāyāna sutra which discusses the Bodhisattva path and a variety of teachings.	Sanskrit: Avataṃsakasūtra	大方廣佛華嚴經 / 華嚴經
Abhidhamma Pitaka The third basket of the Tripitaka canon, the reorganization of all doctrines in a systematic way.	Pāli: Abhidhamma-piṭaka; Sanskrit: Abhidharma-piṭaka	Bur: အဘိဓမ္မာပိဋကတ် Abidhamma Pitakat (IPA: [əbḭdamà pḭdəɡaʔ]); Khmer: អភិធម្មបិដក âphĭthômm bĕdâk; Mon: အဘိဓဝ်ပိတကတ ([əpʰìʔtʰò pɔeʔtəkɔt]); Thai: อภิธรรมปิฎก a-pi-tam-pi-dok; 論藏, 論蔵; Cn: Lùnzàng; Jp: Ronzō; Ko: 논장, Nonjang; Vi: Luận tạng, Tạng luận, tạng thứ ba trong ba tạng là kinh, luật và luận; Mn: Илт ном, Ilt nom
Abhiniṣkramaṇasūtra "Sūtra of the Great Renunciation" A translation of the Chinese text Fo Benxing Ji Jing, a biography of the Buddha.	Sanskrit: Abhiniṣkramaṇasūtra	佛本行集經
Acharya, lit. "teacher", A teacher who has demonstrated a deep understanding of the Dhamma, and is entrusted with the responsibility of guiding novice Bhikkus.	Pāli: ācariya; Sanskrit: ācārya	Bur: ဆရာ saya (IPA: [sʰəjà]); Shan: ဢႃႇၸရီႉယႃႉ atsariya ([ʔaː˨ tsa˩ ri˥ jaː˥]); Thai: อาจารย์ ajahn; 阿闍梨 or 阿闍梨耶; Cn: āshélí or āshélíyē; Jp: ajari or ajariya; Ko: 아사리, asari or 아사리야 asariya; Vi: a-xà-lê or a-xà-lê-da or giáo thọ sư
Adbhutadharmaparyāyasūtra Part of the Gilgit Manuscripts, it is about merit making through the building of stupas, images, and relics.	Sanskrit: Adbhutadharmaparyāyasūtra,	甚稀有經 or 未曾有經; Cn: Shen xiyou jing
Adhigamadharma "The Dharma of Realization" A practical application of the Buddhist scriptures through higher discipline, higher mindfulness, and higher wisdom. Contrasted with Āgamadharma, a word for the scriptures, usually called the tripitaka.		證法
adhitthana Determination, resolution, or will. One of the Ten Perfections.	Pāli: Adhiṭṭhāna; Sanskrit: अधिष्ठान	Bur: အဓိဋ္ဌာန် (IPA: [ədeɪʔtʰàɴ]); Thai: อธิษฐาน ah-tid-taan; 決心 or 決意; Cn: Juéxīn, juéyì; Jp: kesshin; Ko: 결심, gyeolsim or 결의, gyeolui; Vi: nguyện lực
Āgama A category of early Buddhist texts preserved in Chinese. In Theravada, the term nikāya is used.	Sanskrit: Āgama	Pāli: Āgama (but usually called Nikāya); 阿含; Cn: Āhán; Jp: Agon; Ko: 아함, Aham; Vi: A-hàm
Āgamadharma "The Dharma of Transmission". A word for the tripitaka. Contrasted with adhigamadharma, which is the practical application of scripture.	Sanskrit: Āgamadharma	教法
ahimsa The devotion to non-violence and respect for all forms of life. Practitioners of ahimsa are often vegetarians or vegans.	Sanskrit: ahiṃsā; Pāli: ahiṃsā	Thai: อหิงสา 'ah-hing-sa'; 不害; Cn: bù hài; Jp: fugai; Ko: 불해, bulhae; Vi: bất hại
Akshobhya One of the Five Tathāgatas or Five Wisdom Buddhas, along with Ratnasambhava, Amitābha, Vairocana, and Amoghasiddhi.	Sanskrit: Akṣobhya	Mn: ᠬᠥᠳᠡᠯᠦᠰᠢ ᠦᠭᠡᠢ᠂ ᠦᠯᠦ ᠬᠥᠳᠡᠯᠦᠭᠴᠢ; Үл Хөдлөгч, Хөдөлшгүй; 阿閦如來; Cn: Āchùrúlái; Jp: Ashuku Nyorai; Vi: A-súc Như Lai; Ködelüsi ügei, Ülü hödelügci
akuśalakarmapatha In Tibetan Buddhism. A list of ten unwholesome courses of action. These are killing, stealing, sexual misconduct, lying, slander or malicious speech, offensive or harsh speech, frivolous prattle, covetousness, ill will, and wrong view.	Sanskrit: akuśalakarmapatha	
alayavijnana Store consciousness (alayavijnana) is a fundamental Yogacara concept, sometimes observed in other schools of Mahayana Buddhism, representing the deepest level of mind that stores all karmic "seeds" (experiences, actions, and memories). It operates continuously, day and night, processing information and influencing future behavior.	Sanskrit: ālayavijñāna	Tib: ཀུན་གཞི་རྣམ་པར་ཤེས་པ་ kun gzhi rnam par shes pa; 阿賴耶識, 阿頼耶識; Cn: ālàiyēshí; Jp: araya-shiki; Ko: 아뢰야식, aroeyasik; Vi: a-lại-da thức
Amitabha Lit. "The Buddha of Infinite Light". The main buddha of the Pure Land school, but is popular in other Mahayana sects as well. The image is of light as the form of wisdom, which has no form. Also interpreted as the Tathagata of Unhindered Light that Penetrates the Ten Quarters by Tan Luan, Shinran and others	Sanskrit: amitābha (lit. "limitless light") and amitāyus (lit. "limitless life")	阿彌陀 or 阿彌陀佛, 阿弥陀 or 阿弥陀仏; Cn: Ēmítuó or Ēmítuó fó; Jp: Amida or Amida-butsu; Ko: 아미타, Amita or 아미타불, Amitabul; Tw: O͘-mí-tô͘-hu̍t; Vi: A-Di-Đà, A-Di-Đà Phật, or Phật A-Di-Đà; Tib: འོད་དཔག་མེད།; Mn: ᠠᠮᠢᠨᠳᠠᠸᠠ᠂ ᠴᠠᠭᠯᠠᠰᠢ ᠦᠭᠡᠢ ᠭᠡᠷᠡᠯᠲᠦ; Аминдаваа, Цаглашгүй гэрэлт; Amindava, Tsaglasi ügei gereltü
Amitābhasūtra	Sanskrit: Amitābhasūtra	阿彌陀經
Amoghasiddhi	Sanskrit: Amoghasiddhi	Tib: Dön yö drub pa; Mn: ᠲᠡᠭᠦᠰ ᠨᠥᠭᠴᠢᠭᠰᠡᠨ᠂ ᠦᠢᠢᠯᠡ ᠪᠦᠲᠦᠭᠡ᠋᠌᠋᠋ᠺᠴᠢ; Төгс Нөгчигсөн, Үйл Бүтээгч; Tegüs nögcigsen, Üyile Bütügegci
anagārika A white-clothed student in the Theravada tradition who, for a few months, awaits being considered for sāmaṇera ordination. An anagārika takes the eight precepts, and in some cases, may choose to remain in this position for years to directly support the sangha.	Pāli: anāgarika	Thai: อนาคาริก a-na-ka-rik
anapanasati Mindfulness of the breath meditation	Pāli: ānāpānasati; Sanskrit: ānāpānasmṛti; Bur: အာနာပါန anapana (IPA: [ànàpàna̰])	
anatta The principle denial of the soul in any phenomena. See also negative theology.	Pāli: anattā; Sanskrit: anātman	Bur: အနတ္တ anatta (IPA: [ənaʔta̰]); Shan: ဢၼတ်ႉတႃႉ ([ʔa˩ nat˥ taː˥]); 無我; Cn: wúwǒ; Jp: muga; Ko: 무아, mua; Tw: bû-ngó͘; Vi: vô ngã
anicca Impermanence	Pāli: anicca; Sanskrit: anitya	Mn: ᠮᠥᠩᠬᠡ ᠪᠤᠰᠤ Мөнх бус; Bur: အနိစ္စ aneissa (IPA: [əneɪʔsa̰]); Shan: ဢၼိၵ်ႈၸႃႉ ([ʔa˩ nik˧ tsaː˥]); Thai: อนิจจา anijja; 無常; Cn: wúcháng; Jp: mujō; Ko: 무상, musang; Tw: bû-siông; Vi: vô thường
anitya Impermanence, synonym to anicca		
anuttara Unsurpassing	Pāli: anuttara; Sanskrit: anuttara	阿耨多羅／阿耨多罗 (無上／无上); Cn: Ānòuduōluó ("wǔshàng"); Jp: anokutara; Ko: 아뇩다라, anyokdara; Vi: A-nậu-đà-la (vô thượng)
anuttara samyak sambodhi, unsurpassable, complete, perfect enlightenment; unsurpassable, right, and full enlightenment	Pāli: Sanskrit:	Khmer: អនុត្តរសម្មាសម្ពោធិ ânŭttârôsâmméasâmpoŭthĭ; Tib:, 阿耨多罗三藐三菩提 (or 無上正等正覺); Cn: ānòuduōluó sānmiǎosānpútí (or wúshàng zhèngděng zhèngjué); Jp: anokutara sanmyakusanbodai; Ko: 아뇩다라삼먁삼보리, Anyokdara sammyak sambori; Vi: A-nậu-đà-la tam-miệu tam-bồ-đề, Vô-thượng chánh-đẳng chánh-giác, Sáng-suốt giác-ngộ hoàn-toàn
arhat, lit. "the Worthy One", A living person who has reached Enlightenment	Pāli: arahat or arahant; Sanskrit: arhat or arhant	Bur: ရဟန္တာ yahanda (IPA: [jaháɴdà]); Shan: ရႁၢၼ်းတႃႇ rahanta ([ra˩ haːn˦ taː˨]); Tib: དགྲ་ཅོམ་པ་, dgra com pa; Mn: архад, arkhad; Thai: อรหันต์ uh-ra-hann; 阿羅漢; Cn: āluóhàn; Jp: arakan; Ko: 아라한, arahan; Tw: a-lô-hàn; Vi: a-la-hán
ārūpyarāga	Sanskrit: ārūpyarāga	無色貪
asura "nongods,"	Sanskrit: asura	Thai: อสูร asula; 阿修羅; Cn: āxiūluó; Jp: ashuran; Ko: 아수라, asura; Tw: A-siu-lô; Vi: A Tu La
atman literally "self", sometimes "soul" or "ego". In Buddhism, the predominant teaching is the negating doctrine of anatman, that there is no permanent, persisting atman, and that belief in atman is the prime consequence of ignorance, the foundation of samsara	Pāli: atta; Sanskrit: ātman	Bur: အတ္တ atta (IPA: [aʔta̰]); 我; Cn: wǒ; Jp: ga; Ko: 아, a; Tw: ngó͘; Vi: ngã
Avalokitesvara, lit. "One Who Hears the Suffering Cries of the World", The bodhisattva of compassion (see also Guan Yin)	Sanskrit: Avalokiteśvara; Bur: လောကနတ် lawka nat (IPA: [lɔ́ka̰ naʔ])	Tib: སྤྱན་རས་གཟིགས་ spyan ras gzigs; Mn: Жанрайсиг, Janraisig; 觀世音 or 觀音; Cn: Guānshì Yīn or Guān Yīn; Jp: Kanzeon or Kannon; Ko: 관세음, Gwanse-eum or 관음, Gwaneum; Tw: Koan-sè-im or Koan-im; Vi: "Quan Thế Âm Bồ Tát", "Quán Thế Âm Bồ Tát' or "Quan Âm"
avidya "ignorance" or "delusion"	Sanskrit: avidyā pāli: "avijjā	Pāli: avijjā; Bur: အဝိဇ္ဇာ aweizza (IPA: [əweɪʔ zà]); Shan: ဢဝိၵ်ႉၸႃႇ awitsa ([ʔa wik˥ tsaː˨]); Thai: อวิชชา aa-wit-sha; Tib: མ་རིག་པ་ ma rig-pa; 無明; Cn: wúmíng; Jp: mumyō; Ko: 무명, mumyeong; Tw: Bû-bêng; Vi: vô minh

== B ==
Definition	Etymology	In other languages
bardo, lit. "intermediate state" or "in-between state", According to Tibetan tradition, the state of existence intermediate between two lives	Tib: བར་མ་དོའི་སྲིད་པ་ bar ma do'i srid pa	Sanskrit: antarābhava; Mn: зуурд, zuurd; 中有,中陰身; Cn: zhongyǒu; Jp: chūu; Ko: 중유 jungyu or 바르도 bareudo; Vi: trung hữu, trung ấm thân, thân trung-ấm
bhavacakra/bhavacakka A circular symbolic representation of samsara, also known as Wheel of becoming	Pāli: bhavacakka; Sanskrit: bhava-cakra	Bur: ဘဝစက် bawa set (IPA: [bəwa̰ sɛʔ]); Mon: ဘဝစက် ([həwɛ̀ʔ cɛk]); Shan: ၽဝႃႉၸၢၵ်ႈ ([pʰa˩ waː˥ tsaːk˧]); Tib: སྲིད་པའི་འཁོར་ལ; Mn: Орчлонгийн хүрдэн, Orchlongiin khurden; 有輪; Cn: yǒulún; Jp: ariwa; Ko: 유륜, yuryun; Vi: hữu luân
bhante The polite particle used to refer to Buddhist monks in the Theravada tradition. Bhante literally means "Venerable Sir."	Pāli	Bur: ဘန္တေ bhante (IPA: [bàɴdè])
bhava Becoming, being, existing; the 10th link of Pratitya-samutpada	Pāli, Sanskrit: bhava	Bur: ဘဝ bawa (IPA: [bəwa̰]); Mon: ဘဝ ([həwɛ̀ʔ]); Shan: ၽဝႃႉ ([pʰa˩ waː˥]); Thai: ภาวะ pa-wah; 有(十二因緣); Cn: yǒu; Jp: u; Ko: 유, yu; Tw: iú; Vi: hữu (thập nhị nhân duyên)
bhikkhu/bhikshu, lit. "beggar", A Buddhist monk	Pāli: bhikkhu; Sanskrit: bhikṣu	Bur: ဘိက္ခု bheikkhu (IPA: [beɪʔkʰù]); Shan: ၽိၵ်ႈၶူႇ ([pʰik˧ kʰu˨]); Tib: དགེ་སློང་ dge slong; Mn: гэлэн, gelen; Thai: ภิกขุ bhikku; 比丘; Cn: bǐ qiū; Jp: biku; Ko: 비구, bigu or 스님 seunim, also 중, jung (pejorative); Tw: pí-khiu; Vi: tì-kheo
bhikkhuni/bhikshuni A Buddhist nun	from bhikkhu; Pāli: bhikkhuni; Sanskrit: bhikṣuni	Bur: ဘိက္ခုနီ bheikkhuni (IPA: [beɪʔkʰùnì]); Shan: ၽိၵ်ႈၶူႇၼီႇ ([pʰik˧ kʰu˨ ni˨]); Kar: ဘံကူနံ or ဖံဝါ "beegoonee" or "hpeewah"; Tib: དགེ་སློང་མ་ sde slong ma; Mn: гэлэнмаа, gelenmaa; Thai: ภิกษุณี bhiksuni; 比丘尼; Cn: bǐqiūní; Jp: bikuni; Ko: 비구니, biguni, 여승 (女僧), yeoseung; Tw: pí-khiu-nî; Vi: tỉ-khâu-ni, tỉ-khưu-ni or tì-kheo-ni, ni
bija, lit. "seed", A metaphor for the origin or cause of things, used in the teachings of the Yogacara school	Sanskrit: bīja	Bur: ဗီဇ biza (IPA: [bì za̰]); 種子; Cn: zhŏngzi; Jp: shūji; Ko: 종자, jongja; Vi: chủng tử, hạt giống, hột giống
bodhi Awakening or Enlightenment	Pāli, Sanskrit: bodhi	Bur: ဗောဓိ bawdhi (IPA: [bɔ́dḭ]); Shan: ပေႃးထီႉ ([pɔ˦ tʰi˥]); Thai: โพธิ์ poe; Tib: བྱང་ཆུབ byang chub; Mn: бодь, bodi; Tag: Budhi; 菩提; Cn: pútí; Jp: bodai; Ko: 보리, bori; Tw: phô͘-thê; Vi: bồ-đề, giác, giác ngộ
Bodhisattvapiṭaka "The Bodhisattva Basket"	Sanskrit: Bodhisattvapiṭaka	菩薩藏經
Bodhi tree The Sacred Fig (Ficus religiosa) tree under which Gautama reached Enlightenment	from bodhi above	Bur: ဗောဓိညောင် bawdhi nyaung (IPA: [bɔ́ dḭ ɲàʊɴ]); Shan: ၺွင်ႇပေႃးထီႉ ([ɲɔŋ˨ pɔ˦ tʰi˥]); 菩提樹; Cn: Pútíshù; Jp: Bodaiju; Ko: 보리수, Borisu; Vi: Bồ-đề thụ, Bồ-đề thọ, cây Bồ-đề
Bodhicaryāvatāra "Introduction to the Practice of Enlightenment," written by Śāntideva (685-763)	Sanskrit: Bodhicaryāvatāra	菩提行經
bodhicitta The motivation of a bodhisattva	Pāli, Sanskrit: bodhicitta	Bur: ဗောဓိစိတ္တ bawdhi seitta (IPA: [bɔ́dḭ seɪʔ da̰]); Tib: བྱང་ཆུབ་ཀྱི་སེམས་, byang chub kyi sems; Mn: бодь сэтгэл, bodi setgel; 菩提心; Cn: pútíxīn; Jp: bodaishin; Ko: 보리심, borisim; Tw: phô͘-thê-sim; Vi: bồ-đề tâm
bodhisattva One with the intention to become a Buddha in order to liberate all other sentient beings from suffering	Pāli: bodhisatta; Sanskrit: bodhisattva	Bur: ဗောဓိသတ် bawdhi that (IPA: [bɔ́ dḭ θaʔ]); Mon: တြုံ လၟောဝ် ကျာ် ([kraoh kəmo caik]); Thai: โพธิสัตว์ poe-ti-satt; Tib: བྱང་ཆུབ་སེམས་དཔའ, byang chub sems dpaʼ; Mn: бодьсад(ва), bodisad(va); 菩薩; Cn: púsà; Jp: bosatsu; Ko: 보살, bosal; Tw: Phô͘-sat; Vi: bồ-tát
Boghda Holy, living Buddha, living Boddhisattva. The title of Jebtsundamba Khutuktu; also title used with the names of highest Buddhist masters, e.g. boghda Tsongkhapa, Panchen boghda	Shan: ၽၵ်ႈၵဝႃႇ ([pʰak˧ ka˩ waː˨]); Mn: богд, bogd	Tib: བོག་ད་ bogda
Buddha A Buddha; also, the Buddha Siddhārtha Gautama.	from √budh: to awaken; Pāli, Sanskrit: buddha	Bur: ဗုဒ္ဓ bodha (IPA: [boʊʔda̰]); Shan: ပုၵ်ႉထႃႉ ([puk˥ tʰaː˥]); Tib: སངས་རྒྱས sangs rgyas; Mn: бурхан, burhan; 佛, 仏, 仏陀; Cn: fó; Jp: butsu or hotoke or budda; Ko: 불, Bul or 부처, Bucheo; Vi: Phật or Bụt
buddha nature The uncreated and deathless Buddhic element or principle concealed within all sentient beings to achieve Awakening; the innate (latent) Buddha essence (esp. in the Tathagatagarbha sutras, Tendai/Tiantai, Nichiren thought)	Sanskrit: buddha-dhatu, buddha-svabhāva, "tathagata-dhatu", or tathagatagarbha.	佛性, 仏性; Cn: fóxìng; Jp: busshō; Ko: 불성, bulseong; Vi: Phật tính, Phật tánh, Cái tánh sáng-suốt giác-ngộ hoàn-toàn
Buddhism The religion and philosophical tradition based on teachings attributed to the Gautama Buddha, a wandering teacher who lived in ancient India during the 6th or 5th century BCE	from √budh: to awaken; Pāli: buddha-sāsana; Sanskrit: buddha-sāsana	Bur: ဗုဒ္ဓဘာသာ boddha batha (IPA: [boʊʔda̰ bàðà]); Shan: ပုၵ်ႉထႃႉၽႃႇသႃႇ ([puk˥ tʰaː˥ pʰaː˨ sʰaː˨]); Mon: ဗုဒ္ဓဘာသာ ([pùttʰɛ̀ʔ pʰɛ̀asa]); Tib: ནང་བསྟན།; Mn: Бурханы Шашин, Burhanii Shashin; 佛教, 仏教; Cn: Fójiào; Jp: bukkyō; Ko: 불교, bulgyo; Vi: Phật-giáo

== C ==
Definition	Etymology	In other languages
cetana Volition	Pāli: cetana	Bur: စေတနာ sedana (IPA: [sèdənà])
Cetiya A reliquary holding holy objects of veneration	Pāli: cetiya; Sanskrit: caitya	Bur: စေတီ zedi (IPA: [zèdi]); Khmer: Mon: စေတဳ setaow ([cetɔe]); Shan: ၸေႇတီႇ tseti ([tse˨ ti˨]); Sin: චෛත්‍යය chaithya; Thai: เจดีย์ chetiya; Tib: མཆོད་རྟེན༏ mchod rten (chorten); 塔; Zh: Ta; Vi: Tháp; Ko: Tap; Jp: 卒塔婆 sotōba
chanda intention, interest, desire to act, aspiration	Pāli: chanda; Sanskrit: chanda	Tib: འདུན་པ།

== D ==
Definition	Etymology	In other languages
dakini A supernatural female with volatile temperament who serves as a muse for spiritual practice. Dakinis are often depicted naked to represent the truth	Sanskrit: ḍākinī	Tibetan: མཁའ་འགྲོ་མ་, Wylie: mkha' 'gro ma; Mn: дагина, dagina; 空行女, 荼枳尼天; Cn: kong xing mu; Jp: Dakini-ten; Ko: 다키니 dakini or 공행녀 gonghaengnyeo; Vi: không hành nữ
Dalai Lama, lit. "the lama with wisdom like an ocean", secular and spiritual leader of Tibet as nominated by the Mongols	Mn: далай, dalai, lit. "ocean"; Tibetan: ཏཱ་ལའི་བླ་མ་ taa-la'i bla-ma	達賴喇嘛; Cn: Dálài Lǎma; Jp: Darai Rama; Ko: 달라이 라마 dalai nama; Vi: Đạt Lai Lạt Ma or Đạt-lại Lạt-ma
dana Generosity or giving; in Buddhism, it also refers to the practice of cultivating generosity	Pāli, Sanskrit: dāna	Bur: ဒါန dana (IPA: [dàna̰]); Mon: ဒါန ([tɛ̀anɛ̀ʔ]) or ဒါန် ([tàn]); Thai: ทาน taan; 布施; Cn: bùshī; Jp: fuse; Ko: 보시 bosi; Vi: bố thí; Mn: өглөг
deva many different types of non-human beings who share the characteristics of being more powerful, longer-lived, and, in general, living more contentedly than the average human being	Pāli and Sanskrit: deva	Bur: ဒေဝ dewa (IPA: [dèwa̰]); Khmer: ទេព or preah (ព្រះ); Mn: тэнгэр tenger; Mon: ဒေဝတဴ tewetao ([tèwətao]); Shan: တေႇဝႃႇ ([a˨ wɔ˨]); 天; Zh: tiān; Ko: cheon; Jp: ten; Vi: thiên
dependent origination, see Pratityasamutpada	Pāli: paṭicca-samuppāda; Sanskrit: pratītya-samutpāda	Bur: ပဋိစ္စသမုပ္ပါဒ် padeissa thamopad (IPA: [pədeɪʔsa̰ θəmoʊʔpaʔ]); Tib: rten.cing.'brel.bar.'byung.ba; Mn: шүтэн барилдлага shuten barildlaga; 因縁, also 緣起, 縁起; Cn: yīnyuan, also yuánqǐ; Jp: innen, also engi; Ko: 인연 inyeon, also 연기 yeongi; Vi: nhân duyên, duyên khởi
dhamma/dharma Often refers to the doctrines and teachings of the faith, but it may have broader uses. Also, it is an important technical term meaning something like "phenomenological constituent." This leads to the potential for confusion, puns, and double entendres, as the latter meaning often has negative connotations	from √dhṛ: to hold; Pāli: dhamma; Sanskrit: dharma	Bur: ဓမ္မ dhamma (IPA: [dəma̰]); Mon: ဓဝ် ([thò]); Thai: ธรรมะ tharrma; Tibetan: ཆོས་, Wylie: chos; Mn: дээдийн ном, deediin nom; 法; Cn: fă; Jp: hō; Ko: beop; Vi: pháp
dhamma name/dharma name A Dharma name or Dhamma name is a new name traditionally bestowed by a Buddhist monastic, given to newly ordained monks, nuns, and laity during both lay and monastic Buddhist initiation ritual in Mahayana Buddhism and monastic ordination in Theravada Buddhism (where it may also be called a Sangha name). Dhamma names are usually considered aspirational, not descriptive.	from √dhṛ: to hold; Pāli: dhamma; Sanskrit: dharma	Bur: ဘွဲ့ (IPA: [bwɛ̰]); Thai: ฉายา; Mn: номын нэр, nomyn ner; Zh: Traditional: 法名 or 法號; Simplified: 法名 or 法号; Pinyin: fǎmíng or fǎhào; Ja: Kanji: 戒名; Rōmaji: kaimyō; Ko: Hangeul: 법명; Hanja: 法名; RR: beopmyeong
dhammavinaya The dharma and vinaya (roughly "doctrine and discipline") considered together. This term essentially means the whole teachings of Buddhism as taught to monks		Mn: суртгаал номхотгол, surtgaal nomkhotgol
dhammacakka/dharmacakra A symbolic representation of the dharma, also known as the Wheel of Dharma	Sanskrit: dharmacakra; Pāli: dhammacakka	Bur: ဓမ္မစကြာ dhamma sekya (IPA: [dəməsɛʔtɕà]); Tibetan: ཆོས་ཀྱི་འཁོར་ལོ, Wylie: chos kyi ʼkhor lo; Mn: номын хүрдэн, momiin khurden; 法輪; Cn: Fǎlún; Jp: hōrin; Ko: beomnyun; Vi: pháp luân
Dhammapada a versified Buddhist scripture traditionally ascribed to the Buddha	Pāli: dhammapada; Sanskrit: dharmapada	Bur: ဓမ္မပဒ dhammapada (IPA: [dəma̰pəda̰]); 法句經; Chinese: 法句经; pinyin: Fǎjù jīng; Jp: hokkukyō (shin. 法句経); Ko: beopgugyeong; Vi: kinh pháp cú
dhammapala/dharmapala A fearsome deity, known as protector of the Dharma	Sanskrit: dharmapāla; Pāli: dhammapāla	Tib: ཆོས་སྐྱོང་ chos skyong; Mn: догшид, dogshid; хангал, khangal; 護法; Cn: hùfǎ; Jp: gohō; Ko: hobeop; Vi: Hộ Pháp
Dhyana, see jhana	Pāli: jhāna; Sanskrit: dhyāna	Bur: ဈာန် zan (IPA: [zàɴ]); Mon: ဇျာန် ([chàn]); Mn: дияан, diyan; 禪 or 禪那, 禅 or 禅那; Cn: Chán or Chánnà; Jp: Zen or Zenna; Ko: Seon; Vi: Thiền or Thiền-na
Dīpankara Buddha	Pāli: Dīpamkara; Sanskrit: Dīpankara	Bur: ဒီပင်္ကရာ dipankara (IPA: [dìpɪ̀ɴkəɹà]); Thai: พระทีปังกรพุทธเจ้า; 燃燈佛; Cn: Rándēng Fo; Jp: Nentōbutsu; Vi: Nhiên-đăng Phật
doan In Zen, a term for person sounding the bell that marks the beginning and end of Zazen	Japanese: 堂行 dōan	
dokusan A private meeting between a Zen student and the master. It is an important element in Rinzai Zen training, as it provides an opportunity for the student to demonstrate understanding	Japanese: 独参 dokusan	獨參; Cn: dúcān; Ko: dokcham; Vi: độc tham
dudie official certificate for monks and nuns issued by government		度牒; Cn: dùdié; Jp: dochō; Ko: 도첩, docheop; Vi: độ điệp
dukkha Suffering, dissatisfaction, unsatisfactoriness, stress	Pāli: dukkha; Sanskrit: duḥkha	Bur: ဒုက္ခ doukkha (IPA: [doʊʔkʰa̰]); Shan: တုၵ်ႉၶႃႉ ([tuk˥ kʰaː˥]); Thai: ทุกข์ took; Tib: སྡུག་བསྔལ་ sdug bsngal; Mn: зовлон, zovlon; 苦; Cn: kǔ; Jp: ku; Ko: go; Vi: khổ
dveṣa aversion	Sanskrit: dveṣa	瞋
dzogchen The natural, intrinsic state of every sentient being	Tibetan: རྫོགས་པ་ཆེན་པོ་ rdzogs pa chen po	Sanskrit: atiyoga; 大究竟; Cn: dàjiūjìng; Jp: daikukyō; Ko: daegugyeong; Vi: đại cứu cánh

== F ==
Definition	Etymology	In other languages
Five Five-Hundred-Year Periods Five sub-divisions of the three periods following the Buddha's passing (三時繫念 Cn: sānshí; Jp: sanji; Vi: tam thời), significant for many Mahayana adherents: 1. Age of enlightenment (解脱堅固 Cn: jiětuō jiāngù; Jp: gedatsu kengo); 2. Age of meditation (禅定堅固 Cn: chándìng jiāngù; Jp: zenjō kengo) These two ages comprise the Former Day of the Law (正法時期 Cn: zhèngfǎ; Jp: shōbō); 3. Age of reading, reciting, and listening (読誦多聞堅固 Cn: sòngduōwén jiāngù; Jp: dokuju tamon kengo); 4. Age of building temples and stupas (多造塔寺堅固 Cn: duōzào tǎsì jiāngù; Jp: tazō tōji kengo) These two ages comprise the Middle Day of the Law (像法時期 Cn: xiàngfǎ; Jp: zōhō); 5. Age of conflict (闘諍堅固 Cn: zhēng jiāngù; Jp: tōjō kengo), an age characterized by unrest, strife, famine, and other natural and human-made disasters. This age corresponds to the beginning of the Latter Day of the Law (末法時期 Cn: mòfǎ; Jp: mappō) when the (historical) Buddha's teachings would lose all power of salvation and perish (白法隠没 Cn: báifǎméi; Jp: byakuhō onmotsu) and a new Buddha would appear to save the people.; The three periods and the five five-hundred year periods are described in the Sutra of the Great Assembly (大集 Cn: dàjí; Jp: Daishutu-kyō, Daijuku-kyō, Daijikkyō, or Daishukkyō).		五箇五百歲, 五箇五百歳; Cn: 五箇五百歲 wǔ ge wǔbǎi suì; Jp: 五箇の五百歳 go no gohyaku sai; Vi: ??
Four Noble Truths: 1. Truth of dukkha (suffering, anxiety, stress) (Sanskrit: duḥkhāryasatya; Bur: ဒုက္ခ dokkha; Thai: ทุกข์; 苦諦 Cn: kǔdì; Jp: kutai; Vi: khổ đế; Mn: зовлон, zovlon); 2. Truth of the origin (samudaya) of dukkha (Sanskrit: samudayāryasatya; Bur: သမုဒယ thamodaya; Thai: สมุทัย; 集諦 Cn: jídì; Jp: jittai; Vi: tập khổ đế; Mn: зовлонгийн шалтгаан, zovlongiin shaltgaan); 3. Truth of the cessation (nirodha) of dukkha (Sanskrit: duḥkhanirodhāryasatya; Bur: နိရောဓ niyawdha; Thai: นิโรธ; 滅諦 Cn: mièdì; Jp: mettai; Vi: diệt khổ đế; Mn: гэтлэх, getlekh); 4. The path (marga) that leads out of dukkha (Sanskrit: duḥkhanirodhagāminī pratipad; Bur: မဂ် meg; Thai: มรรค; 道諦 Cn: dàodì; Jp: dōtai; Vi: đạo đế; Mn: мөр, mör)		Pāli: cattāri ariya-saccāni; Sanskrit: चत्वारि आर्यसत्यानि catvāry āryasatyāni; Bur: သစ္စာလေးပါး thissa lei ba (IPA: [θɪʔsà lé bá]); Khmr: អរិយសច្ចៈទាំង៤; 四諦, 四聖諦, 苦集滅道; Cn: Sìdì; Jp: shitai, shishōtai, kujūmetsudō; Vi: Tứ diệu đế; Thai: อริยสัจ 4; Mn: Хутагтын дөрвөн үнэн, khutagtiin dörvön unen
fukudo In Zen, term for person who strikes the han	Japanese: 副堂 fukudō	

== G ==
Definition	Etymology	In other languages
gasshō A position used for greeting, with the palms together and fingers pointing upwards in prayer position; used in various Buddhist traditions, but also used in numerous cultures throughout Asia. It expresses greeting, request, thankfulness, reverence and prayer. Also considered a mudra or inkei of Japanese Shingon. See also: Añjali Mudrā, Namaste, Sampeah and Wai. Shaolin monks use half a gassho using only one arm to greet. In Japan, it is used not only during rituals concerning Buddhism but also as a gesture to appease the opposite party when making apologies or asking for permission or favors. In addition, there are cases where a person greets them during a greeting before and after a meal, which is a custom derived from Buddhism. In Shinto, they clap hands together as hands, but then lower their hands, bow and worship (in Shinto worship, they do not share hands).	Japanese: 合掌 gasshō	Sanskrit: anjali; 合掌; Cn: hézhǎng (more common to say 合十 héshí); Vi: hiệp chưởng
Gautama Buddha	Pāli: Gotama; Sanskrit: Gautama	Bur: ဂေါတမ (IPA: [ɡɔ́dəma̰]); 瞿曇 悉達多; Jp: Kudon Shiddatta
geshe A Tibetan Buddhist academic degree in the Gelug tradition, awarded at the conclusion of lengthy studies often lasting nine years or more	Tibetan: དགེ་ཤེས་	Mn: гэвш gevsh; 格西
gongan, lit. "public case", A meditative method developed in the Chán/Seon/Zen traditions, generally consisting of a problem that defies solution by means of rational thought; see koan	Chinese 公案 gōng-àn	公案; Jp: kōan; Ko: gong'an; Tw: kong-àn; Vi: công án
Guan Yin The bodhisattva of compassion in East Asian Buddhism, with full name being Guan Shi Yin. Guan Yin is considered to be the female form of Avalokiteshvara but has been given many more distinctive characteristics.	Chinese 觀音 Guān Yīn or 觀世音 Guān Shì Yīn	觀音 or 觀世音; Jp: Kannon or Kanzeon; Ko: Gwaneum or Gwanse-eum; Tw: Koan-im or Koan-sè-im; Vi: Quan Âm or Quan Thế Âm

== H ==
Definition	Etymology	In other languages
han In Zen monasteries, wooden board that is struck announcing sunrise, sunset and the end of the day	Japanese: 板	
Hinayana, lit. "small vehicle", A coinage by the Mahayana for the Buddhist doctrines concerned with the achievement of Nirvana as a Śrāvakabuddha or a Pratyekabuddha, as opposed to a Samyaksambuddha. While sometime thought as derogatory, it means in fact that the Hinayana doctrine is made to save but 1 individual, the one who follows its teachings, just like a 1 place vehicle, while the Mahayana allow the monk to take other people along with him, like a bus or a great plane.	Sanskrit: hīnayāna	Bur: ဟီနယာန hinayana (IPA: [hḭna̰jàna̰]); 小乘; Cn: Xiǎoshèng; Jp: 小乗 Shōjō; Tw: sió-sēng; Vi: Tiểu thừa; Mn: Бага хөлгөн, Baga hölgön

== I ==
Definition	Etymology	In other languages
Ino, Jp. lit. "bringer of joy to the assembly." Originally from Sanskrit karmadana, lit. bestower of conduct [karma]. In Zen, the supervisor of the meditation hall [sodo]. One of the six senior temple administrators.	Japanese: 維那	

== J ==
Definition	Etymology	In other languages
Jetavana		衹樹給孤獨園
jhana Meditative contemplation; more often associated with śamatha practices than vipaśyana. See also: shamata, samadhi, samapatti	from √dhyā: to think of, to contemplate, meditate on; Pāli: jhāna; Sanskrit: dhyāna	Bur: ဈာန် zan (IPA: [zàɴ]); Mon: ဇျာန် ([chàn]); Thai: ฌาน chaan; Sinhala: ජාන jhāna; 禪 or 禪那, 禅 or 禅那; Cn: Chán or Chánnà; Jp: Zen or Zenna; Ko: Seon; Tw: Siân; Vi: Thiền or Thiền-na; Mn: дияан, diyan
jisha In Zen, a senior priest's attendant	Japanese: 侍者 jisha	
jukai Zen public ordination ceremony wherein a lay student receives certain Buddhist precepts.	Chinese: 受戒, shou jie; Korean: 수계, sugye	

== K ==
Definition	Etymology	In other languages
Kakusandha Buddha	Pāli: Kakusandha; Sanskrit: Krakkucchanda	Bur: ကကုသန် Kakuthan (IPA: [ka̰kṵθàɴ]); 拘留孙佛; Zh: Jūliúsūn Fó; Vi: Câu-lưu-tôn Phật
karma, lit. "action", or more specifically, an action that is driven by intention (cetanā) which leads to future consequences (vipāka). In Buddhist thought, this is a deed done deliberately through body, speech or mind, which leads to residual effects in the present or future. It is a central belief within the Buddhist tradition and is synonymous with causality (cause and effect).	from √kri: to do; Sanskrit: karma; Pāli: kamma	Bur: ကံ kan (IPA: [kàɴ]) or ကြမ္မာ kyamma (IPA: [tɕəmà]); Mon: ကံ ([kɔm]); Shan: ၵျၢမ်ႇမႃႇ ([kjaːm˨ maː˨]) or ၵၢမ်ႇ ([kaːm˨]); Thai: กรรม gum; Tib: ལས, las; Mn: үйлийн үр, uiliin ür; 業¹, 因果²; Cn: ¹yè, comm.: ²yīnguǒ; Jp: gō, inga; Ko: 업 eob; Vi: nghiệp
Karmasiddhiprakaraṇa	Sanskrit: Karmasiddhiprakaraṇa	大乘成業論
Kassapa Buddha	Pāli: Kassapa; Sanskrit: Kasyapa	Bur: ကဿပ Kathapa (IPA: [kaʔθəpa̰]); 迦葉佛; Cn: Jiāyè Fó; Jp: Kashōbutsu; Vi: Ca-diếp Phật
kensho In Zen, enlightenment; has the same meaning as satōri, but is customary used for an initial awakening experience	Japanese: 見性 kenshō	見性; Cn: jiànxìng; Tw: kiàn-sèng; Vi: kiến tính, kiến tánh
khyenpo, also khenpo, An academic degree similar to a doctorate in theology, philosophy, and psychology	Tibetan	
khanti patience	Pali: khanti	Bur: ခန္တီ khanti (IPA: [kʰàɴ dì]); Shan: ၶၼ်ႇထီႇ ([kʰan˨ tʰi˨]); Thai: ขันติ kanti; 忍; Cn: rěn, 忍辱 rěnrù, 孱提 chántí; Tw: jím; Vi: nhẫn (trong lục ba-la-mật)
kinhin Zen walking meditation	Japanese: 経行 kinhin or kyōgyō	經行; Cn: jīngxíng; Vi: kinh hành
koan A story, question, problem or statement generally inaccessible to rational understanding, yet may be accessible to Intuition	Japanese: 公案 kōan	公案; Cn: gōng-àn; Ko: gong'an; Vi: công án
kṣaṇa instant	Sanskrit: kṣaṇa	剎那; Cn: 刹那 chànà; Jp: 刹那 setsuna; Ko: 찰나 challa; Tw: 剎那 chhat-ná; Vi: sát na
kṣaṇasaṃpad opportune birth, born at a time when either a Buddha is living and teaching on earth or when a Buddha's teaching is available	Sanskrit: kṣaṇasaṃpad	
ksanti The practice of exercising patience toward behaviour or situations that might not necessarily deserve it—it is seen as a conscious choice to actively give patience as a gift, rather than being in a state of oppression in which one feels obligated to act in such a way.	Sanskrit: kṣānti	忍, 忍辱; Cn: rěn, 忍辱 rěnrù, 孱提 chántí; Jp: 忍辱 ninniku; Tw: jím; Vi: nhẫn (trong lục ba-la-mật)
Kṣitigarbha "Earth Store," one of the eight great Bodhisattvas.	Sanskrit: Kṣitigarbha	地藏菩薩
Kṣitigarbhasūtra "The Scripture on Kṣitigarbha"	Sanskrit: Kṣitigarbhasūtra	地藏菩薩本願經
kleśa afflictions	Sanskrit: kleśa	煩惱
Koṇāgamana Buddha	Pāli and Sanskrit: Koṇāgamana	Bur: ကောဏာဂုံ Kawnagon (IPA: [kɔ́nəɡòʊɴ]); 拘那含佛; Zh: Jūnàhán Fó; Vi: Câu-na-hàm-mâu-ni Phật
Kumbhāṇḍa	Sanskrit: Kumbhāṇḍa; Pāli: Kumbhaṇḍa	Thai: กุมภัณฑ์ gum-pan; Tib: གྲུལ་བུམ་ (grul bum); 鳩槃荼 or 鳩盤拏; Ko: 구반다 gubanda; Zh: Jiū pán tú; Jp: kubanda; Vi: Cưu bàn trà
kuśalakarmapatha wholesome courses of action	Sanskrit: kuśalakarmapatha	
kuśalamūla roots of virtue, wholesome faculties;	Sanskrit: kuśalamūla	善根
kyosaku In Zen, a flattened stick used to strike the shoulders during zazen, to help overcome fatigue or reach satori	Japanese: 警策 kyōsaku, called keisaku in Rinzai	香板; Cn: xiangban; kr: jukbi(죽비)

== L ==
Definition	Etymology	In other languages
lakṣaṇa characteristics, marks	Sanskrit: lakṣaṇa	相
Lam rim chen mo "Great Treatise on the Stages of the Path" written by Guru Tsongkhapa in 1402		菩提道次廣論
Lalitavistara	Tibetan: Rgya cher rol pa	方廣大莊嚴經 / 普曜經
lama A Tibetan teacher or master; equivalent to Sanskrit "guru"	Tibetan: བླ་མ་ bla ma	Sanskrit: guru; 喇嘛; Cn: lǎma; Jp: rama; Vi: lạt-ma; Mn: лам, lam
lineage The official record of the historical descent of dharma teachings from one teacher to another; by extension, may refer to a tradition		傳承

== M ==
Definition	Etymology	In other languages
Mahābodhi Temple - "Temple of the Great Awakening", the great stūpa at Bodhgayā where Shakyamuni Buddha attain enlightenment.		大菩提寺
Madhyamaka Buddhist philosophical school, founded by Nagarjuna. Members of this school are called Madhyamikas	Sanskrit: mādhyamika	Tib: དབུ་མ་པ་ dbu ma pa; Mn: төв үзэл, töv üzel; 中觀宗, 中観派; Cn: Zhōngguānzōng; Jp: Chūganha; Vi: Trung quán tông
mahabhuta four great elements in traditional Buddhist thought	Pāli and Sanskrit: Mahābhūta	Bur: မဟာဘုတ် Mahabhot (IPA: [məhà boʊʔ]); 四大
mahamudra A method of direct introduction the understanding of sunyata, of samsara and that the two are inseparable	Sanskrit: mahāmudrā	Bur: မဟာမုဒြာ maha modra (IPA: [məhà moʊʔdɹà]); Tib: ཕྱག་རྒྱ་ཆེན་པོ་ chag-je chen-po; Mn: махамудра, mahamudra; 大手印; Cn: dàshŏuyìn; Jp: daishuin; Vi: đại thủ ấn
Mahāprajñāpāramitāsūtra "Sutra on the Great Perfection of Wisdom"	Sanskrit: Mahāprajñāpāramitāsūtra	大般若波羅蜜多經
mahasiddha litt. great spiritual accomplishment. A yogi in Tantric Buddhism, often associated with the highest levels of enlightenment	Sanskrit: mahāsiddha	Bur: မဟာသိဒ္ဒ maha theidda (IPA: [məhà θeɪʔda̰]); Thai: มหายาน; 大成就; Cn: dàchéngjiù; Jp: daijōju; Vi: đại thành tựu
Mahāvadānasūtra	Sanskrit: Mahāvadānasūtra	大本經
Mahayana, lit. "great vehicle", A major branch of Buddhism practiced in China, Tibet, Japan, Korea, Vietnam, and Taiwan. Main goal is to achieve buddhahood or samyaksambuddha	Sanskrit: mahāyāna	Bur: မဟာယာန mahayana (IPA: [məhàjàna̰]); 大乘 or 大乗; Cn: Dàshèng; Jp: Daijō; Vi: Đại thừa; Mn: Ikh khölgön
Maitreya The Buddha of the future epoch	Pāli: Metteyya; Sanskrit: Maitreya	Bur: အရိမေတ္တေယျ arimetteya (IPA: [əɹḭmèdja̰]); Shan: ဢရီႉမိတ်ႈတေႇယႃႉ ([ʔa˩ ri˥ mit˧ ta˨ jɔ˥]); Tib: བྱམས་པ, byams pa; Mn: Майдар, maidar; 彌勒 or 彌勒佛, 弥勒 or 弥勒仏; Cn: Mílè or Mílè Fó; Jp: Miroku or Miroku-butsu; Vi: Di-lặc or Phật Di-lặc
makyo In Zen, unpleasant or distracting thoughts or illusions that occur during zazen	Japanese: 魔境 makyō	Vi: ma chướng
Māna conceit, arrogance, misconception	Pāli and Sanskrit: Māna	Bur: မာန mana (IPA: [màna̰]); Mon: မာန် man ([màn]); Shan: မႃႇၼႃႉ ([maː˨ naː˥]); 慢; Jp: man
manas-vijñāna seventh of the eight counsciousnesses	Sanskrit: manas-vijñāna	末那識; Cn: Mònàshí
mandala a spiritual and ritual symbol representing the Universe	Sanskrit: मण्डल Maṇḍala (lit. "circle")	曼荼羅; Cn: màntúluó; Jp: mandara; Vi: mạn-đà-la
maṅgala auspiciousness	Sanskrit: maṅgala	吉祥
mantra Chant used primarily to aid concentration, to reach enlightenment. The best-known Buddhist mantra is possibly Om mani padme hum	Sanskrit: mantra	Thai: มนตร์ moan; Mn: маань, тарни; maani, tarni; 咒, 真言; Cn: zou; Jp: shingon, ju; Vi: chân âm, thần chú
Mappo The "degenerate" Latter Day of the Law. A time period supposed to begin 2,000 years after Sakyamuni Buddha's passing and last for "10,000 years"; follows the two 1,000-year periods of Former Day of the Law (正法 Cn: zhèngfǎ; Jp: shōbō) and of Middle Day of the Law (像法 Cn: xiàngfǎ; Jp: zōhō). During this degenerate age, chaos will prevail and the people will be unable to attain enlightenment through the word of Sakyamuni Buddha. See the Three periods	Japanese: 末法 mappō	末法; Cn: mòfǎ; Vi: mạt pháp
merit	Pāli: puñña; Sanskrit: puṇya	Bur: ကုသိုလ် kutho (IPA: [kṵðò]); Mon: ကုသဵု ([kaoʔsɒ]) or ပိုန် ([pɒn]); Shan: ပုင်ႇၺႃႇ ([puŋ˨ ɲaː˨]) or ၵူႉသူဝ်ႇ ([ku˥ sʰo˨]) or ၵူႉသလႃႉ ([ku˥ sʰa˩ laː˥]); 功徳; Jp: kudoku
mettā loving kindness	Pāli: mettā; Sanskrit: maitrī	Bur: မေတ္တာ myitta (IPA: [mjɪʔtà]); Mon: မေတ္တာ ([mètta]); Shan: မိတ်ႈတႃႇ ([mit˧ taː˨]) or မႅတ်ႈတႃႇ ([mɛt˧ taː˨]); Thai: เมตตา metta; Tib: བྱམས་པ་ byams pa; 慈; Ch: Cí; Jp: ji; Vi: từ
Middle Way The practice of avoidance of extreme views and lifestyle choices	Pāli: majjhimāpaṭipadā; Sanskrit: madhyamāpratipad	Bur: မဇ္ဇိမပဋိပဒါ myizima badi bada (IPA: [mjɪʔzḭma̰ bədḭ bədà]); 中道; Ch: zhōngdào; Jp: chūdō; Vi: trung đạo; Mn: дундаж зам мөр, dundaj zam mör
(right) mindfulness The practice whereby a person is intentionally aware of his or her thoughts and actions in the present moment, non-judgmentally. The 7th step of the Noble Eightfold Path		Pāli: (sammā)-sati; Sanskrit: (samyag)-smṛti; Bur: သတိ thadi (IPA: [ðadḭ]); Thai: สัมมาสติ samma-sati; 正念; Cn: zhèngniàn; Jp: shōnen; Vi: chính niệm, chánh niệm
moksha Liberation	Sanskrit: mokṣa	Pāli: vimutti; Bur: ဝိမုတ္တိ wimouti (IPA: [wḭmoʊʔtḭ]); 解脱; Cn: jiětuō; Jp: gedatsu; Vi: giải thoát
mokugyo A wooden drum carved from one piece, usually in the form of a fish	Japanese: 木魚 mokugyo	木魚; Cn: mùyú; Vi: mõ
mondo In Zen, a short dialogue between teacher and student	Japanese: 問答 mondō	問答; Cn: wèndǎ; Vi:
mudra lit. "seal", A gesture made with hands and fingers in meditation	Sanskrit: mudrā	Bur: မုဒြာ modra (IPA: [moʊʔdɹà]); Tib: ཕྱག་རྒྱ་ phyag rgya; Mn: чагжаа, chagjaa; 手印; Cn: sohyìn (commonly only yìn); Jp: shuin; Vi: ấn

== N ==
Definition	Etymology	In other languages
namo An exclamation showing reverence; devotion. Often placed in front of the name of an object of veneration, e.g., a Buddha's name or a sutra (Nam(u) Myōhō Renge Kyō), to express devotion to it. Defined in Sino-Japanese as 帰命 kimyō: to base one's life upon, to devote (or submit) one's life to Derivatives: Namo Amitabha	Pāli: namo; Sanskrit: namaḥ or namas; Derivatives: Sanskrit: namo-'mitābhāya	Bur: နမော namaw (IPA: [nəmɔ́]); Tib: ཕྱག་འཚལ་(ལོ), chag tsal (lo); Mn: мөргөмү, mörgömü; 南無; Cn: nánmó; Jp: namu or nam; Ko: namu; Vi: nam-mô; Derivatives: 南無阿弥陀佛; Cn: Nánmó Ēmítuó fó; Jp: Namu Amida butsu; Ko: Namu Amita Bul; Vi: Nam-mô A-di-đà Phật; 南無觀世音菩薩; Cn: Nánmó Guán Syr Yín Pū Sá; Jp: Namu Kanzeon Bosatsu; Ko: Namu Gwan Se Eum Bo Sal; Vi: Nam-mô Quan Thế Âm Bồ Tát
Naraka realm of hell	Pāli: niraya; Sanskrit: nāraka	地獄; Cn: Dìyù
nekkhamma renunciation	Pāli: Sanskrit:	Bur: နိက္ခမ neikhama (IPA: [neɪʔkʰəma̰]); Thai: เนกขัมมะ nekkamma; Mn: магад гарахуй, magad garahui; 出世; Cn: Chūshì; Jp: shusse; Vi: xuất thế
Nirvana/Nibbana Extinction or extinguishing; ultimate enlightenment in the Buddhist tradition	from niḥ-√vā: to extinguish; Pāli: nibbāna; Sanskrit: nirvana	Bur: နိဗ္ဗာန် neibban (IPA: [neɪʔbàɴ]); Thai: นิพพาน nípphaan; Tib: མྱ་ངན་ལས་འདས་པ, mya-ngan-las-'das-pa; Mn: нирван, nirvan; 涅槃; Cn: Nièpán; Jp: Nehan; Ko: Yeolban; Vi: Niết-bàn
Nikaya, lit. "volume", The Buddhist texts in Pāli	Pāli: nikāya	Sanskrit: Āgama; Bur: နိကာယ nikaya (IPA: [nḭkəja̰]); 部經; Cn: Bùjīng; Jp: bukyō; Vi: Bộ kinh
Noble Eightfold Path: 1. Right View (Pāli: sammā-diṭṭhi; Sanskrit: samyag-dṛṣṭi; 正見 Cn: zhèngjiàn; Vi: chính kiến); 2. Right Thought (Pāli: sammā-saṅkappa; Sanskrit: samyak-saṃkalpa; 正思唯 Cn: zhèngsīwéi; Vi: chính tư duy) These 2 constitute the path of Wisdom (Pāli: paññā; Sanskrit: prajñā); 3. Right Speech (Pāli: sammā-vācā; Sanskrit: samyag-vāk; 正語 Cn: zhèngyǔ; Vi: chính ngữ); 4. Right Action (Pāli: sammā-kammanta; Sanskrit: samyak-karmānta; 正業 Cn: zhèngyè; Vi: chính nghiệp); 5. Right Living (Pāli: sammā-ājīva; Sanskrit: samyag-ājīva; 正命 Cn: zhèngmìng; Vi: chính mệnh) These 3 constitute the path of Virtue (Pāli: sīla; Sanskrit: śīla); 6. Right Effort (Pāli: sammā-vāyāma; Sanskrit: samyag-vyāyāma; 正精進 Cn: zhèngjīngjìn; Vi: chính tinh tiến); 7. Right Mindfulness (Pāli: sammā-sati; Sanskrit: samyag-smṛti; 正念 Cn: zhèngniàn; Vi: chính niệm); 8. Right Concentration (Pāli: sammā-samādhi; Sanskrit: samyak-samādhi; 正定 Cn: zhèngdìng; Vi: chính định) The last 3 constitute the path of Concentration (Pāli, Sanskrit: samādhi)	Pāli: aṭṭhāṅgika-magga; Sanskrit: aṣṭāṅgika-mārga	Bur: မဂ္ဂင် meggin (IPA: [mɛʔɡɪ̀ɴ]); Thai: อริยมรรค ariya-mak; 八正道; Cn: Bāzhèngdào; Jp: Hasshōdō; Ko: Paljeongdo; Vi: Bát chính đạo

== O ==
Definition	Etymology	In other languages
oryoki A set of bowls used in a Zen eating ceremony	Japanese: 応量器 ōryōki	
osho A term used to address a monk of the Zen Buddhist tradition. Originally reserved for high-ranking monks, it has since been appropriated for everyday use when addressing any male member of the Zen clergy	Japanese: 和尚 oshō	

== P ==
Definition	Etymology	In other languages
pabbajja, (a layperson) leaving home to join a community of monks and nuns (lit. "to go forth")	Sanskrit: pravrajya; Pali: Pabbajja	出家; Cn: chūjiā; Jp: shukke; Vi: xuất gia
panca skandha The five constituent elements into which an individual is analyzed. They are: 1. "form": Pāli, Sanskrit: rūpa; Bu: ရူပ yupa; 色 Cn: sè; Jp: shiki 2. "sensation": Pāli, Sanskrit: vedanā; Bu: ဝေဒန wedana; 受 Cn: shòu; Jp: ju 3. "cognition": Pāli: saññā; Sanskrit: saṃjñā; Bu: သညာ thinnya; 想 Cn: xiàng; Jp: sō 4. "mental formations": Pāli: saṅkhāra; Sanskrit: saṃskāra; Bu: သင်္ခါရ thinkhaya; 行 Cn: xíng; Jp: gyō 5. "consciousness": Pāli: viññāṇa; Sanskrit: vijñāna; Bu: ဝိညာဉ် winyin; 識 Cn: shí; Jp: shiki	Sanskrit: pañca skandha; Pāli: pañca khandha	Bur: ခန္ဒာငါးပါး khanda nga ba (IPA: [kʰàɴdà ŋá bá]); Shan: ႁႃႈ ၶၼ်ႇထႃႇ ([haː˧ kʰan˨ tʰaː˨]); 五蘊, 五陰, 五薀; Cn: wǔyùn; Jp: go-on, sometimes go-un; Vi: ngũ uẩn
Panchen Lama The second highest ranking lama in the Gelugpa sect of Tibetan Buddhism. after the Dalai Lama	Tibetan: པན་ཆེན་བླ་མ་ pan-chen bla-ma	Sanskrit: paṇḍitaguru; Mn: Банчин Богд, Banchin Bogd; 班禪喇嘛; Cn: Bānchán Lǎma; Jp: ??; Vi: Ban-thiền Lạt-ma
paññā, see prajna	Sanskrit:	Bur: ပညာ pyinnya (IPA: [pjɪ̀ɴɲà]); Mon: ပညာ ([pɔnɲa]); Shan: ပိင်ႇၺႃႇ ([piŋ˨ ɲaː˨]); Tibetan: ཤེས་རབ་ shes rab; Mn: билиг, bilig; 智慧 or 知恵 or 般若; Cn: Zhìhuì, zhīhuì, bōrě; Jp: chie,hannya; Vi: bát-nhã
paramartha Absolute, as opposed to merely conventional, truth or reality; see also samvrti	Sanskrit: paramārtha	Bur: ပရမတ် paramat (IPA: [pəɹəmaʔ]); Thai: ปรมัตถ์ paramutt; 真諦; Jp: shintai
paramita, lit. "reaching the other shore," usually rendered in English as "perfection." The Mahayana practices for obtaining enlightenment; giving, ethics, patience, effort, concentration and wisdom	Pāli: pāramī; Sanskrit: pāramitā	Bur: ပါရမီ parami (IPA: [pàɹəmì]); Mon: ပါရမဳ ([parəmɔe]); Thai: บารมี baramee; Mn: барамид, baramid; 波羅蜜 or 波羅蜜多; Cn: bōluómì or bōluómìduō; Jp: haramitsu or haramita; Vi: ba-la-mật or ba-la-mật-đa
parinibbana/parinirvana The final nibbana/nirvana	from nibbana/nirvana above; Pāli: parinibbāna; Sanskrit: parinirvāṇa	Bur: ပရိနိဗ္ဗာန် pareineibban (IPA: [pəɹeɪʔneɪʔbàɴ]); Thai: ปรินิพพาน pari-nippaan; 般涅槃; Cn: bōnièpán; Jp: hatsunehan; Vi: bát-niết-bàn
Perfection of Wisdom	from pāramitā ("perfection") above and prajñā/paññā ("wisdom") below; Sanskrit: prajñāpāramitā; Pāli: paññāparami	Bur: ပညာပါရမီ pyinnya parami (IPA: [pjɪ̀ɴɲà pàɹəmì]); Mon: ပညာပါရမဳ ([pɔnɲa parəmɔe]); Mn: билиг барамид, bilig baramid; 般若波羅蜜 or 般若波羅蜜多; Cn: bōrě-bōluómì or bōrě-bōluómìduō; Jp: hannya-haramitsu or hannya-haramita; Vi: bát-nhã-ba-la-mật or bát-nhã-ba-la-mật-đa
Platform Sūtra of the Sixth Patriarch Sermon of the sixth patriarch of Zen Buddhism		六祖壇經
Pointing-out instruction The direct introduction to the nature of mind in the lineages of Essence Mahamudra and Dzogchen. A root guru is the master who gives the 'pointing-out instruction' so that the disciple recognizes the nature of mind	Tibetan: ངོ་སྤྲོད་ ngo-sprod	
prajna/paññā "wisdom", "insight"	Pāli: paññā; Sanskrit: prajñā	Bur: ပညာ pyinnya (IPA: [pjɪ̀ɴɲà]); Thai: ปัญญา pun-ya; Tibetan: ཤེས་རབ་ shes rab; Mn: хөтлөх, khötlökh; 般若; Cn: bōrě or bānruò; Jp: hannya; Vi: bát-nhã
pratisaraṇa "reliance"	Sanskrit: pratisaraṇa	依
pratitya-samutpada "Dependent origination," the view that no phenomenon exists (or comes about) without depending on other phenomena or conditions contingent with it. In English also called "conditioned genesis," "dependent co-arising," "interdependent arising," etc. A famous application of dependent origination is the Twelve Nidana, or 12 inter-dependences (Sanskrit: dvādaśāṅgapratītyasamutpāda; 十二因緣, 十二因縁 Cn: shíàr yīnyuán; Jp: jūni innen; Vi: thập nhị nhân duyên), which are: 1. Ignorance (Pāli: avijjā; Sanskrit: avidyā; 無明 Cn: wúmíng; Jp: mumyō; Vi: vô minh; Mn: мунхрахуй, munhrahui); 2. Ignorance creates Mental Formation (Pāli: saṅkhāra; Sanskrit: saṃskāra; 行 Cn: xíng; Jp: gyō; Vi: hành; Mn: хуран үйлдэхүй, khuran uildehui); 3. Mental Formation creates Consciousness (Pāli: viññāṇa; Sanskrit: vijñāna; 識 Cn: shí; Jp: shiki; Vi: thức; Mn: тийн мэдэхүй, tiin medehui); 4. Consciousness creates Name & Form (Pāli, Sanskrit: nāmarūpa; 名色 Cn: míngsè; Jp: myōshiki; Vi: danh sắc; Mn: нэр өнгө, ner öngö); 5. Name & Form create Sense Gates (Pāli: saḷāyatana; Sanskrit: ṣaḍāyatana; 六入 or 六処 Cn: liùrù; Jp: rokunyū or rokusho; Vi: lục nhập; Mn: төрөн түгэхүй, törön tugehui); 6. Sense Gates create Contact (Pāli: phassa; Sanskrit: sparśa; 觸, 触 Cn: chù; Jp: soku; Vi: xúc; Mn: хүрэлцэхүй, khureltsehui); 7. Contact creates Feeling (Pāli, Sanskrit: vedanā; 受 Cn: shòu; Jp: ju; Vi: thụ; Mn: сэрэхүй, serehui); 8. Feeling creates Craving (Pāli: taṇhā; Sanskrit: tṛṣṇā; 愛 Cn: ài; Jp: ai; Vi: ái; Mn: хурьцахуй, khuritsahui); 9. Craving creates Clinging (Pāli, Sanskrit: upādāna; 取 Cn: qǔ; Jp: shu; Vi: thủ; Mn: авахуй, avahui); 10. Clinging creates Becoming (Pāli, Sanskrit: bhava; 有 Cn: yǒu; Jp: u; Vi: hữu; Mn: сансар, sansar); 11. Becoming creates Birth (Pāli, Sanskrit: jāti; 生 Cn: shēng; Jp: shō; Vi: sinh; Mn: төрөхүй, töröhui ) 12. Birth leads to Aging & Death (Pāli, Sanskrit: jarāmaraṇa; 老死 Cn: láosǐ; Jp: rōshi; Vi: lão tử; Mn: өтлөх үхэхүй, ötlöh uhehui)	Pāli: paṭicca-samuppāda; Sanskrit: pratitya-samutpāda	Bur: ပဋိစ္စသမုပ္ပါဒ် padeissa thamopad (IPA: [pədeɪʔsa̰ θəmoʊʔpaʔ]); Tib: རྟེན་ཅིང་འབྲེལ་བར་འབྱུང་བ་ rten cing `brel bar `byung ba; Mn: шүтэн барилдлага, shuten barildlaga; 緣起 (thought to be an abbreviation for 因緣生起), 縁起; Cn: yuánqǐ; Jp: engi; Tw: iân-khí; Vi: duyên khởi; Also called 因緣, 因縁; Cn: yīnyuán; Jp: innen; Vi: nhân duyên
Pratyekabuddha/Paccekabuddha, lit. "a buddha by his own", A buddha who reaches enlightenment on his own	Pāli: paccekabuddha; Sanskrit: pratyekabuddha	Bur: ပစ္စေကဗုဒ္ဓါ pyiseka boddha (IPA: [pjɪʔsèka̰ boʊʔdà]); 辟支佛; Cn: Bìzhī Fó; Jp: Hyakushibutsu; Tw: phek-chi-hu̍t; Vi: Bích-chi Phật
Pure Land Buddhism A large branch of Mahayana, dominantly in East Asia. The goal of Pure Land Buddhism is to be reborn in the Western sukhavati of Amitabha, either as a real place or within the mind, through the other-power of repeating the Buddha's name, nianfo or nembutsu.		净土宗(Ch), 浄土教(Jp); Cn: Jìngtǔ-zōng; Jp: Jōdo-kyo; Ko: Jeongtojong; Tw: Chēng-thó͘-chong; Vi: Tịnh độ tông
Puruṣa Man (ep. representative of the male gender); human being	Pāli: purisa; Sanskrit: puruṣa	Tib: skyes pa; 人; Ch: rén; Jp: hito

== R ==
Definition	Etymology	In other languages
rebirth The process of continuity of life after death	Pāli: punabbhava; Sanskrit: punarbhava	輪廻; Cn: lunhui; Jp: rinne; Vi: luân hồi
Ratnasambhava	Sanskrit: Ratnasambhava	Tib: རིན་ཆེན་འབྱུང་གནས Rinchen Jung ne; Mn: ᠡᠷᠳᠡᠨᠢ ᠭᠠᠷᠬᠣ ᠢᠢᠨ ᠣᠷᠣᠨ᠂ ᠲᠡᠭᠦᠰ ᠡᠷᠳᠡᠨᠢ; Эрдэнэ гарахын орон, Төгс Эрдэнэ; Erdeni garkhu yin oron, Tegüs Erdeni; 寶生佛, 宝生如来; Jp: Hōshō Nyorai; Vi: Bảo-sanh Như Lai
refuge Usually in the form of "take refuge in the Three Jewels"	Pāli: saraṇa; Sanskrit: śaraṇa	Bur: သရဏဂုံ tharanagon (IPA: [θəɹənəɡòʊɴ]); Mn: аврал, avral; Tib: skyabs; Thai: สรณะ sorana; 歸依; Cn: guīyī; Jp: kie; Tw: kui-i; Vi: quy y
Rigpa, the knowledge that ensues from recognizing one's nature	Tibetan: རིག་པ (rig pa)	Sanskrit: विद्या (vidyā)
Rinpoche, lit. "precious one", An honorific title for a respected Tibetan lama, such as a tulku	Tibetan: རིན་པོ་ཆེ་, rin-po-che	Mn: римбүчий, rimbuchii; 仁波切; Cn: rénbōqiè; Jp: リンポチェ rinpoche; Vi: ??
Rinzai Zen sect emphasizing koan study; named for master Linji Yixuan	Japanese: 臨済宗 Rinzai-shū	臨濟宗; Cn: Línjì-zōng; Vi: Lâm Tế tông
Rohatsu A day traditionally honored as the day of the Buddha's enlightenment. While deep in meditation under a bodhi tree, he attained enlightenment upon seeing the morning star just at dawn; celebrated on the 8th day either of December or of the 12th month of the lunar calendar	Japanese: 臘八 Rōhatsu or Rohachi	
roshi, lit. "Master", An honorific given to Zen teachers in the Rinzai and Obaku sects.	Japanese 老師 Rōshi	禅師; Cn: chan shī (lit., old master)

== S ==
Definition	Etymology	In other languages
sacca truthfulness	Sanskrit: Satya	Burmese: သစ္စာ thissa (IPA: [θɪʔ sà]); Khmer: សច្ចា; UNGEGN: sâchcha; ALA-LC: saccā; IPA: [saccaː]; Mon: သစ္စ ([sɔtcɛʔ]); Shan: သဵတ်ႈၸႃႇ ([sʰet˧ tsaː˨]); Thai: สัจจะ sadja; 真; Cn: zhēn; Jp: shin; Vi:
Saddharmapuṇḍarīkasūtra Lotus Sutra	Sanskrit: Saddharmapuṇḍarīkasūtra	妙法蓮華經 / 法華經; Cn: miàofǎ liánhuá jīng or fǎhuá jīng; Jp: 妙法蓮華経 myōhō renge kyō or 法華経 hokekyō; Tw: Biāu-hoat Liân-hôa Keng or Hoat-hôa-keng
ṣaḍgati "six destinies"	Sanskrit: ṣaḍgati	六趣
samanera/shramanera A male novice monk, who, after a year or until the ripe age of 20, will be considered for the higher Bhikkhu ordination	Sanskrit: śrāmaṇera	Burmese: (ရှင်)သာမဏေ (shin) thamane (IPA: [(ʃɪ̀ɴ) θàmənè]); Khmer: សាមណេរ; UNGEGN: Samônér; ALA-LC: Sāmaṇer; IPA: [saːmaneː]; Mon: သာမ္မဏဳ ([samənɔe]); Shan: သႃႇမၼေႇ ([sʰaː˨ mne˨]); Thai: สามเณร sama-naen; 沙彌; Cn: shāmí; Jp: shami; Tw: sa-bi; Vi: sa-di, chú tiểu
samatha Mental stabilization; tranquility meditation. Distinguished from vipassanā meditation	Pāli: samatha; Sanskrit: śamatha	Bur: သမထ thamahta (IPA: [θəmətʰa̰]); Thai: สมถะ samatha; 止; Cn: zhǐ or 舍摩他 shěmótā; Jp: サマタ samata or シャマタ shamata; Vi: ??
samsara The cycle of birth and rebirth; the world as commonly experienced	Pāli, Sanskrit: saṃsāra	Bur: သံသရာ thanthaya (IPA: [θàɴðəjà]); Thai: สังสารวัฏ sung-sara-wat; Tib: འཁོར་བ khor ba; Bur: သံသရာ; Mn: орчлон, orchlon; 輪迴, 輪廻; Cn: lúnhúi; Jp: rinne; Tw: lûn-hôe; Vi: luân hồi
samu Work, conceived as a part of Zen training.	Japanese: 作務 samu	作務; Cn: zuòwù; Vi: ??
samvrti Conventional, as opposed to absolute, truth or reality; see also paramartha	Sanskrit: saṃvriti	Bur: သမ္မုတိ thamudi (IPA: [θəmṵdḭ]); Thai: สมมุติ sommoot; 俗諦; Jp: zokutai
sangha The community of Buddhist monks and nuns. Teachers and practitioners.	Sanskrit: saṅgha	Bur: သံဃာ thangha (IPA: [θàɴɡà]); Mon: သဳလ ([sɛŋ]); Khmer: សង្ឃ; UNGEGN: sângkh; ALA-LC: sanggh; IPA: [sɑŋ]; Shan: သၢင်ႇၶႃႇ ([sʰaːŋ˨ kʰaː˨]); Thai: สงฆ์ song; Tib: ཚོགས་ཀ་མཆོག tsog gyu chog; Mn: хуврагийн чуулган, khuvragiin chuulgan; 僧團; Cn: sēng tuan; Jp: sō, sōryō; Vi: tăng già
Sanlun Buddhist philosophical school based on the Madhyamaka school	Chinese: 三論 sānlùn	三論宗; Cn: Sānlùnzōng; Jp: Sanron-shū; Vi: Tam luận tông
sanzen A formal interview with a teacher in many traditions of Zen. Similar to dokusan	Japanese	
satori Awakening; understanding. A Japanese term for enlightenment	Japanese: 悟り satori	悟; Cn: wú; Vi: ngộ
sayadaw Burmese meditation master	Bur: ဆရာတော် sayadaw (IPA: [sʰəjàdɔ̀])	
seichu In the Zen Buddhist calendar, a period of intensive, formal monastic training. It is typically characterized by week-long Daisesshins and periodic sanzen	Japanese: 制中 seichu	
sesshin A Zen retreat where practitioners meditate, eat and work together for several days	Japanese: 接心, 摂心	佛七; Cn: fóqī; 坐臘/坐腊; Cn: zuòlà
shikantaza Soto Zen. "Only concentrated on sitting" is the main practice of the Soto school of Japanese Zen Buddhism	Japanese: 只管打座	默照; Cn: mòzhào
shunyata Emptiness; see also Nagarjuna	Pāli: suññatā; Sanskrit: śūnyatā	Bur: သုည (IPA: [θòʊɴɲa̰]); Shan: သုင်ႇၺႃႉ ([sʰuŋ˨ ɲaː˥]); Tib: stong pa nyid; Mn: хоосон чанар, khooson chanar; 空; Cn: kōng; Jp: kū; Tw: khong; Vi: tính Không
Sikhī Buddha Buddha of Knowledge	Pāli: Sikhī Buddha; Sanskrit: Śikhīn Buddha	Jp: Shiki Butsu
sila "morals", "morality", "ethics": precepts	Pāli: sīla; Sanskrit: śīla	Bur: သီလ thila (IPA: [θìla̰]); Khmer: សីល; UNGEGN: seil; ALA-LC: sīl; IPA: [səl]; Mon: သဳ ([sɔelaʔ]); Shan: သီႇလႃႉ ([sʰi˨ laː˥]); Thai: ศีล seen; 尸羅, 戒; Cn: jiè; Jp: kai; Tw: kài; Vi: giới; Mn: шагшаабад, shagshaabad
Sōtō Sect of Zen emphasizing shikantaza as the primary mode of practice; see also Dōgen	Japanese: 曹洞宗 Sōtō-shū	曹洞宗; Cn: Cáodòng-zōng; Vi: Tào Động tông
store consciousness The base consciousness (alayavijnana) taught in Yogacara Buddhism	Pāli, Sanskrit: ālayavijñāna	阿頼耶識; Cn: āyēshí; Jp: arayashiki; Vi: a-lại-da thức
Śrāvastī	Sanskrit: śrāvastī	舍衛國
sukha happiness; ease; pleasure; bliss	Pāli: sukha; Sanskrit: sukha	Bur: သုခ; Khmer: សុខ; UNGEGN: sŏkh; ALA-LC: sukh; IPA: [sok]; Mon: ??; Mn: ??; 樂; Cn: 乐 lè; Jp: 楽 raku; Tw: 樂 lo̍k; Vi: ??
sutra Scripture; originally referred to short aphoristic sayings and collections thereof	from √siv: to sew; Sanskrit: sutra; Pāli: sutta	Bur: သုတ် thoht (IPA: [θoʊʔ]); Khmer: សូត្រ; UNGEGN: sotr; ALA-LC: sūtr; IPA: [soːt]; Mon: သုတ် ([sɔt]); Mon: သုၵ်ႈ ([sʰuk˧]); Thai: สูตร soothe; Mn: судар, sudar; 經, 経; Cn: jīng; Jp: kyō; Tw: keng; Vi: kinh
Śūraṃgamasamādhisūtra	Sanskrit: Śūraṃgamasamādhisūtra	首楞嚴三昧經
Sutra Pitaka The second basket of the Tripiṭaka canon, the collection of all Buddha's teachings	Pāli: Sutta-piṭaka; Sanskrit: Sūtra-piṭaka	Bur: သုတ် thoht (IPA: [θoʊʔ]); Mon: သုတ် ([sɔt]); Mon: သုၵ်ႈ ([sʰuk˧]); Mn: Судрын аймаг Sudriin aimag; 經藏, 経蔵; Cn: jīngcáng; Jp: kyōzō; Vi: Kinh tạng

== T ==
Definition	Etymology	In other languages
tangaryō A period of waiting for admission into a Zen monastery at the gate, lasting anywhere from one day to several weeks—depending on the quality of one's sitting. Refers to the room traveling monks stay in when visiting, or await admittance into the sōdō.	Japanese: 旦過寮	
tanha Craving or desire	Pāli: taṇhā; Sanskrit: tṛṣṇā	Bur: တဏှာ tahna (IPA: [tən̥à]); Khmer: តណ្ហា; UNGEGN: tânha; ALA-LC: taṇhā; IPA: [tɑnhaː]; Thai: ตัณหา tunha; Mn: хурьцахуй, khuritsahui; 愛; Cn: ài; Jp: ai; Kr: 애 ae; Tw: ài; Vi: ái
Tanto In Zen, one of the main temple leaders, lit."head of the tan." In a Zen temple, the Tanto is one of two officers (with the Godo) in charge monks' training.	Japanese:単頭	
tantra Esoteric religious practices, including yoga, mantra, etc. See also Vajrayana.	Sanskrit: tantra	Mn: тарнийн ёс, дандар, tarniin yos, dandar; Cn: 续部 xùbù, 密续 mìxù, 怛特罗 dátèluó; Jp: タントラ tantora; Vi: đát-đặc-la
Tathagata one of the Buddha's ten epithets	Sanskrit: tathāgata; The "Thus-Gone One"	Bur: တထာဂတ tahtagata (IPA: [ta̰tʰàɡəta̰]); Khmer: តថាគត; UNGEGN: tâthakôt; ALA-LC: tathāgat; IPA: [tatʰaːkɔt]; Thai: ตถาคต tatha-kohd; Mn: түүнчлэн ирсэн, tuunchlen irsen; 如来; Cn: rúlái; Jp: nyorai; Tw: Jû-lâi; Vi: như lai
tathagatagarbha Buddha-nature or the seed of enlightenment	Sanskrit: tathāgatagarbha	佛性, 仏性; Cn: fóxìng; Jp: busshō; Also 覚性; Cn: juéxìng; Jp: kakushō; Vi: giác tính; Also 如来藏, 如来蔵; Cn: rúláizàng; Jp: nyuoraizō; Vi: như lai tạng
teisho A presentation by a Zen master during a sesshin. Rather than an explanation or exposition in the traditional sense, it is intended as a demonstration of Zen realisation	Japanese: 提唱 teishō	
tenzo In Zen, the head cook for a sesshin. In Zen temples, the officer in charge of the kitchen	Japanese: 典座 tenzo	典座; Cn: diǎnzuò; Vi: điển toạ
Tevijja Sutta Discourse of the Three-fold Knowledge	Sanskrit: Tevijjasutta	三明經
Theravada, lit. "words of the elders", Most popular form of Buddhism in Southeast Asia and Sri Lanka.	Pāli: theravāda; Sanskrit: sthaviravāda	Bur: ထေရဝါဒ hterawada (IPA: [tʰèɹa̰wàda̰] or [tʰèja̰wàda̰]); Khmer: ថេរវាទ; UNGEGN: thérôvéat; ALA-LC: theravād; IPA: [tʰeːraviət]; Thai: เถรวาท tera-waad; 上座部; Cn: shàngzuòbù; Jp: jōzabu; Vi: Thượng toạ bộ
thera or their, lit. "elder", Honorific applied to senior monks and nuns in the Theravada tradition.	Pāli: thera	Bur: ထေရ htera (IPA: [tʰèɹa̰])
Three Jewels Three things that Buddhists take refuge in: the Buddha, his teachings (Dharma) and the community of realized practitioners (Sangha), and in return look toward for guidance (see also Refuge (Buddhism))	Pāli: tiratana; Sanskrit: triratna	Bur: သရဏဂုံသုံးပါး tharanagon thon ba (IPA: [θəɹənəɡòʊɴ θóʊɴ bá]) OR ရတနာသုံးပါး yadana thon ba ([jədənà θóʊɴ bá)]); Khmer: ត្រៃរតនៈ; UNGEGN: trairôtâneă; ALA-LC: trairatană; IPA: [trajratanaʔ]; Thai: ไตรรัตน์ trai-rut; Tib: དཀོན་མཆོག་གསུམ, dkon mchog gsum; Mn: чухаг дээд гурав chuhag deed gurav; 三寶; Cn: sānbăo; Jp: sanbō; Vi: tam bảo
Three periods: Three divisions of the time following the historical Buddha's passing: the Former (or Early) Day of the Law (正法 Cn: zhèngfǎ; Jp: shōbō), the first thousand years; the Middle Day of the Law (像法 Cn: xiàngfǎ; Jp: zōhō), the second thousand years; and the Latter Day of the Law (末法 Cn: mòfǎ; Jp: mappō), which is to last for 10,000 years.; The three periods are significant to Mahayana adherents, particularly those who hold the Lotus Sutra in high regard; e.g., Tiantai (Tendai) and Nichiren Buddhists, who believe that different Buddhist teachings are valid (i.e., able to lead practitioners to enlightenment) in each period due to the different capacity to accept a teaching (機根 Cn: jīgēn; Jp: kikon) of the people born in each respective period.; The three periods are further divided into five five-hundred year periods (五五百歳 Cn: wǔ wǔbǎi suì; Jp: go no gohyaku sai), the fifth and last of which was prophesied to be when the Buddhism of Sakyamuni would lose all power of salvation and a new Buddha would appear to save the people. This time period would be characterized by unrest, strife, famine, and other, natural disasters.; The three periods and the five five-hundred year periods are described in the Sutra of the Great Assembly (大集経 Cn: dàjí jīng; Jp: Daishutu-kyō, Daijuku-kyō, Daijikkyō, or Daishukkyō). Descriptions of the three periods also appear in other sutras, some of which ascribe different lengths of time to them (although all agree that Mappō will last for 10,000 years).		三時; Cn: Sānshí; Jp: Sanji; Vi: Tam thời
Three Poisons or Three Fires The three primary causes of unskillful action that lead to the creation of "negative" karma; the three root kleshas: 1. Attachment (Pāli: lobha; Sanskrit: rāga; Tib.: འདོད་ཆགས་ 'dod chags); 2. Aversion (Pali: doha; Sanskrit: dveṣa; Tib.: ཞེ་སྡང་ zhe sdang; Mn: урин хилэн, urin khilen; 瞋 Cn: chēn; Jp: jin; Vi: sân); 3. Ignorance (Pāli: moha; Sanskrit: moha; Tib.: གཏི་མུག་ gti mug)	Pāli: kilesa (Defilements); Sanskrit: kleśa	Sanskrit: triviṣa; Tib: düsum (Wylie: dug gsum); Bur: မီးသုံးပါး mi thon ba (IPA: [mí θóʊɴ bá]); Mn: гурван хор, gurvan khor; 三毒; Cn: Sāndú; Jp: Sandoku; Vi: Tam độc
Tiantai/Tendai A Mahayana school of China that teaches the supremacy of the Lotus Sutra	Chinese: 天台 tiāntái	天台宗; Cn: tiāntái zōng; Jp: tendai-shū; Vi: Thiên Thai tông
trailõkya The 3 "regions" of the world: 1. Kamaloka or Kamadhatu: world of desires (Sanskrit, Pāli: kāmaloka, kāmadhātu; Tibetan: འདོད་ཁམས་ `dod khams; Mn: амармагийн орон, amarmagiin oron; 欲界 Cn: yùjiè, Jp: yokkai Vi: dục giới); 2. Rupaloka or Rupadhatu: world of form (Sanskrit: rūpaloka, rūpadhātu; Tibetan: གཟུགས་ཁམས་ gzugs khams; Mn: дүрстийн орон, durstiin oron; 色界 Cn: sèjiè; Jp: shikikai , Vi: sắc giới); 3. Arupaloka or Arupadhatu: world without form or desire (Sanskrit: arūpaloka, arūpadhātu; Tibetan: གཟུགས་མེད་ཁམས་ gzugs med khams; Mn: дүрсгүйн орон, dursquin oron; 無色界 Cn: wú sèjiè, Jp: mushikikai Vi: vô sắc giới)	Sanskrit: triloka	Pāli: tisso dhātuyo; Tibetan: ཁམས་གསུམ་ khams gsum; Mn: гурван орон, gurvan oron; 三界; Cn: sānjiè; Jp: sangai; Tw: Sam-kài; Vi: tam giới
trikaya The 3 "bodies" of Buddha: Dharma-kaya (Sanskrit: dharmakāya; 法身 Cn: fǎshēn; Jp: hosshin; Vi: pháp thân); Sambhoga-kaya (Sanskrit: saṃbhogakāya; 報身 Cn: bàoshēn; Jp: hōshin; Vi: báo thân); Nirmana-kaya (Sanskrit: nirmāṇakāya; 應身,化身,応身 Cn: yìngshēn; Jp: ōjin; Vi: ứng thân)	Sanskrit: trikāya	三身; Cn: sānshēn; Jp: sanjin; Vi: tam thân
Triṃśikā	Sanskrit: Triṃśikā	唯識三十論頌
Tripitaka The "Three Baskets"; canon containing the sacred texts for Buddhism (Pāli): Vinaya Pitaka (Pāli, Sanskrit: Vinaya-piṭaka; Tib: འདུལ་བའི་སྡེ་སྣོད་ `dul ba`i sde snod; Mn: винайн аймаг сав vinain aimag sav; 律藏, 律蔵 Cn: lǜzàng; Jp: Ritsuzō; Vi: Luật tạng); Sutra Pitaka (Pāli: Sutta-piṭaka; Sanskrit: Sūtra-piṭaka; Tib: མདོ་སྡེའི་སྡེ་སྣོད་ mdo sde`i sde snod; Mn: судрын аймаг сав sudriin aimag sav; 經藏, 経蔵 Cn: jīngzàng; Jp: Kyōzō; Vi: Kinh tạng); Abhidhamma Pitaka (Pāli: Abhidhamma-piṭaka; Sanskrit: Abhidharma-piṭaka; Tib: མངོན་པའི་སྡེ་སྣོད་ mngon pa`i sde snod; Mn: авидармын аймаг сав avidarmiin aimag sav; 論藏, 論蔵 Cn: lùnzàng; Jp: Ronzō; Vi: Luận tạng)	Pāli: tipiṭaka; Sanskrit: tripiṭaka	Burmese: တိပိဋက Tipitaka (IPA: [tḭpḭtəka̰]); Thai: ไตรปิฎก Traipidok; སྡེ་སྣོད་་གསུམ, sde snod gsum; Mn: гурван аймаг сав, gurvan aimag sav; 三藏, 三蔵; Cn: Sānzàng; Jp: Sanzō; Ko: Samjang; Vi: Tam tạng
Triratna/Tiratana, see Three Jewels above	Pāli: tiratana; Sanskrit: triratna	Tib: དཀོན་མཆོག་གསུམ, dkon mchog gsum; Mn: гурван эрдэнэ, gurvan erdene
triviṣa three poisons	Sanskrit: triviṣa	三毒
trsna, see tanha above		
tulku A re-incarnated Tibetan teacher	Tibetan: སྤྲུལ་སྐུ་ tulku	Mn: хувилгаан, khuvilgaan; 再來人 (轉世再來的藏系師長); Cn: Zài lái rén; Jp: keshin; Vi: hoá thân

== U ==
Definition	Etymology	In other languages
Udānavarga "Groups of Utterances"	Sanskrit: Udānavarga	出㬬經
upadana Clinging; the 9th link of Pratitya-Samutpada; the Ninth Twelve Nidanas	Pāli, Sanskrit: upādāna	Bur: ဥပါဒါန် upadan (IPA: [ṵpàdàɴ]); Khmer: ឧបទាន; UNGEGN: ŭbâtéan; ALA-LC: upadān; IPA: [ʔupatiən]; Shan: ဢူႉပႃႇတၢၼ်ႇ ([ʔu˥ paː˨ taːn˨]); Thai: อุปาทาน u-pa-taan; Tib: ལེན་པ, len pa; Mn: авахуй, avahui; 取(十二因緣第九支); Cn: qǔ; Jp: shu; Vi: thủ
Upajjhaya spiritual teacher	Pāli: Upajjhaya; Sanskrit: upādhyāy	Bur: ဥပဇ္ဇာယ်ဆရာ Upyizesaya (IPA: [ṵ pjɪʔzèsʰajà])
upasaka A lay follower of Buddhism	Sanskrit: upāsaka	Bur: ဥပါသကာ upathaka (IPA: [ṵpàθəkà]); Khmer: ឧបាសក; UNGEGN: ŭbasâk; ALA-LC: upāsak; IPA: [ʔuɓaːsɑk]; Mon: ဥပါသကာ ([ʊʔpasəka]); Thai: อุบาสก u-ba-sok; 近事男, 優婆塞; Cn: jìnshìnán; Jp: ubasoku; Vi: cư sĩ
upasika A female lay follower	from upasaka above; Sanskrit: upāsika	Bur: ဥပါသိကာ upathika (IPA: [ṵpàθḭkà]); Khmer: ឧបាសិកា; UNGEGN: ŭbasĕka; ALA-LC: upāsikā; IPA: [ʔuɓaːsekaː]; Thai: อุบาสิกา u-ba-sika; 近事女, 優婆夷; Cn: jìnshìnǚ; Jp: ubai; Vi: (nữ) cư sĩ
upaya Expedient though not necessarily ultimately true. Originally used as a polemical device against other schools - calling them "merely" expedient, lacking in ultimate truth, later used against one's own school to prevent students form forming attachments to doctrines In Mahayana, exemplified by the Lotus Sutra, upaya are the useful means that Buddhas (and Buddhist teachers) use to free beings into enlightenment	Sanskrit: upāya	Bur: ဥပါယ် upe (IPA: [ṵ pè]); Khmer: ឧបាយ; UNGEGN: ŭbay; ALA-LC: upāy; IPA: [ʔuɓaːj]; Tib: ཐབས, thabs; Mn: арга, arga; 方便; Cn: fāngbiàn; Jp: hōben; Vi: phương tiện
upekkha equanimity	Pāli: upekkhā; Sanskrit: upekṣā	Bur: ဥပက္ခာ upyikkha (IPA: [ṵpjɪʔkʰà]); Khmer: ឧបេក្ខា; UNGEGN: ŭbékkha; ALA-LC: upekkhā; IPA: [ʔupeːkkʰaː]; Thai: อุเบกขา u-bek-kha; Tib: བཏང་སྙོམས་, btang snyoms; Mn: тэгшид барихуй, tegshid barihui; 镇定，沉着, 捨; Cn: Zhèndìng, chénzhuó; Jp: sha
urna A concave circular dot on the forehead between the eyebrows	Sanskrit: urna	Mn: билгийн мэлмий, bilgiin melmii; 白毫; Jp: byakugō; Vi: bạch hào

== V ==
Definition	Etymology	In other languages
Vajrayana, The third major branch, alongside Hinayana and Mahayana, according to Tibetan Buddhism's view of itself	Sanskrit: vajrayāna, lit. "diamond vehicle"	Bur: ဝဇိရယာန wazeirayana (IPA: [wəzeiɹa̰ jàna̰]); Thai: วชิรญาณ wachira-yaan; Mn: Очирт хөлгөн, ochirt khölgön; 金剛乘; Cn: Jīngāng shèng; Jp: Kongō jō; Vi: Kim cương thừa
Vairocana	Sanskrit: वैरोचन	Tib: རྣམ་པར་སྣང་མཛད། rNam-par-snang mdzad; Mn: ᠪᠢᠷᠦᠵᠠᠨ᠎ ᠠ᠂ ᠮᠠᠰᠢᠳᠠ ᠭᠡᠢᠢᠭᠦᠯᠦᠨ ᠵᠣᠬᠢᠶᠠᠭᠴᠢ᠂ ᠭᠡᠭᠡᠭᠡᠨ ᠭᠡᠷᠡᠯᠲᠦ; Бярузана, Машид Гийгүүлэн Зохиогч, Гэгээн Гэрэлт; Biruzana, Masida Geyigülün Zohiyaghci, Gegegen Gereltü; 毗盧遮那佛, 大日如來; Cn: Pílúzhēnàfó; Jp: Dainichi Nyorai, Birushana-butsu; Vi: Đại Nhật Như Lai
Vāsanā habitual tendencies or dispositions	Pāli and Sanskrit: Vāsanā	Bur: ဝါသနာ wathana (IPA: [wàðanà]); Khmer: វាសនា; UNGEGN: véasânéa; ALA-LC: vāsanā; IPA: [ʋiəsnaː]; 習気; Jp: jikke
Vinaya Pitaka, The first basket of the Tripitaka canon, which deals with the rules of monastic life	Pāli, Sanskrit: vinaya-piṭaka, lit. "discipline basket"	Bur: ဝိနည်းပိဋကတ် wini pitakat (IPA: [wḭní pḭdəɡaʔ]); Khmer: វិន័យបិដក; UNGEGN: vĭnoăy bĕdâk; ALA-LC: vinăy piṭak; IPA: [ʋinəj ɓeɗɑk]; Mon: ဝိနဲ ([wìʔnòa]); Shan: ဝီႉၼႄး ([wi˥˩ ɛ˦]); Thai: วินัย wi-nai; Tib: འདུལ་བའི་སྡེ་སྣོད་ dul-bai sde-snod; Mn: Винайн аймаг сав, vinain aimag sav; 律藏; Cn: Lǜzàng; Jp: Ritsuzō; Vi: Luật tạng
vipassana Usually translated as "Insight" meditation, most associated with the Theravāda tradition, but also present in some other traditions such as Tiantai. Often combined with śamatha meditation	from vi-√dṛś: to see apart; Pāli: vipassanā; Sanskrit: vipaśyanā, vidarśanā	Bur: ဝိပဿနာ wipathana (IPA: [wḭpaʔθanà]); Khmer: វិបស្សនា; UNGEGN: vĭbâssânéa; ALA-LC: vipassanā; IPA: [ʋipahsanaː]; Shan: ဝီႉပၢတ်ႈသၼႃႇ ([wi˥ paːt˧ sʰa˩ naː˨]); Thai: วิปัสสนา wipadsana; Tib: ལྷག་མཐོངlhag mthong; Mn: үлэмж үзэл, ulemj uzel; 觀,観; Cn: guān; Jp: kan; Vi: quán
viriya energy, enthusiastic perseverance	from; Pāli: viriya; Sanskrit: vīrya,	Khmer: វីរិយ; UNGEGN: virĭy; ALA-LC: vīriy; IPA: [ʋiːrəj]; Tib: brtson-grus; Thai: วิริยะ wiriya; 能量; Cn: néngliàng; Jp: nōryō; Vi: năng-lượng

== Y ==
Definition	Etymology	In other languages
yāna divisions or schools of Buddhism according to their type of practice (lit. "vehicle")	Pāli: yāna; Sanskrit: yāna	Khmer: យាន; UNGEGN: yéan; ALA-LC: yān; IPA: [jiən]; 乘; Cn: shèng; Jp: jō; Vi: thừa

== Z ==
Definition	Etymology	In other languages
zazen Sitting meditation as practiced in the Zen School of Buddhism	Japanese: 坐禅	坐禪; Cn: zuòchán; Kr: jwaseon; Vi: toạ thiền
Zen School A branch of Mahayana originating in China that originally emphasizes non-dualism and intuition. Modern monastic forms have a strong emphasis on zazen (Korean) or on zazen combined with militaristic top-down hazing (Japanese)	Japanese: 禅宗 Zen-shu	禪宗; Cn: Chánzōng; Vi: Thiền tông
zendo In Zen, a hall where zazen is practiced	Japanese: 禅堂	禪堂; Cn: chántáng; Vi: thiền đường

== See also ==
- Buddhism
- Buddhist texts
- Glossary of Japanese Buddhism
- Diamond Realm
