= Sanzen =

Sanzen (参禅), a.k.a. nisshitsu (入室), means going to a Zen master for instruction. In the Rinzai school, it has the same meaning as dokusan, which is specifically a private interview between student and master, often centering on the student's grasp of an assigned koan. If the master rings a bell to dismiss the student, this means the student's understanding is not right and that their work with the koan must continue. It is typically held twice a day in a monastery, though during a week-long sesshin sanzen may take place as often as four times in one day.

== See also ==
- Jikido
- Jikijitsu
- Keisaku
