= St Hugh's Church, Foolow =

St Hugh’s Church, Foolow
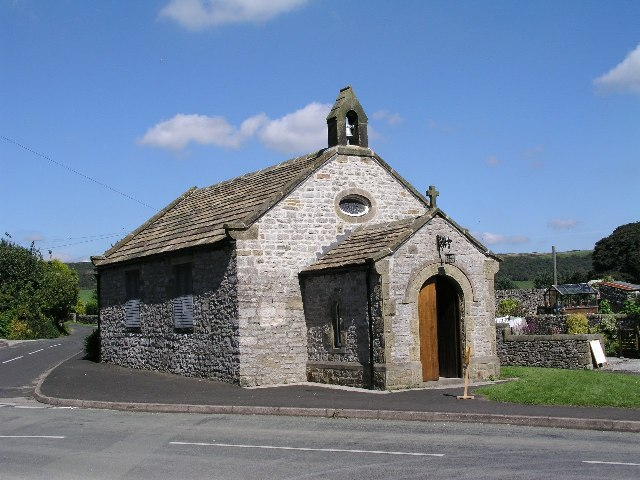
- St Hugh’s Church, Foolow
- St Hugh’s Church, Foolow
- 53°17′16.18″N 1°42′53.83″W
- Location: Foolow
- Country: England
- Denomination: Church of England

History
- Dedication: St Hugh

Architecture
- Heritage designation: Grade II listed
- Groundbreaking: 15 August 1888
- Completed: 17 November 1888

Administration
- Diocese: Diocese of Derby
- Archdeaconry: Chesterfield
- Deanery: Bakewell and Eyam
- Parish: Foolow

St Hugh's Church, Foolow is a Grade II listed parish church in the Church of England in Foolow, Derbyshire.

== History ==
The church was opened on 17 November 1888. The Chancel was added that 17 December, and the front vestibule was a later addition.

== Parish status ==
The church is in a joint parish with:

- St. Anne's Church, Baslow
- St Lawrence's Church, Eyam

== Organ ==
The church contains a pipe organ by the Positive Organ Company. A specification of the organ can be found on the National Pipe Organ Register.

== See also ==
- Listed buildings in Foolow
