= Jikijitsu =

A jikijitsu (直日) is the directing monk in charge of every movement of the Buddhist monks coming to sit zazen in the zendō (meditation hall) in a Buddhist monastery of the Rinzai school of Zen. Their position is that of abbot, and they are generally regarded as strict disciplinarians. Their position is considered the most desirable in the meditation hall. The jikijitsu also ensures that the monks get to sleep and wake up on time according to a strict protocol.

== History ==
Originally the name was given to the monk who was assigned to take care of the monastery's robes and bowls. The monks rotated this duty among themselves each day. Today a monk may be appointed to the position for the duration of a sesshin (possibly more than one consecutive day).

== Timekeeper ==
The jikijitsu is the timekeeper for sessions of zazen, walking meditation, and meals. Times during the daily schedule are signaled with woodblocks (han), gongs, umpans and handbells.

== Keisaku ==
During zazen, the jikijitsu will walk around the zendo wielding a keisaku, a stick used to strike a meditator's back when they have lost focus. These strikes are not violent and can relieve cramps for the individual being struck. They sound like a loud whack and can terrify newcomers, but they "are not particularly painful". In the Rinzai school, the jikijitsu may strike a student without a student's request if they feel the student has gone astray. In the Sōtō school, a student will ask for a blow by placing both palms together in gassho as the jikijitsu walks in front of them.

== See also ==
- Jikido
- Jisha
- Sanzen
