= St Anne's Church, Baslow =

St. Anne’s Church, Baslow
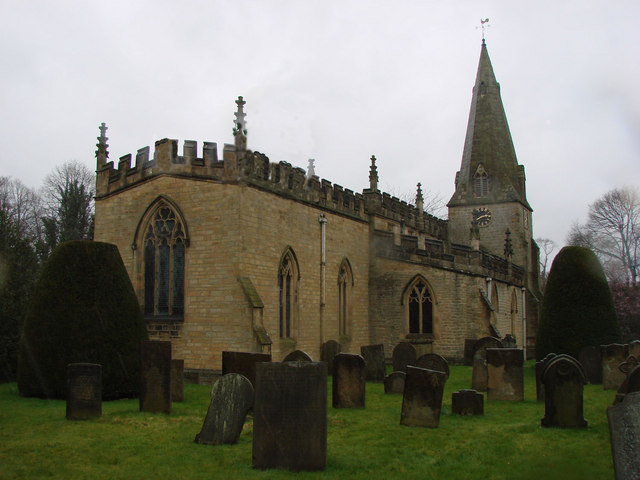
- St. Anne’s Church, Baslow
- St. Anne’s Church, Baslow
- 53°14′49.65″N 01°37′26.25″W
- Country: England
- Denomination: Church of England
- Churchmanship: Broad Church

Architecture
- Heritage designation: Grade II* listed

Administration
- Diocese: Diocese of Derby
- Archdeaconry: Chesterfield
- Deanery: Bakewell and Eyam
- Parish: Baslow

St. Anne’s Church, Baslow, is a Grade II* listed parish church in Baslow, England.

== History ==
The church dates from the thirteenth century. It was subject of a restoration in 1852. The architect was Sir Joseph Paxton, and the contractors were Watts of Ashover, Savage of Chesterfield and Green of Baslow. A new chancel was added. The plaster and gallery were removed. The organ was improved by Mr. Foster of Hull and transferred to the north-west side. A stained glass window was inserted in the new chancel. New pews in the gothic style were installed. A marble pulpit was added, and the chancel floor was paved with Minton encaustic tiles. A new vestry was formed at the west end and access to the belfry was made from the exterior of the tower. Central heating was installed by Renishaw. The church reopened on Thursday 30 December 1853.

The church was restored again in 1894 when the church was cleaned, and new stained glass by Hardman of Birmingham windows were installed. The choir stalls in the chancel were replaced with ones made of oak and a reredos was added. The chancel floor was replaced with mosaic tiles. The work was done under the supervision of the architect John D Webster of Sheffield, with Samuel Hibberd of Baslow as the contractor.

The chancel was rebuilt in 1911.

== Tower clock ==
On the east face is the gable line of the former nave roof and a circular clock face inscribed with the characters V I C T O R I A 1 8 9 7 and Roman numerals used on the north face. The clock was the gift of Dr. Edward Mason Wrench (1833-1912) in commemoration of Queen Victoria's Diamond Jubilee.

== Parish status ==
The church is in a joint parish with:

- St Lawrence's Church, Eyam
- St Hugh’s Church, Foolow

== Churchyard ==
The churchyard contains the war grave of an Army Chaplain of World War I.

== Curiosity ==
The church is known for still having a whip formerly used by the parish dog whipper.

== Organ ==
The pipe organ dates from 1849 when an instrument was installed by Davis. It contained nine stops, Dulciana, 2 Diapasons, Principal, Fifteenth, Hautboy, Sesquialtera, and Cornet and was opened by Mr. Trimnel, assistant at Chesterfield Parish Church on 23 September 1849. This was replaced in 1865 with a new instrument by Brindley & Foster and this was opened by George Henry Smith of Sheffield Parish Church on 5 December 1865. It was restored by Brindley and Foster in 1895 and there was later restoration work by Conacher and Co, and Chalmers and Hyde. Details of the organ can be found on the National Pipe Organ Register.

== Bells ==
The church tower contains 6 bells, the oldest dating from 1520 by Ralph I Heathcote.

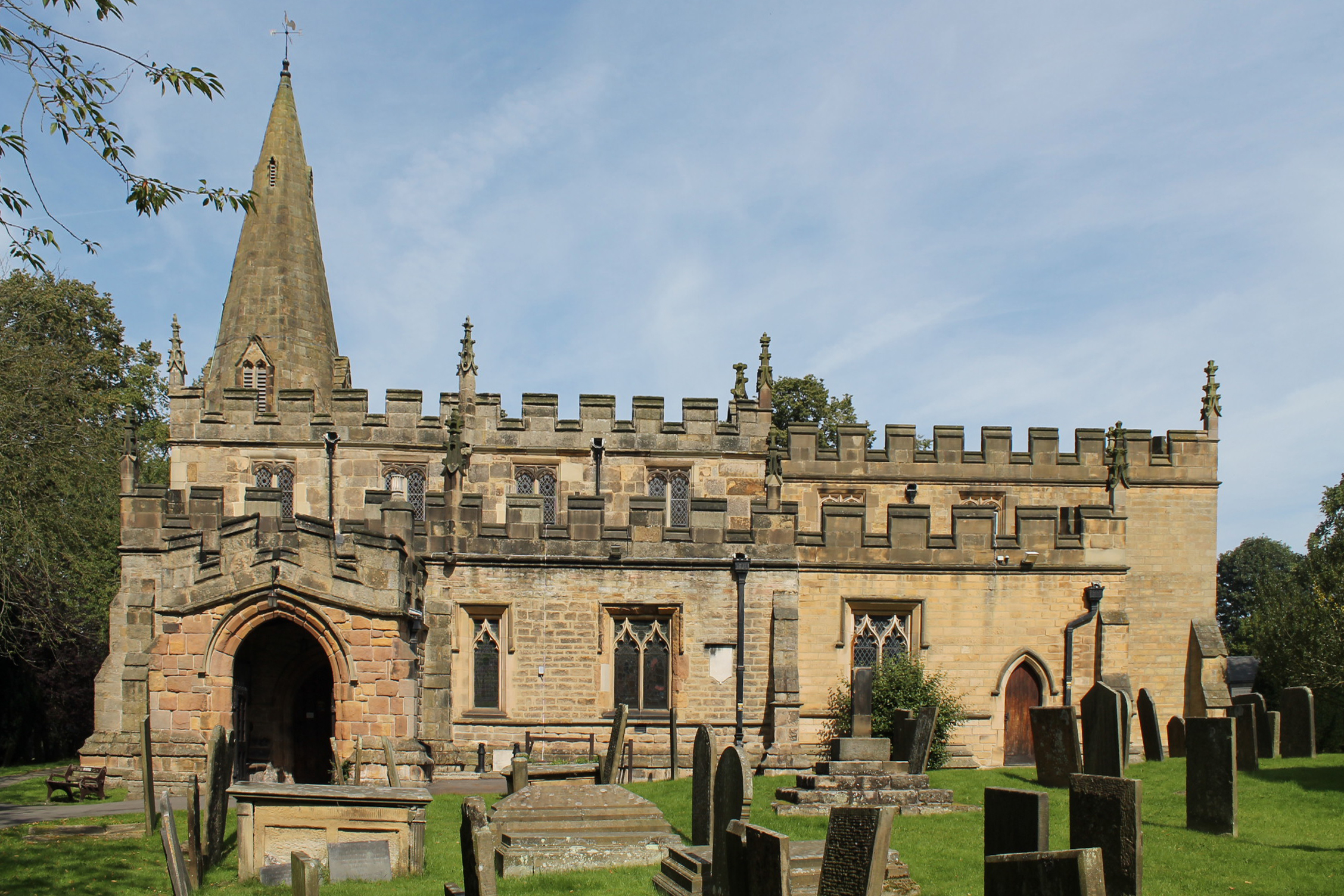
St Anne's church

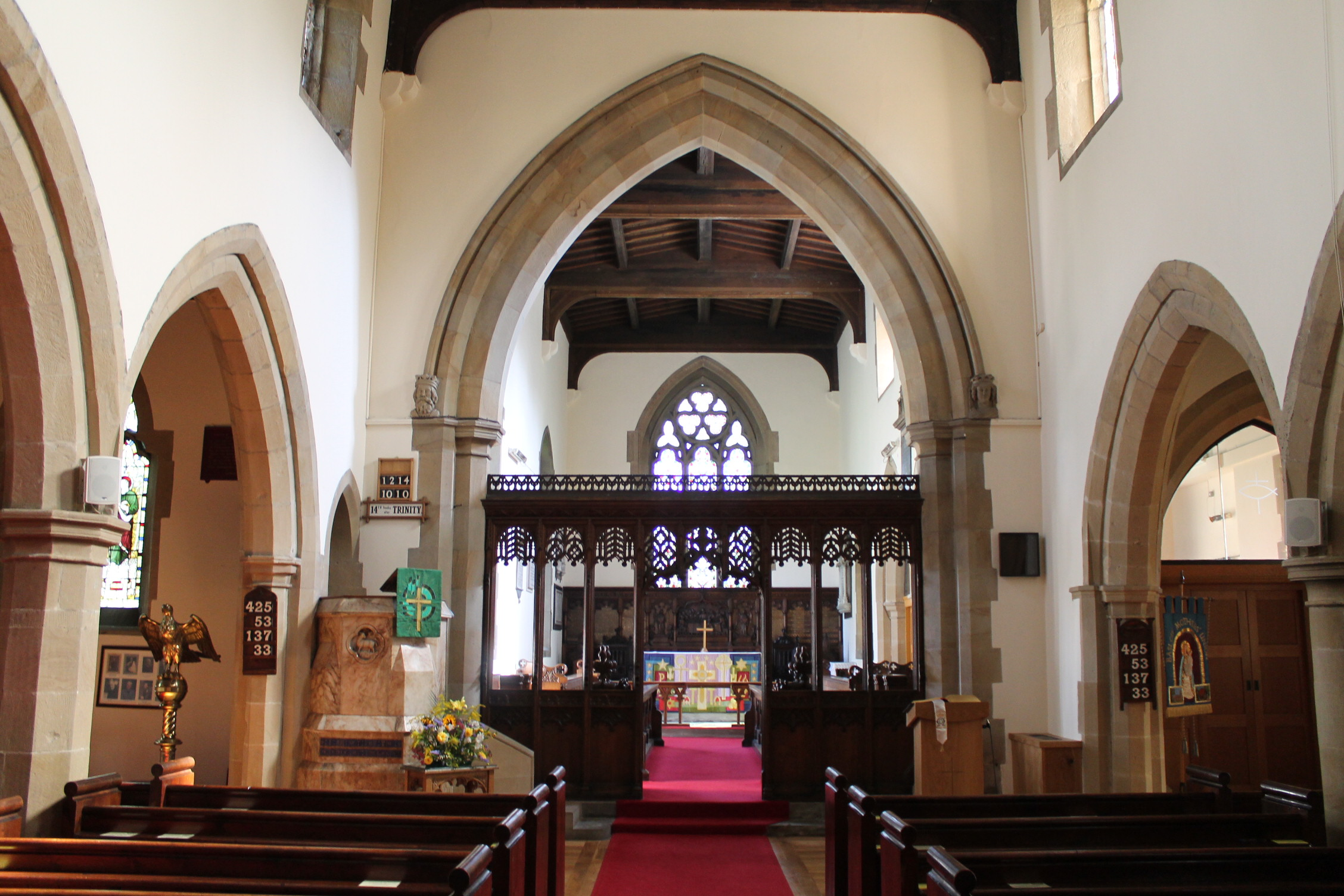
Interior

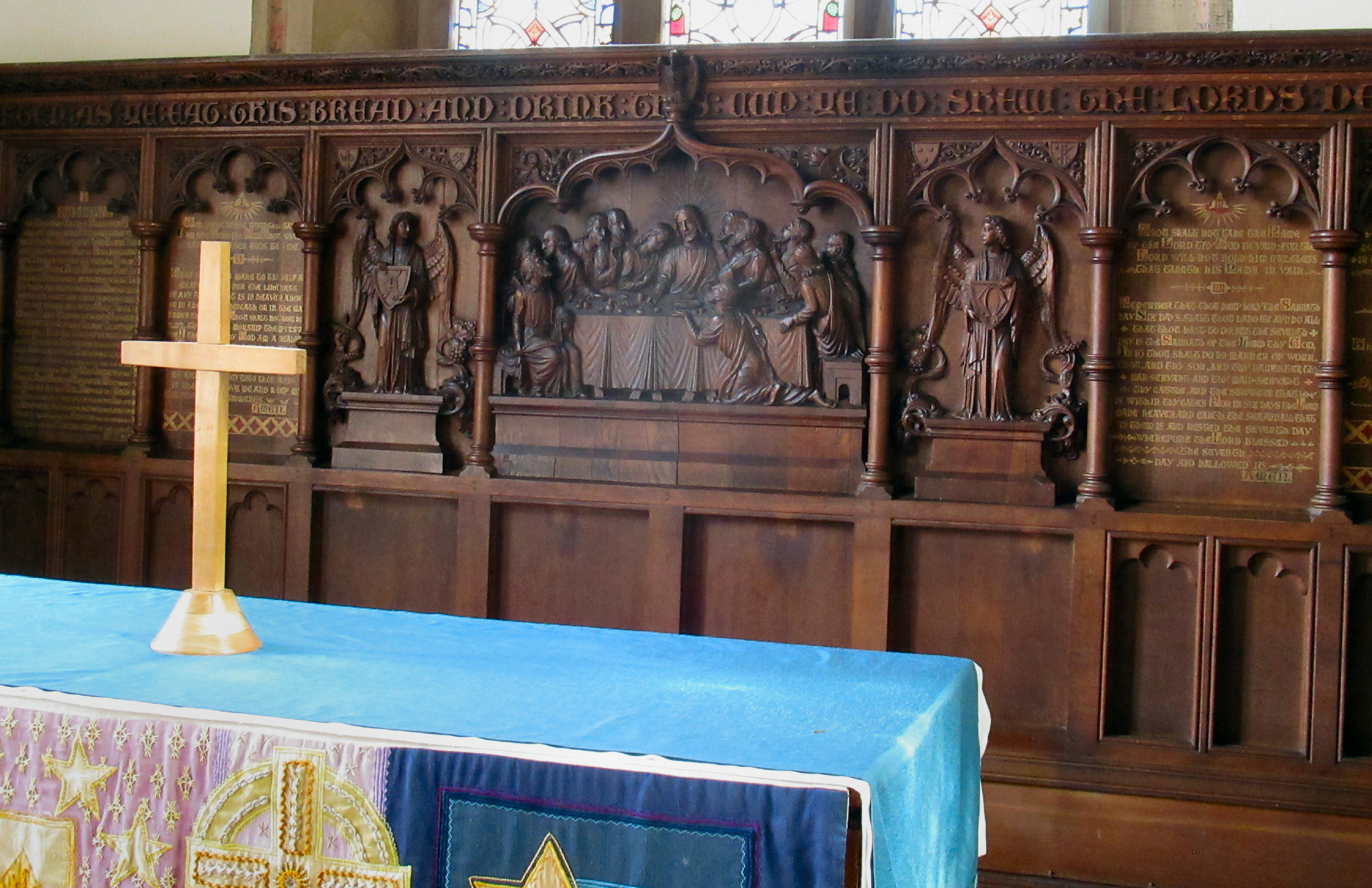
Reredos

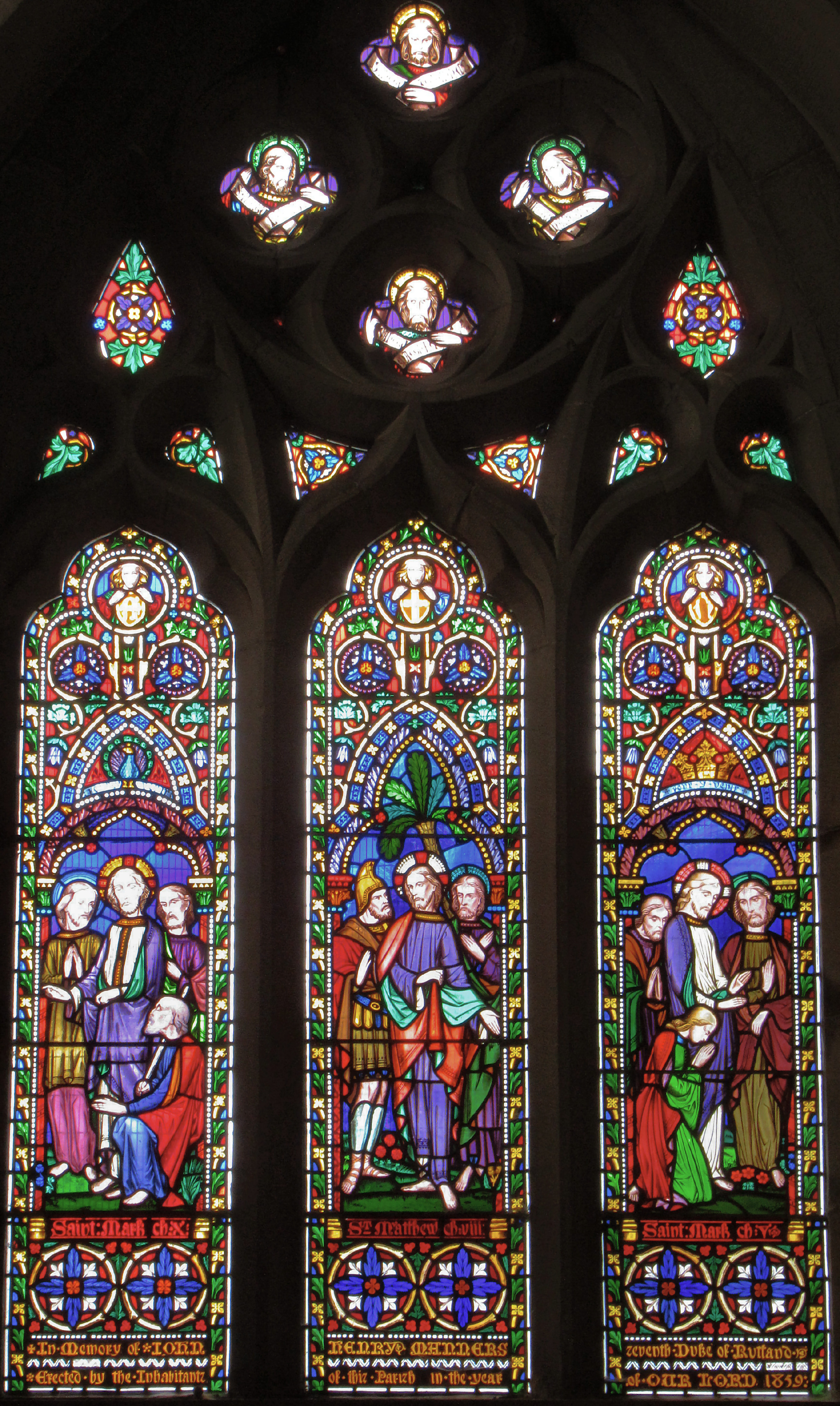
West window, possibly by William Wailes

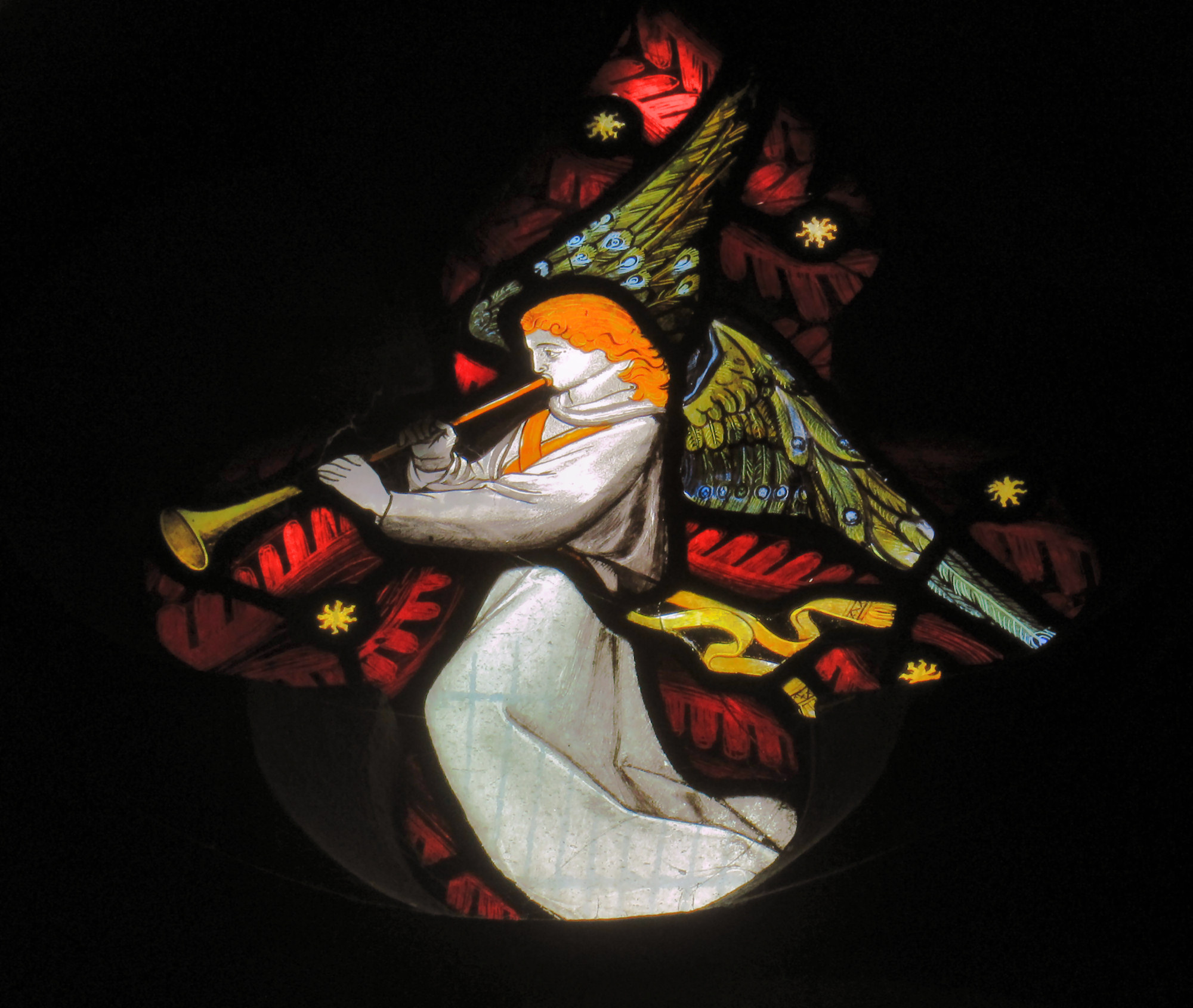
Angel on Isabel Wilson's memorial window
