= Jikido =

Activity in Zen Buddhism

In Zen Buddhism, it is the job of the jikidō (直堂) to run the zendo according to the rules prescribed by the teacher, and maintain the zendo's schedule.

The jikido makes a commitment to run every regularly scheduled sitting and each monthly sesshin. In Sōtō the jikido is the one person, other than the Teacher, who faces outward in the zendo instead of facing the wall. This is because the jikido`s practice cannot be simply private or inward, but must always face outward, aware and responsive to what's going on in the zendo. The jikido`s job is not just to facilitate the functioning of the zendo, the jikido embodies and exemplifies practice as functioning. And that is the functioning of no-self – of the forgotten self – that responds to each thing in turn, performs each function in turn without a thought of right or wrong or how am I doing or how do I look doing it.

== See also ==
- Jikijitsu
- Jisha
- Sanzen
