= Shippei =

A shippei (竹箆, 竹篦) is a bamboo staff which curves slightly, approximately 15 inches (Note: In Japanese measures it is given as 1 shaku 5 sun, or 15 sun, which is approximately 15 inches.) (or half a metre) long, which is used as a "symbol of a Zen master's authority" in Zen Buddhism. In contrast to the keisaku, the shippei was often used as a disciplinary measure for meditating monks. It can often be found at the side of a Zen master in a zendo and is also "one of seven items that make up a Zen monk's equipment." It is fashioned out of two pieces of bamboo that are shaped into the form of a spatula (or short bow), wound with rattan, and lacquered. (Note: Although some sources state it is bound with wisteria vine, sources in Japanese such as Iwanami dictionary state it is tō (籐; "rattan") and not fuji (藤; "wisteria") although these two characters are easily confounded.)

Sometimes curved in the shape of an S, the shippei may be elaborately decorated with a silk cord or have carvings. It is still "sometimes employed to hit monks".

== See also ==
- Keisaku
