= Sluggard waker =

Person waking members during a congregation

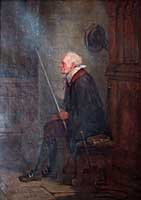
Painting of a 19th-century dog whipper and sluggard waker

A sluggard waker was an 18th-century job undertaken by a parishioner (usually the parish clerk), in British churches. The sole task of the sluggard waker was to watch the congregation during the services and tap anyone who appeared to be falling asleep sharply on the head. The actual tapping was not done by hand, nor was it done particularly gently or subtly. The sticks (or wands) used to do the tapping were usually long straight poles of stout local woods, and were sometimes tipped with either brass knobs, forks (both added and natural in the wood), or fox tails. In some regions of England there was a clear definition of which tips were for what purpose, sometimes to the extent of the stick having two ends. A brass tip or fork would usually be used for waking the men, while the fox tail was used for waking the female congregants.

== See also ==
- Keisaku – a similar tool used in Zen meditation
