= Listed buildings in Foolow =

Foolow is a civil parish in the Derbyshire Dales district of Derbyshire, England. The parish contains ten listed buildings that are recorded in the National Heritage List for England. All the listed buildings are designated at Grade II, the lowest of the three grades, which is applied to "buildings of national importance and special interest". The parish contains the village of Foolow and the surrounding countryside. Most of the listed buildings are houses, cottages and associated structures, and the others are a village cross, a church, a former mining building, and a telephone kiosk.

== Buildings ==
Name and location	Photograph	Date	Notes
Village Cross; 53.28787°N 1.71515°W		Mid 14th century	The oldest part of the cross is the head, with the shaft dating from 1868. It is in stone and has a stepped square plinth, a square base with a chamfered top and spurred corners, and a tapering shaft surmounted by an elaborate cross head. The cross head has short side arms with a rounded top, between the arms is a cusped circle with pierced spandrels, and on the west side is a central cross with raised Maltese crosses on each side.
The Old Hall; 53.28746°N 1.71501°W	—	Early 17th century	The house has been altered, extended and divided into two dwellings. It is in limestone, partly rendered, with gritstone dressings, quoins, roofs of slate, stone slate and tile, with moulded gable copings and kneelers. There are two storeys and attics, two bays, and extensions on both sides. Most of the windows are mullioned, some with hood moulds, and in the east extension is a porch.
Cottage and barn south of Rose Cottage; 53.28865°N 1.71498°W	—	Late 18th century	The cottage and barn are in limestone with gritstone dressings, and a stone slate roof. There are two storeys and two bays, with the single-bay barn on the right. The windows are mullioned, and in the barn is a hayloft door.
Kirk Lees; 53.28845°N 1.71585°W		Early 19th century	A house in rendered stone with gritstone dressings and quoins. There are two storeys and an L-shaped plan, consisting of a front range of three bays and a slate roof, and a rear wing with a roof of stone slate and tile. It contains a segmental-headed archway containing double doors, to the right is a doorway with a flush surround, and the windows are a mix of sashes and casements and a fixed window.
The Manor House; 53.28756°N 1.71577°W	—	Early 19th century	The house is in limestone with gritstone dressings, and a stone slate roof with coped gables and moulded kneelers. There are two storeys and attics, and fronts of two and three bays. The doorway has a chamfered surround and a wide bracketed hood, and the windows are sashes.
Stable block west of The Manor House; 53.28751°N 1.71643°W	—	Early 19th century	The stable block is in limestone with gritstone dressings, bracketed eaves, and a stone slate roof. There are two storeys and two bays. The building contains a doorway with a quoined surround, casement windows with large lintels, and thin vents.
Watergrove Cottages; 53.27892°N 1.71744°W	—	c. 1830	A pair of houses, later combined, in limestone with gritstone dressings, bracketed eaves gutters, and a hipped tile roof. There are two storeys and three bays. On each side is a porch, over which is a window with a pointed head containing Gothic tracery, and on the front are two-pane windows.
Outbuilding, Watergrove Mine; 53.27876°N 1.71905°W		c. 1830	The former mine building is in limestone with gritstone dressings, and a stone slate roof with coped gables and moulded kneelers. There are two storeys and two bays, and a lean-to on the east side. The building contains a wide central doorway and windows, all with large lintels, and at the rear is an external flight of steps.
St Hugh's Church; 53.28822°N 1.71525°W		1880	The church, which has been converted from a smithy, is in limestone with gritstone dressings, and a stone slate roof with coped gables and moulded kneelers. There is a single storey and two bays, and a shallow canted apse. At the south end is a projecting gabled porch with a cross finial, and a semicircular-arched entrance with a rusticated quoined surround. Above, in the gable wall, is an oval window, and on the gable apex is a bellcote.
Telephone kiosk 53.28768°N 1.71394°W		1935	The K6 type telephone kiosk was designed by Giles Gilbert Scott. Constructed in cast iron with a square plan and a dome, it has three unperforated crowns in the top panels.
