= Dog whipper =

Church official (16th-19th centuries)

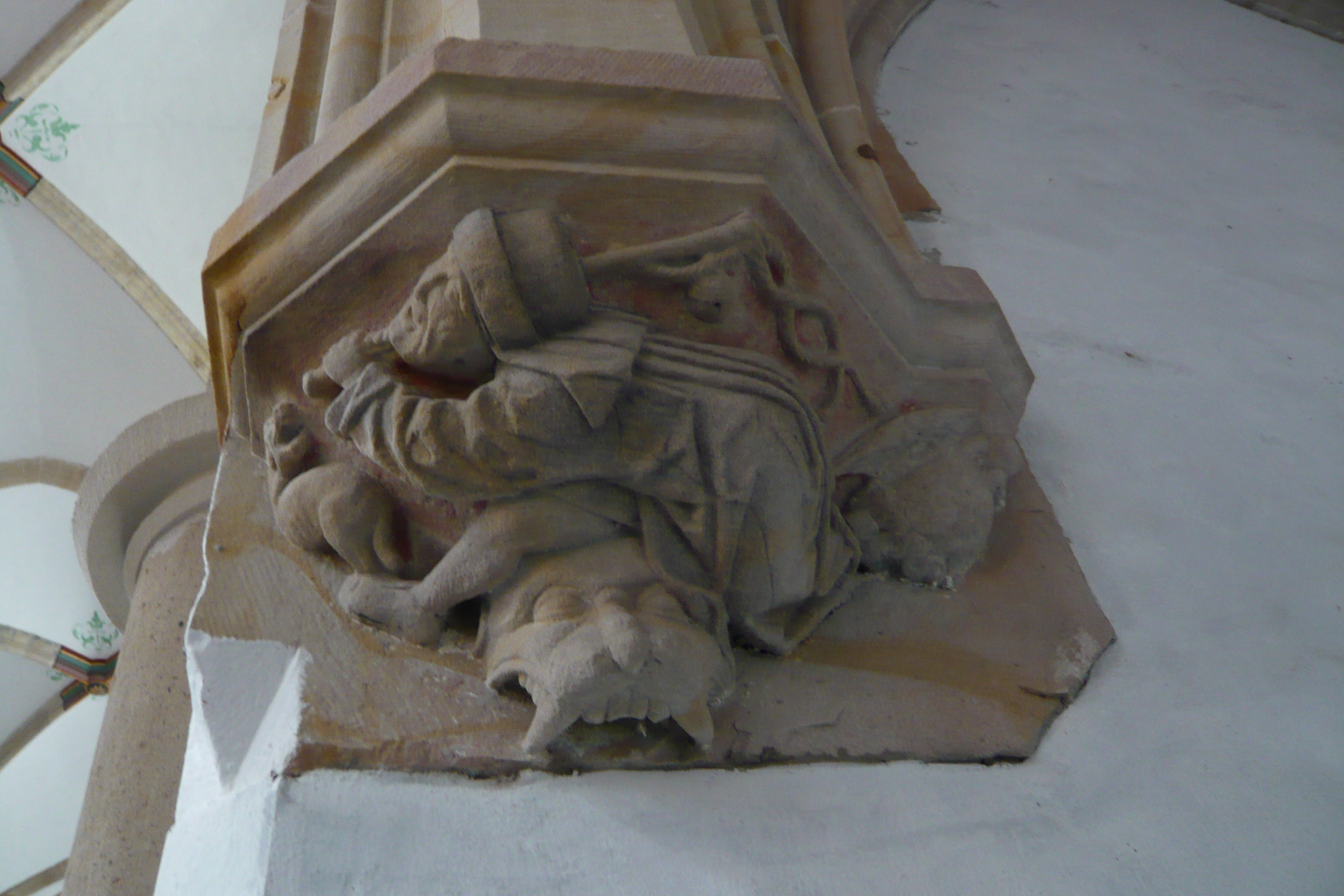
Carving of a dog whipper doing his job in a chapel of the Great Church of St. Bavo, Haarlem (Netherlands).

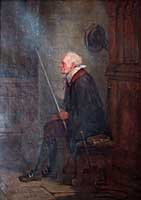
Painting of a 19th-century dog whipper and sluggard waker

A dog whipper was a church official charged with removing unruly dogs from church grounds during services. They were most prominent in areas of England and continental Europe between the 16th and 19th centuries.

Those employed for the position were given a three-foot-long whip and a pair of dog tongs with which to remove the animals. They were given the task of keeping stray animals away from the church and preventing communion bread and priests from being assaulted. The whip was utilized both for enforcement and as a deterrent while the tongs enabled the whipper to clasp a problematic animal from a safe distance.

It was not uncommon for household dogs to accompany—or at least follow—their owners to church services at this time. If at any point they became loud, fought with other animals, attacked congregation members, or were otherwise disruptive, it was the job of the dog whipper to remove them from the church as well as to allow the service to continue in peace.

Dog whippers were generally paid for their services, and records of payments to the local dog whipper exist in old parish account books in many English churches. In some areas a portion of village land was made available for the use of the dog whipper; the small park named 'Dog Acre' in Birchington-on-Sea is the remnant of such a grant.

Some villages employed dog whippers in a more general capacity, dealing with stray and disruptive dogs throughout the village. In this sense dog whippers were precursors of modern animal control officers, much like church 'bang beggars' were to today's police officer. In addition, churches that found their coffers lacking had the option of hiring out their services or giving their staff other tasks to complete. The role was similar to the 'Sluggard waker' that entailed poking or hitting drowsy members of the congregation on the head with a long, outfitted pole.

Dog whippers became less common from the late 18th century onwards, presumably because animals were increasingly unwelcome at church services. One of the last recorded dog whippers to perform the original function was one John Pickard, who was appointed to Exeter Cathedral in 1856. A small room in Exeter Cathedral is still known as the Dog Whipper's Room. Exeter still has a dog whipper, now a purely ceremonial role, for processions and other significant occasions.

A dog whipper's whip survives in St. Anne's Church, Baslow, Derbyshire, and a dog whipper's pew is preserved in St. Margaret's Church in Wrenbury, Cheshire. A notable carving of a dog whipper removing a dog with his whip can be seen in the Great Church of St. Bavo in Haarlem.

With the advent of animal shelters, this job became largely obsolete.
