= Jisha =

Japanese Zen term

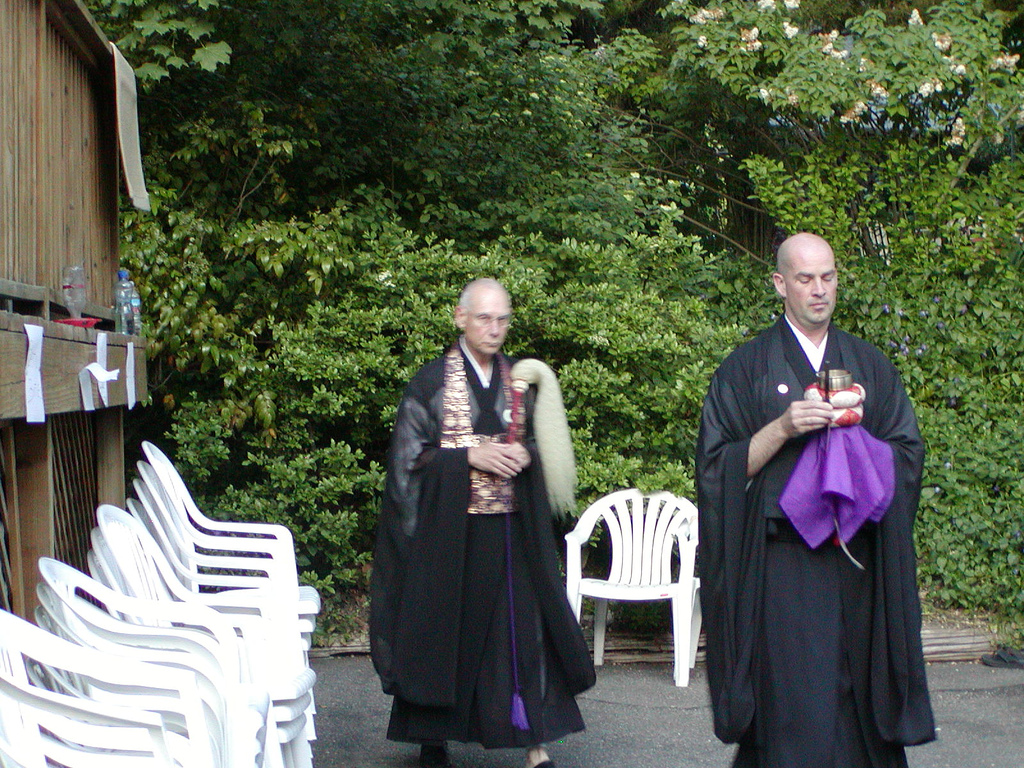
Dennis Genpo Merzel (left) with his jisha Simon Heale

Jisha (侍者), along with the titles inji and sannō, are Japanese terms used in reference to the personal attendant of a monastery's abbot or teacher in Zen Buddhism. In the Rinzai school, the term is usually either inji or sannō. According to the book 3 Bowls: Vegetarian Recipes from an American Zen Buddhist Monastery, "While the jikijitsu is the stern father of the zendo, the jisha is the den mother, balancing the strictness that his counterpoint establishes. The jisha prepares for and greets all guests, tends to the needs of the students, takes care of the sick, and organizes the cleaning of the monastery." According to author Victor Sōgen Hori, "In the Northern Sung period, a master of a large monastery had two attendants, but by the Yüan period the number of attendants had increased to five: an incense attendant, a secretary attendant, a guest attendant, a robe attendant, and a 'hot water and medicine' attendant who cooked for him."

== See also ==
- Jikido
- Jikijitsu
- Sensei
- Zen master
