= Foolow =

Village in Derbyshire, England

Coordinates: 53.2879°N 1.7151°W

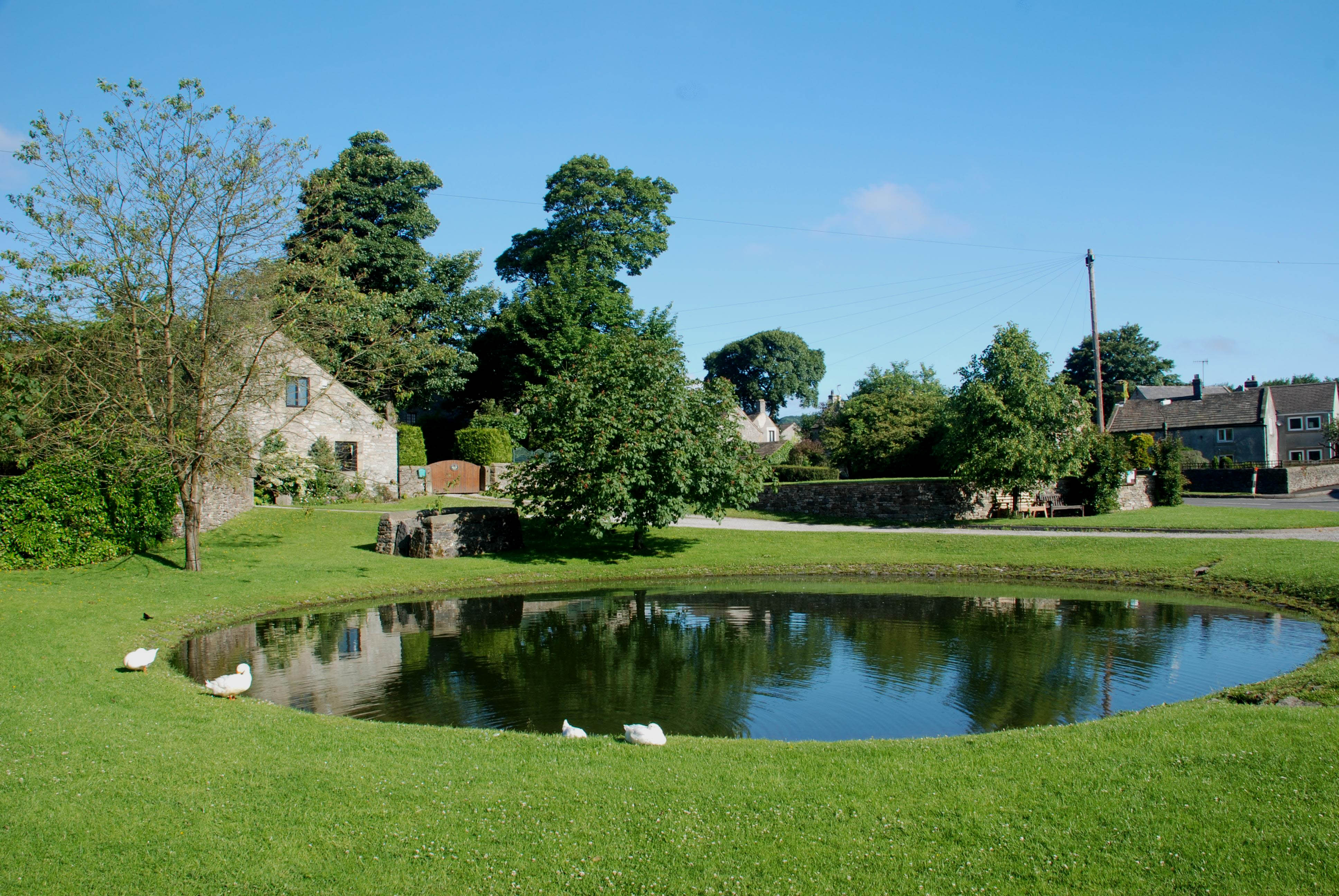
- The village pond

- Location within Derbyshire
- OS grid reference: SK191768
- District: Derbyshire Dales
- Shire county: Derbyshire
- Region: East Midlands
- Country: England
- Sovereign state: United Kingdom
- Post town: HOPE VALLEY
- Postcode district: S32
- Dialling code: 01433
- Police: Derbyshire
- Fire: Derbyshire
- Ambulance: East Midlands

Foolow (Old English possibly for "bird hill" or "colourful hill") is a village in the Derbyshire Peak District.

== Village centre ==
The village green contains an ornate Grade II listed medieval cross, similar to the one at Wheston but possibly of later date. It has been suggested that it is 15th century. It is inscribed with the date 1868, when it was moved from the site of the Wesleyan Reform Chapel and its shaft was replaced. A former bull ring lies in front of the cross.

== Lead mining ==
South of the village, the Watergrove Mine was active from the 18th century until 1853. Water was a problem over this period; both soughs and pumping engines were used. In 1837 a Fairbrother beam engine was installed. Its 80 ft (24 m) chimney stood until 1960. There are hillocks in the north of the parish that mark the sites of other mines. There are also sinkholes present- the most recent appeared in late 2013- believed to result from mine workings. It is probable that mining, whether for lead or other minerals, has been an occupation for the people of Foolow since at least the 15th century. Robert Roworth, of Folowe, a miner, appears as owing £4 to Thomas Calton of Chesterfield, in a legal record of 1470.

== See also ==
- Listed buildings in Foolow
