= Kammapatha =

Buddhist term for good and bad courses of action

Kammapatha, in Buddhism, refers to the ten wholesome and unwholesome courses (or paths) of action (karma).

Among the ten in the two sets, three are bodily, four are verbal, and three are mental. The ten courses of unwholesome kamma may be listed as follows, divided by way of their doors of expression:

Three of Body

1. Destroying life
2. Stealing
3. Sexual Misconduct

Four of Speech

4. False Speech
5. Divisive Speech
6. Offensive Speech
7. Senseless Speech

Three of Mind

8. Covetousness
9. Malice
10. Wrong view

The ten courses of wholesome kamma are the opposites of these: abstaining from the first seven courses of unwholesome kamma, being free from covetousness and malice, and holding right view. Though the seven cases of abstinence are exercised entirely by the mind and do not necessarily entail overt action, they are still designated wholesome bodily and verbal action because they center on the control of the faculties of body and speech.

Je Tsongkhapa mentions that, while the first seven (those of body and speech) are paths of action (karma-patha) and actions (karma), the three of the mind are karma-patha but they are not actions (karma) as they culminate in intentions. While intentions are actions, they are not karma-patha.

== See also ==
- Karma in Buddhism
