= Keisaku =

Buddhist ritual implement

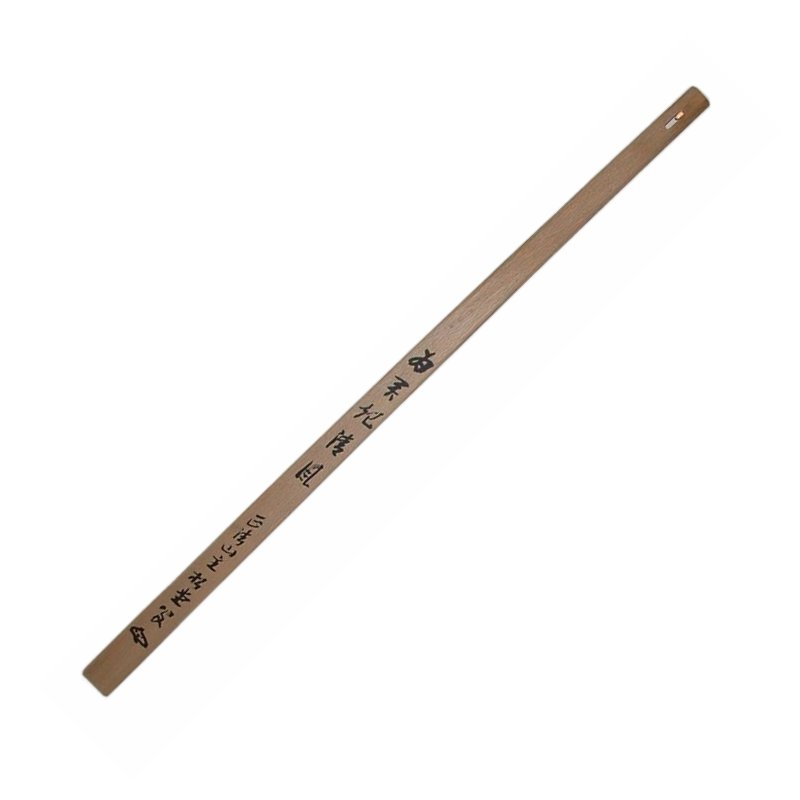
A Keisaku with calligraphy

In Zen Buddhism, the keisaku (Japanese: 警策, Chinese: 香板, xiāng bǎn; kyōsaku in the Soto school) is a flat wooden stick or slat used during periods of meditation to remedy sleepiness or lapses of concentration. This is accomplished through a strike or series of strikes, usually administered on the meditator's back and shoulders in the muscular area between the shoulder and the spine. The keisaku itself is thin and somewhat flexible; strikes with it, though they may cause momentary sting if performed vigorously, are not injurious.

== See also ==
- Jikijitsu
- Shippei
- Sluggard waker – a similar custom and tool used in 18th century British churches
