= Paul Haller =

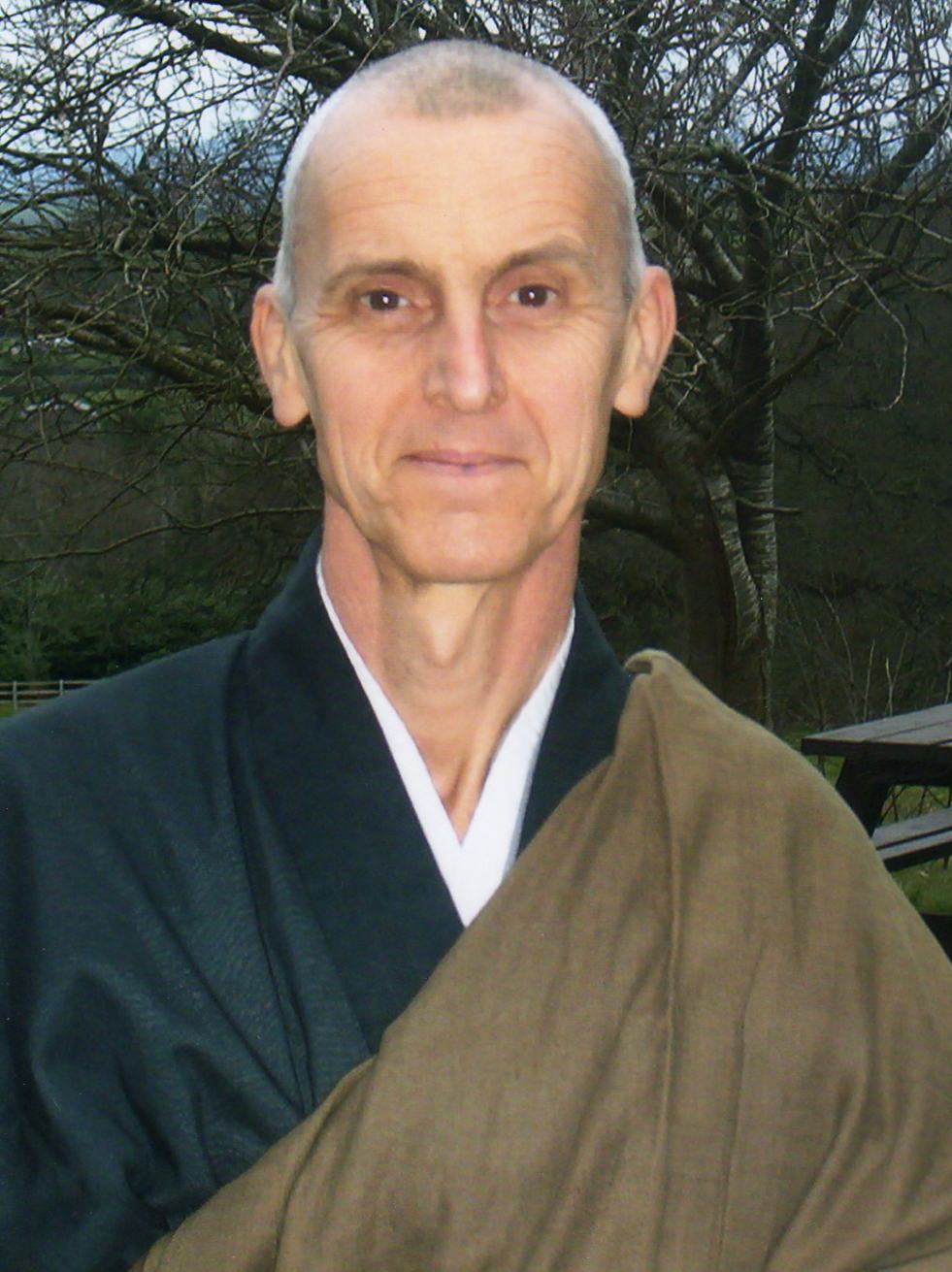
- Haller in 2006
- Title: Roshi

Personal life
- Born: Belfast, Northern Ireland
- Website: http://sfzc.org/

Religious life
- Religion: Buddhism
- School: Sōtō
- Dharma name: Ryushin Zendo

Senior posting
- Based in: San Francisco Zen Center

Ryushin Paul Haller, a Soto Zen roshi, is a former abbot of the San Francisco Zen Center—a position he held from 2003 until February 2012. Leaving his homeland of Belfast in Northern Ireland in the early 1970s, Haller spent time in Russia, Afghanistan and Japan. He then went to Thailand for two years where he was ordained as a Buddhist monk. Coming to California in 1974, he entered Tassajara Zen Mountain Center and was later ordained as a priest by Zentatsu Richard Baker in 1980. He received shiho from Sojun Mel Weitsman in 1993, giving him authority to teach. Since 2000 Haller has also been the teacher of Black Mountain Zen Centre in Belfast, Northern Ireland.

== See also ==
- Buddhism in the United States
- San Francisco Zen Center
- Green Gulch Farm
- Tassajara Zen Mountain Center
- Timeline of Zen Buddhism in the United States
