= Kannon Do Zen Meditation Center =

Religion
- Affiliation: Sōtō

Location
- Location: 1972 Rock Street, Mountain View, CA 94043
- Country: United States

Architecture
- Founder: Shunryu Suzuki
- Completed: 1964

Website
- www.kannondo.org

Kannon Do Zen Meditation Center provides Sōtō Zen practice in the San Francisco Peninsula and the South Bay. Named after Kannon, the Buddhist personification of compassion, the center provides a supportive environment in which Americans can experience traditional Zen teaching.

== History ==
Zen Master Shunryu Suzuki arrived in San Francisco from Japan in 1959 to be resident priest of Sokoji, the Japanese-American Soto Zen Mission in San Francisco. In 1961, he and his new American Zen students founded the San Francisco Zen Center. (The early history of Zen Center and Suzuki's life in the U.S. are well documented in his 1999 biography Crooked Cucumber by David Chadwick.)

In November, 1964, a "sitting group" was set up in Palo Alto, with the first morning zazen and lecture held at 1005 Bryant Street in Palo Alto. An evening group was later established in Redwood City. In 1965, the morning group moved to Marian Derby's home in Los Altos, joined by the evening group a year later. Meditation was followed by a brief lecture and an informal breakfast, with family-like discussions with Suzuki at the breakfast table. In a tradition that continues at Kannon Do, tea and cookies were served following the weekly lecture.

In 1965, Derby tape-recorded and transcribed Suzuki's morning lectures. From 1968, Trudy Dixon edited the lectures into a book, Zen Mind, Beginner's Mind, published in 1971.

In 1966, the garage was converted to a meditation hall in the style of Sōtō Zen temples in Japan, to Suzuki's design. Construction, by Sangha members, began in June, 1966. Haiku Zendo, named for its seventeen cushions that matched the number of syllables in a haiku poem, was officially opened on August 4, 1966.

In 1970, Kobun Chino-sensei became Haiku Zendo's resident teacher.

In 1979, the Sangha bought a small former Pentecostal church on College Avenue in Mountain View for $40,000. The new zendo was named Kannon Do, "place of compassion". In 1983, Kobun appointed Les Kaye the spiritual leader of Kannon Do.

After years of preparation, the present Kannon Do was dedicated on March 3, 2007, on a one-half acre property acquired for $800,000, at 1972 Rock Street in Mountain View. It serves the surrounding Santa Clara Valley communities.

== Branch centers and centers of similar tradition ==
Kannon Do branch centers include

- Zen Heart Sangha in Menlo Park / Woodside, Misha Shungen Merrill, Dharma heir of Les Kaye Roshi
- Ashland Zen Center in Ashland, Oregon, Harold Little and Patty Krahl ordained by Les Kaye Roshi
- Casco Zen Center in Casco, Maine
- Middle Way Zen in San Jose, Cornelia Junfu Shonkwiler, Dharma heir of Les Kaye Roshi
- Zen-Boulay.org in Paris, France

Kannon Do shares this tradition of practice established by Shunryu Suzuki with

- San Francisco Zen Center
- Tassajara Zen Mountain Center
- Berkeley Zen Center
- Sonoma Zen Mountain Center
- Green Gulch Farm Zen Center

== Abbot ==
Les Kaye is the current abbot of Kannon Do. He was ordained as a Zen monk by Shunryu Suzuki in 1971. Kaye was appointed spiritual leader of Kannon Do in 1982. In 1986, Kaye was recognized as a Zen teacher and a successor in the lineage of Shunryu Suzuki. Kaye worked for IBM in San Jose for over 30 years. He teaches the Meditation at Work program to organizations in Silicon Valley.

Kaye's book Zen at Work tells how his own meditation practice enhanced his life and work at IBM.

In his workbook Oryoki Manual, Kaye explains the traditional way of serving and eating meals in Soto Zen Monasteries.
