= Jiko Linda Cutts =

Eijun Linda Cutts
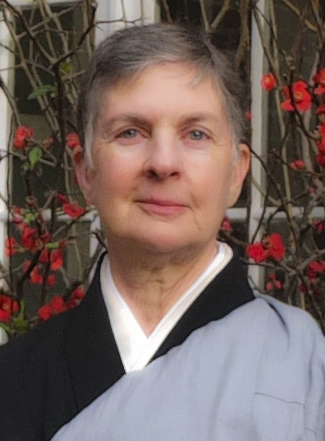
- Title: Priest

Personal life
- Born: 1947 (age 78–79) Minneapolis, Minnesota, United States
- Spouse: Steve Weintraub
- Children: Sarah Nancy Cutts Weintraub; 2 others

Religious life
- Religion: Zen Buddhism
- School: Sōtō
- Lineage: Shunryu Suzuki

Senior posting
- Based in: Green Gulch Farm; San Francisco Zen Center
- Predecessor: Tenshin Reb Anderson
- Successor: Jisan Tova Green, Keimyō Dario Girolami, Kyoshin Wendy Lewis

Eijun Linda Cutts (born 1947) is a Sōtō Zen priest practicing in the lineage of Shunryu Suzuki, a Senior Dharma Teacher at the San Francisco Zen Center. Cutts is a Dharma heir of Tenshin Reb Anderson, having received Dharma transmission from him in 1996. She served as co-abbess of the San Francisco Zen Center from 2000 to 2007, and had first begun practice at the San Francisco Zen Center in 1971; later, she was ordained a priest by Zentatsu Richard Baker in 1975. Currently living at Green Gulch Farm Zen Center, as abbess she had been aware of the significance in being a woman in a leadership position in religion that has historically been a patriarchy. In this vein, within her first year as abbess she instituted the ceremony in which female ancestors could be honored. She became Central Abbess of San Francisco Zen Center in 2014.

== See also ==
- Buddhism in the United States
- Timeline of Zen Buddhism in the United States
