= San Francisco Zen Center =

Network of affiliated Sōtō Zen practice centers

San Francisco Zen Center - City Center
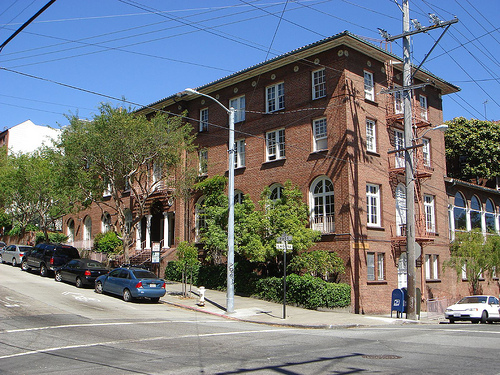

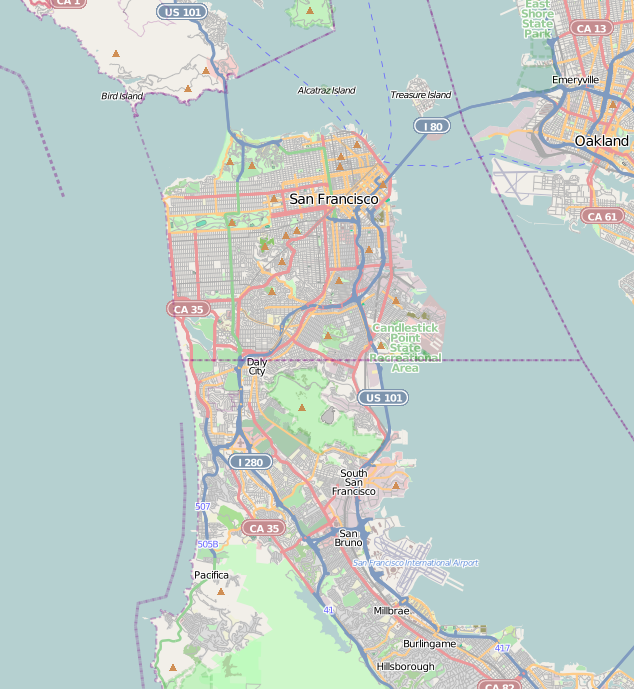
- Location within San Francisco Location within California Location within the United States

Religion
- Affiliation: Sōtō

Location
- Location: 300 Page St., San Francisco, CA 94102
- Country: United States
- Coordinates: 37.774009°N 122.426075°W

Architecture
- Architect: Julia Morgan
- Founder: Shunryu Suzuki
- Completed: 1922

Website
- www.sfzc.org

San Francisco Zen Center (SFZC), is a network of affiliated Sōtō Zen practice and retreat centers in the San Francisco Bay area, comprising City Center or Beginner's Mind Temple, Tassajara Zen Mountain Center, and Green Gulch Farm Zen Center. The sangha was incorporated by Shunryu Suzuki Roshi and a group of his American students in 1962. Today SFZC is the largest Soto organization with a foothold in the West.

== History ==
=== Founding and growth ===
On May 23, 1959, Shunryu Suzuki (then age 55) came from Japan to San Francisco to serve as head priest of Sokoji—a Soto Zen temple then located at 1881 Bush Street in Japantown. He was joined by his wife Mitsu (also from Japan) in 1961. Sokoji—founded by Hosen Isobe in 1934—had been housed in a former Jewish synagogue that is now Kokoro Assisted Living. Upon Suzuki's arrival at Sokoji, the congregation was composed entirely of members of the Japanese-American population. Unlike many of his predecessors, Suzuki was a fluent speaker of English.

Suzuki's arrival came at the tail end of the Beat movement and just prior to the social movements of the 1960s, both of which had major roots in San Francisco. Before long, Sokoji had non-Japanese Americans—mostly beatniks—coming to the temple to sit zazen with him in the morning. Soon these Westerners participated in regular services, and new non-Asian students came to outnumber the Japanese-American congregation. This change in demography caused a rift in the Sokoji community. The tension was alleviated when Suzuki's Western students began gathering for separate services, albeit still at Sokoji, in 1961. Some of these students began calling their group City Center, and they incorporated in 1962 as the San Francisco Zen Center.

The number of practitioners at SFZC grew rapidly in the mid-sixties. Within a couple of years, Suzuki considered founding a monastery to host more intensive practice for those students who were interested. In 1966, Suzuki and Richard Baker scouted Tassajara Hot Springs, located in Los Padres National Forest behind Big Sur, as a possible location for the envisioned monastic center. After a major fundraising effort led by Baker, Zen Center purchased the land—which contained a rundown resort and mineral springs—in 1967. Tassajara Zen Mountain Center ("Zen Mind Temple" or Zenshinji) was the first Zen Buddhist monastery built in the United States, and the first in the world to allow co-ed practice.

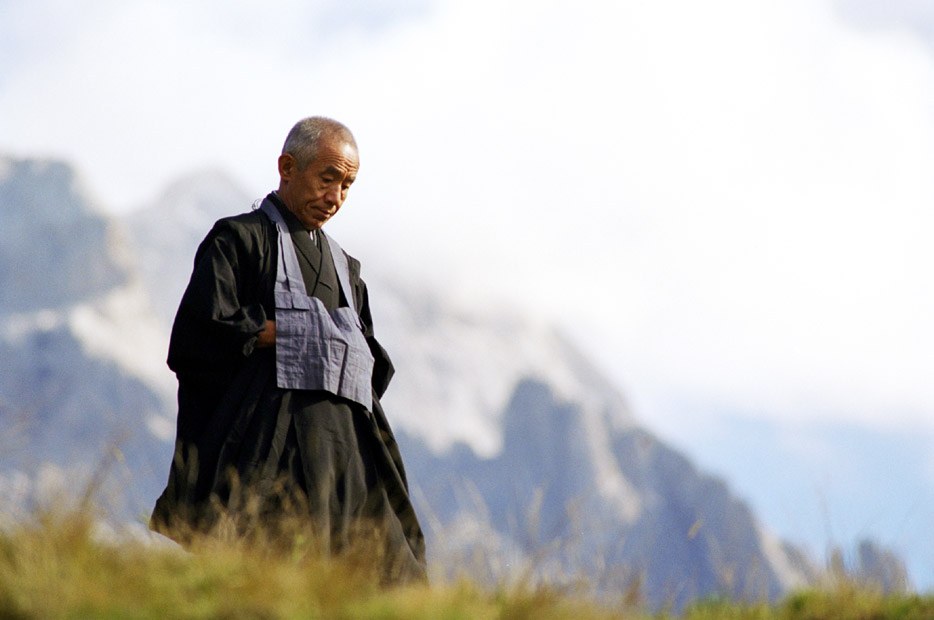
Kobun Chino Otogawa

The year 1967 also saw the arrival of Kobun Chino Otogawa of Eiheiji, who served as assistant to Suzuki. Kobun was resident teacher at the Tassajara Zen Mountain Center until 1970. Around 1970, he began sitting regularly with a group in Santa Cruz that went on to form the Santa Cruz Zen Center. In 1971, he became resident priest at Haiku Zen Center, a practice center in Los Altos where Suzuki-roshi had been giving lectures, and soon after the sangha there grew and changed its name to Bodhi. He served as Abbot there until 1978, moving the group to Jikoji in Los Gatos, California in 1979.

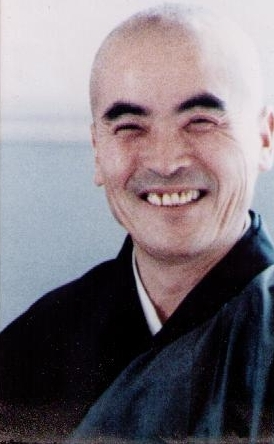
Dainin Katagiri

Another assistant priest at SFZC was Dainin Katagiri-roshi, who served there from 1969 to 1971. Katagiri would go on to establish his own practice center—the Minnesota Zen Center—in 1972 in Minneapolis.

In 1969, Sokoji's board of directors asked Suzuki to resign his position as the temple's priest, asserting that he was spending more time with his Western students than the Japanese-American congregation. Months later Suzuki—with the help of his American students—purchased the current (and larger) City Center building, located on 300 Page Street. The building, designed by Julia Morgan, was built as the Emanu-el Residence Club in 1922 for the Emanu-el Sisterhood. The residence combined residential rooms that could house 70 Jewish women on the upper floors, with public spaces for spiritual, recreational, and educational uses on the ground floor and basement. This relationship between the public and private was easily translated to the needs of the San Francisco Zen Center, with meditation halls and public spaces on the lower levels, and residential areas for practicing students on the upper floors.

=== Transition to Richard Baker's leadership ===
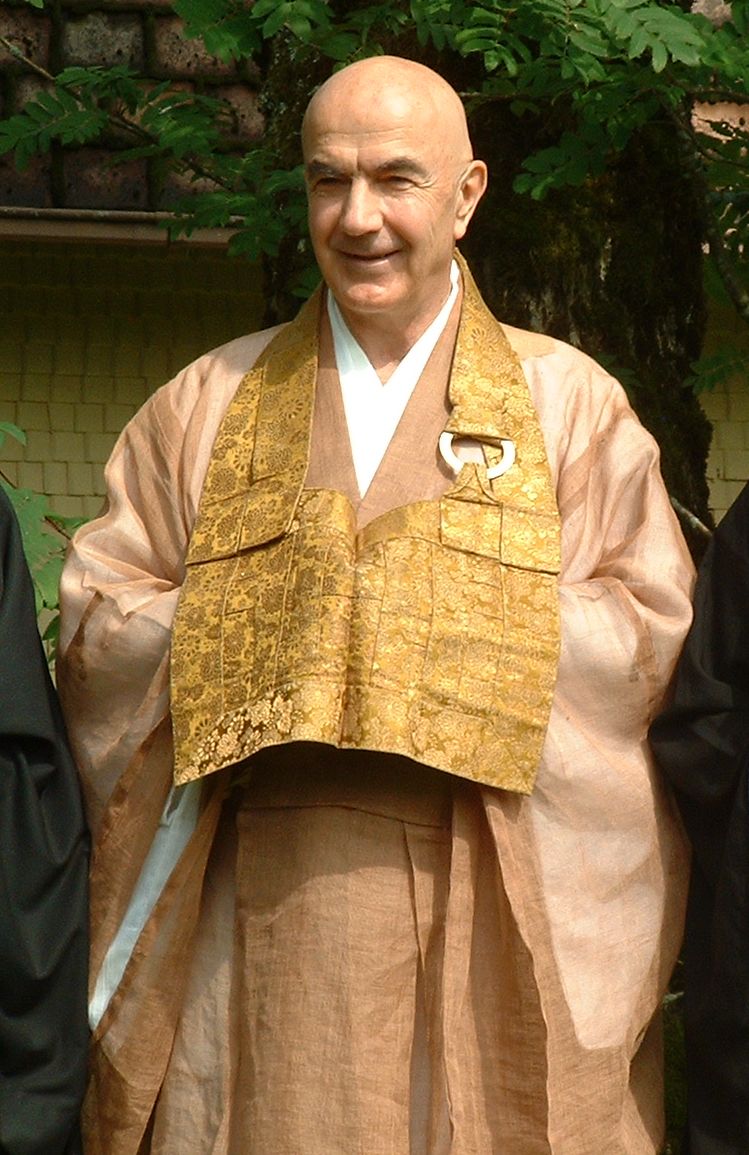
Zentatsu Richard Baker

In 1970, Suzuki gave Dharma transmission to Richard Baker, his only American Dharma heir and chosen successor at SFZC. Suzuki planned to give transmission to Bill Kwong but died before his completion. Kwong's transmission was later completed by Suzuki's son, Hoitsu.

Suzuki died of cancer on December 4, 1971 at 67 years of age. Despite having only had 12 years in the United States, Suzuki had gone a long way toward establishing Soto Zen in America. His death came shortly after the publication of Zen Mind, Beginner's Mind, a collection of lectures translated into numerous languages and considered a classic of contemporary Zen literature.

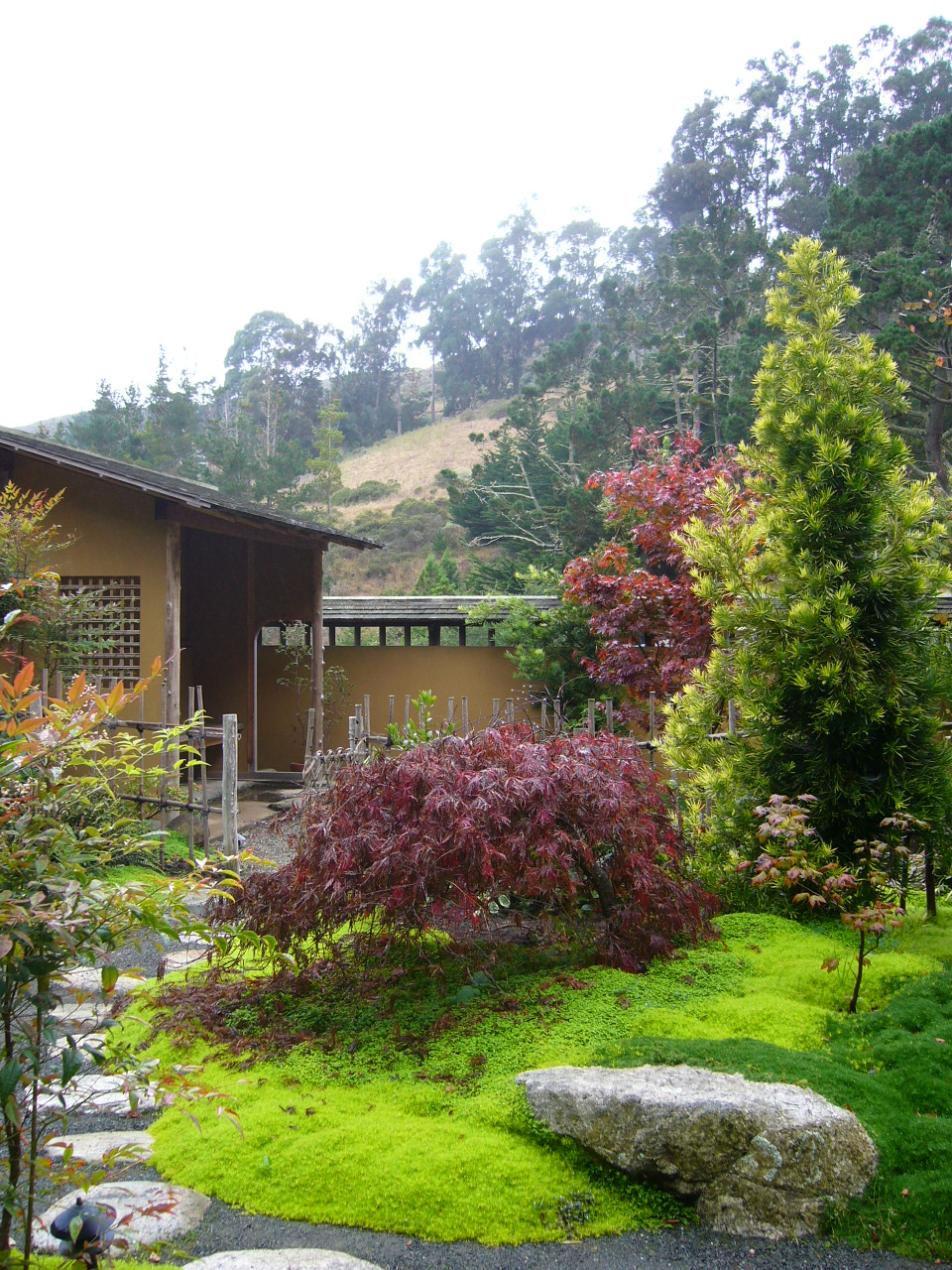
Green Gulch tea garden

Suzuki had asked Baker to locate a farm in the area for entire families to live a Buddhist life while working together. Green Gulch Farm ("Green Dragon Temple", or Soryuji), located in Sausalito, California in a valley on the Pacific Ocean, was acquired by SFZC in 1972. The land was purchased from one of the founders of Polaroid, George Wheelwright. Despite hesitance of some members of SFZC due to the size of 80 acres (320,000 m^{2}), Baker felt that acquiring Green Gulch Farm was very important for Buddhism in America. Members soon raised funds for a zendo to be built there, and over time the farm transformed into a monastery and retreat center for residents and guests with an organic farm, flower gardens, a teahouse and a plant nursery.

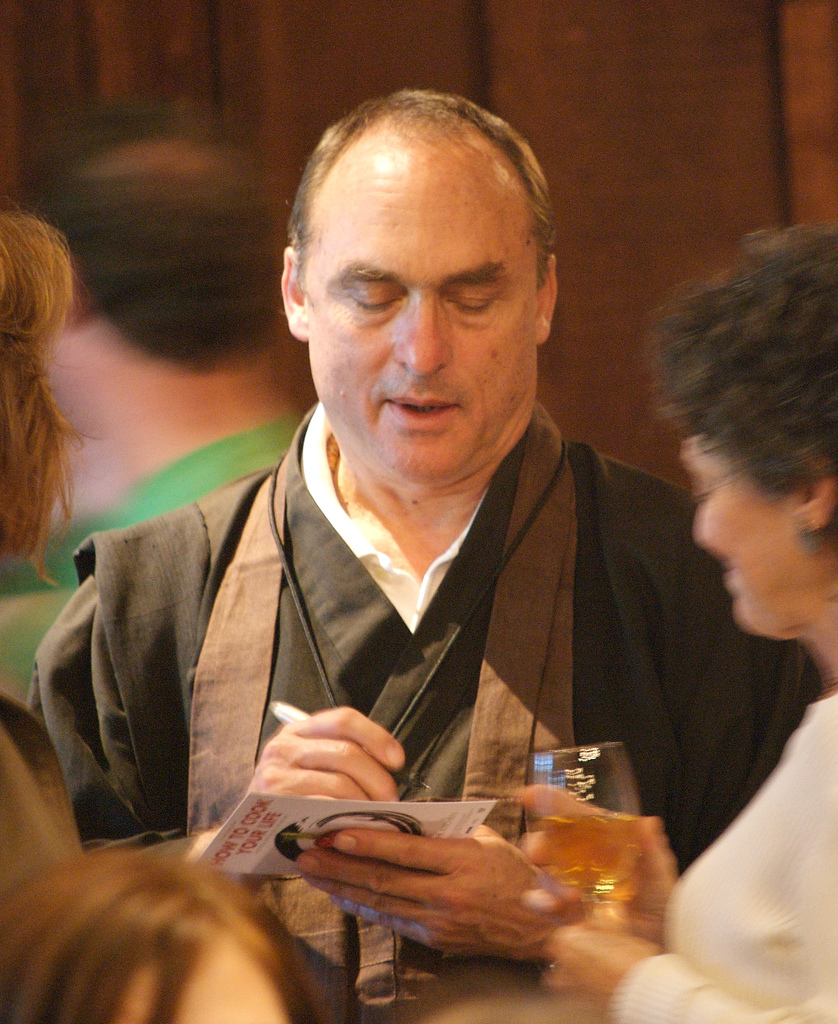
Edward Espe Brown

In 1976, SFZC purchased the Gallo Pastry Company to found the Tassajara Bakery, which became popular before being sold to the company Just Desserts in 1992. The bakery was closed altogether in 1999. Tassajara Bakery was a Zen Center venture promoted by Richard Baker as an extension of the baking practices at Tassajara Zen Mountain Center. Tassajara baked bread for student and guest consumption from 1967 onward, and Edward Espe Brown's Tassajara Bread Book demonstrated consumer interest. The bakery supplied Greens Restaurant and some local grocers.

Greens Restaurant, opened in 1979 in Fort Mason of San Francisco, was another business venture by SFZC under the influence of Baker. A pioneer of gourmet vegetarian cuisine in America, the restaurant's first chefs were Edward Espe Brown and Deborah Madison. The duo published a book of recipes in 1987 titled The Greens Cookbook. Throughout the 1980s Greens, which obtained produce from Green Gulch Farm, was one of the most popular restaurants in San Francisco.

Additional businesses run by SFZC were the Alaya Stitchery storefront, which made zafus, zabutons and clothing, and Green Gulch Grocery, which sold produce from Green Gulch Farm. Neither business is operative today.

=== Baker's resignation ===
In March 1983 Baker was accused of engaging in a sexual relationship with the wife of an influential sangha member. Although Baker claimed that his relationship was a love-affair which had not yet been consummated, the outcry surrounding the incident led to accusations of impropriety, including the admissions by several female members of the community that they had had affairs with Baker before or during his tenure as abbot. The community's sense of crisis sharpened when the woman's husband, one of SFZC's primary benefactors, threatened to hold the organization legally responsible for its abbot's apparent misconduct. These revelations led Baker to resign as abbot in 1984, resulting in significant media attention. In the wake of Baker's resignation, SFZC transitioned to a democratically elected leadership model, until in 2010 there was a new introduction of a predesignated slate of board members.

Following Baker's resignation, Dainin Katagiri led the community until 1985. When Katagiri left, Tenshin Reb Anderson assumed Abbotship of the Zen Center—serving until 1995. In the early 1990s the Board of Directors at the Zen Center created the "Ethical Principles and Procedures for Grievance and Reconciliation" for its members, for conflict resolution mediation guided by Buddhist precepts. In 1995 Zoketsu Norman Fischer was installed as Abbot at SFZC, and in 1996 Zenkai Blanche Hartman was appointed as co-Abbot with him (becoming the first female Abbot in SFZC history).

In the 1980s Baker ordained Issan Dorsey as a priest. This was likely prompted by a conversation between Robert Baker Aitken and Baker at San Francisco Zen Center concerning the question of Zen's availability to interested gay people, for Dorsey went on to become abbot of the Hartford Street Zen Center.

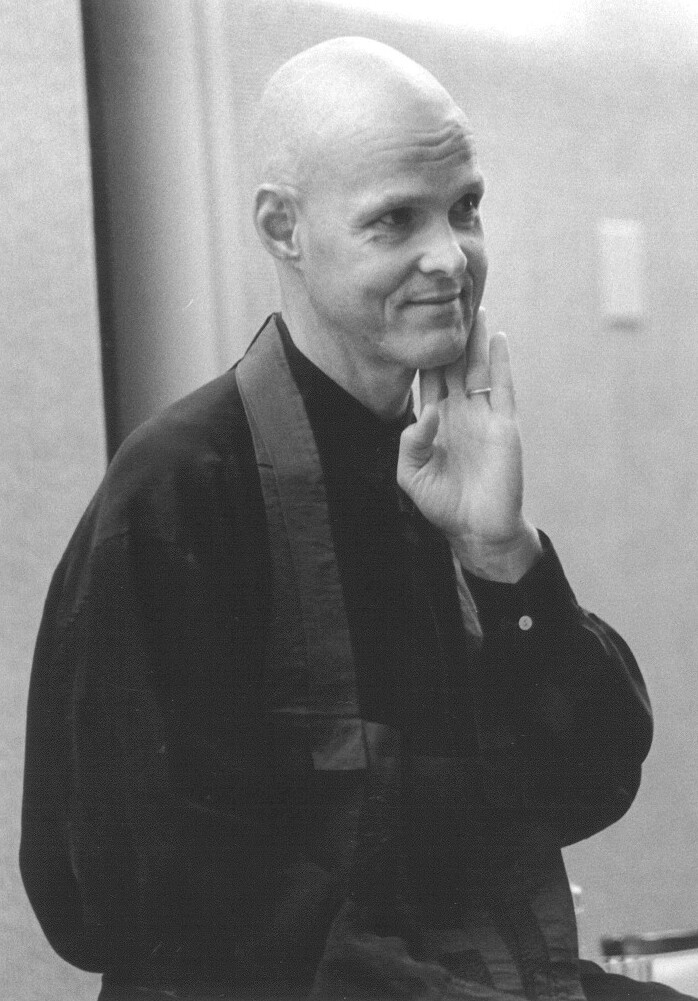
Tenshin Reb Anderson

=== Reb Anderson's tenure ===
In 1983 Tenshin Reb Anderson received shihō from Zentatsu Richard Baker, becoming Baker's first Dharma heir (though Baker disputes this). From 1986 to 1988 he served as abbot of the San Francisco Zen Center, and from 1988 to 1995 he served there as co-abbot with Sojun Mel Weitsman. Anderson became entangled in an incident in 1987 that reached back to 1983— just after Zentatsu Richard Baker had resigned as abbot. While jogging through Golden Gate Park, Anderson deviated from the path to urinate in some bushes. There he found the corpse of a man with a bullet wound to the head and a revolver nearby. Rather than report this to the police, Anderson returned to the body over several days to meditate over the corpse. On one visit he decided to take the revolver home with him. Upon his final visit he found the body no longer there, and a fellow priest in whom he had confided showed him a newspaper article covering the apparent suicide. Five years later (in 1988), roughly fifteen months after Anderson had become abbot of the San Francisco Zen Center, Anderson was arrested for brandishing this same firearm in public. He reported being mugged at knifepoint by a man just a block away from the Zen Center. Anderson remembered stowing the revolver away in the Zen Center's garage and quickly retrieved it. He then drove after the alleged mugger and followed him into a housing project with the revolver (unloaded) in hand, being arrested minutes later by a police officer with his own gun pointed at him.

This 1987 incident has had a damaging impact on Anderson's reputation as a teacher, since his arrest received national media coverage. The leadership of San Francisco Zen Center required Anderson to take a leave of absence from his position as abbot. After six months, he returned to his position. Shocked by the series of scandals involving its senior teachers, the organization decided to appoint two abbots, who would share the position at any one time. Zen priest Mel Weitsman served with Anderson as a co-abbot during the remainder of his term, and the tradition of two sitting Abbots continued for the next few decades.

Regarding this ordeal, Anderson wrote:

On both a personal and a professional level, I am still dealing with the consequences of this episode. Some people felt that I had committed an irrevocable betrayal of trust, and have discounted me and my teaching ever since. Others were more forgiving, but their trust in me and my integrity was permanently shaken. Even newer students, who come to Zen Center and find out about these incidents, are sometimes confused and question whether I can be their teacher. These events are a helpful reminder—both to me and to others—of my vulnerability to arrogance and inflation. I see how my empowerment to protect and care for the Triple Treasure inflated my sense of personal authority, and thus detracted from and disparaged the Triple Treasure. This ancient twisted karma I now fully avow.

=== Zen Hospice Project ===
In 1987 SFZC started the Zen Hospice Project, a volunteer hospice program run out of a guest house on Page Street with five residential beds. Zen Hospice Project also continues to train and coordinate volunteers who provide non sectarian, non-medical care to residents of the hospice and palliative care ward at Laguna Honda Hospital, a skilled nursing facility operated by the City and County of San Francisco. The volunteer project's founding director was Frank Ostaseski, who served until 2004. Zen Hospice Project provides hospice care for individuals of any or no religion who are looking for a compassionate end to their life. Zen Hospice Project was the subject of the Netflix 2018 Academy Award-nominated short documentary End Game, about terminally ill patients in a San Francisco hospital as well as at the Zen Hospice Project house, featuring the work of palliative care physician BJ Miller and other palliative care clinicians.

In 2000, Jiko Linda Cutts was appointed Abbess, having received Dharma transmission from Tenshin Reb Anderson in 1996. In 2003 Paul Haller, who received transmission from Sojun Mel Weitsman in 1993, was installed as co-abbot with her.

== Features ==
=== Tassajara Zen Mind Temple ===
The Tassajara monastery is closed to outsiders from the months of September through April, then opens to the public by reservation from May through August. Students that come to practice at the monastery from September through April must undergo the tradition known as tangaryo. They will sit for five days or longer in the zendo before they are formally admitted into the monastery—a physically daunting challenge.

=== Green Gulch Green Dragon Temple ===
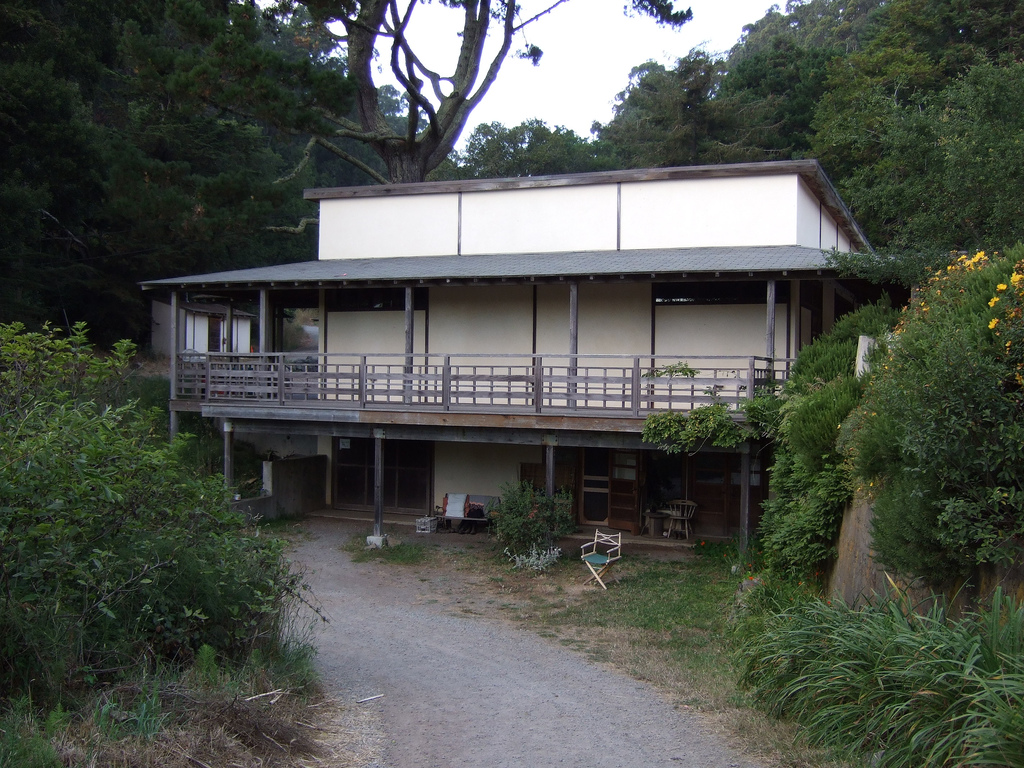
Green Dragon Temple at Green Gulch Farm

The organic farm at Green Gulch supplies local restaurants and food suppliers and sells flowers, produce and herbs at Ferry Plaza Farmers Market in San Francisco. Guests stay at the Lindisfarne Guest House, a traditional Japanese building with a wood-burning stove as the heating source. Zen practice is not required to stay at Green Gulch, though guests are welcome to participate in zazen or any other activities. Tenshin Reb Anderson-roshi, former abbot of City Zen Center, is senior Dharma teacher at Green Gulch—training priests and laypeople, leading sesshins, giving talks and conducting workshops while also living onsite.

== Friends of SFZC ==
SFZC is connected, in an unofficial capacity, to the following Zen Centers:

- Austin Zen Center
- Berkeley Zen Center
- Brooklyn Zen Center
- Chapel Hill Zen Center
- Dharma Vow Zen Sangha, Santa Monica
- Hartford Street Zen Center
- Houston Zen Center
- Kannon Do Zen Meditation Center
- San Antonio Zen Center
- Santa Cruz Zen Center
- Sonoma Mountain Zen Center

== Alumni—partial list ==
- Tenshin Reb Anderson
- Zentatsu Richard Baker
- Angie Boissevain
- Edward Espe Brown
- David Chadwick
- Jiko Linda Cutts
- Issan Dorsey
- Zoketsu Norman Fischer
- Gil Fronsdal
- Ryushin Paul Haller
- Zenkei Blanche Hartman
- Fenton Johnson
- | Dainin Katagiri
- Seirin Barbara Kohn
- Jakusho Kwong
- Joanne Kyger
- Taigen Dan Leighton
- Kobun Chino Otogawa
- Josho Patricia Phelan
- Yvonne Rand
- Furyu Nancy Schroeder
- Maylie Scott
- Hozan Alan Senauke
- Shunryu Suzuki (founder)
- Sojun Mel Weitsman
- Dairyu Michael Wenger
- Philip Whalen
- Wu Bong (Jacob Perl)

== See also ==
- Buddhism in the United States
- Kannon Do Zen Meditation Center
- Timeline of Zen Buddhism in the United States
- Zen in the United States
