= Marian Derby =

Marion Derby (later Marian Wisberg and also known as Marion Mountain) (March 12, 1923 - May 15, 2013) was an author, artist, and zen student of Shunryū Suzuki.

Derby was a puppeteer at one point, working with Frank Oz at the Children's Fairyland Puppet Fair hosted by the San Francisco Puppeteers Guild of America.

Derby was the head of the Los Altos Zen group (which later evolved into the Kannon Do Zen Meditation Center) where Shunryū Suzuki often taught. Derby was responsible for putting together the first draft of Shunryū Suzuki's Zen Mind, Beginner's Mind. Derby's father was driving Suzuki from Los Altos to San Francisco and he inquired about Suzuki's ambition wherein Suzuki replied "I'd like to write a book." After hearing about this conversation from her father, Derby approached Suzuki about taping his lectures and transcribing them. Suzuki later suggested she give the manuscript to Richard Baker who then further refined it with the help of Trudy Dixon.

Under the name Marian Mountain, Derby authored her own book on Zen entitled The Zen Environment: The Impact of Zen Meditation. She was working on a follow-up book entitled Snail Zen when she died.
