= Yvonne Rand =

American Buddhist priest

Yvonne Rand (September 23, 1935 – August 19, 2020)
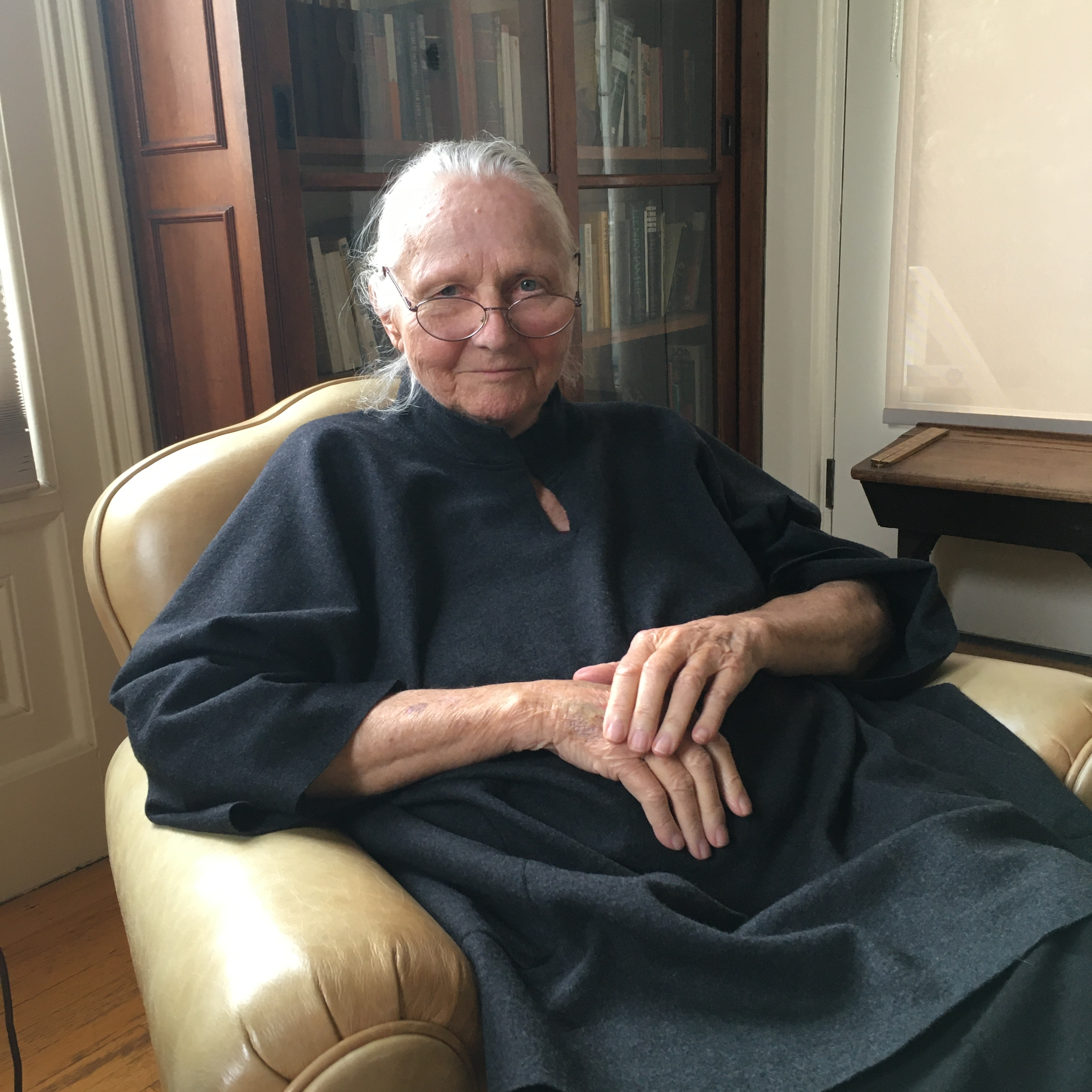
- Yvonne Rand, winter 2020
- Title: Lay householder priest and meditation teacher in the Soto Zen Tradition

Personal life
- Born: September 23, 1935 San Francisco, California, United States
- Died: August 19, 2020 (aged 84)

Religious life
- Religion: Buddhism
- School: Soto Zen; Theravada; Vajrayana
- Website: yvonnerand.org

Yvonne Rand (September 23, 1935 – August 19, 2020), a member of the first generation of American Zen teachers, was a lay householder priest in the Soto Zen Buddhist tradition, active from 1972 until her death in 2020.

== A Soto Zen Buddhist Priest with Teachers in Many Traditions ==
Rand grew up in California and graduated in 1957 from Stanford University, where she began to study the teachings of the Buddha Dharma along with other Eastern religions. She became a close student of Shunryu Suzuki Roshi in 1966, served as his secretary and personal assistant and, with his wife Mitsu Suzuki, cared for him through his dying and death in 1971. She was an early, important member of the San Francisco Zen Center, was ordained as a priest there, served on the board of directors for many years, and continued to practice and teach there for many years, primarily at Green Gulch Farm Zen Center. Rand had been Zen Center secretary in the '60s, President in the '70s, and Chair of the Board in the '80s.

In addition to receiving dharma transmission from Dainin Katagiri Roshi at the Minnesota Zen Center in 1989, she strengthened her understanding of her Soto Zen heritage by studying with many teachers in many Buddhist traditions, including Rinzai Zen with Maurine Stuart Roshi and Shodo Harada Roshi; Theravada Buddhism, with Henepola Gunaratana and her friend Ajahn Sumedho; and the Tibetan Buddhist tradition with the Dalai Lama and Tara Tulku Rinpoche. Rand's extensive work with Tara Tulku Rinpoche led to her active support of the Tibetan Buddhist community in diaspora and to a recognition of the deep connections between Vajrayana and Soto Zen insights and practices. She also formed and studied an extensive collection of Tibetan Buddhist art, as well as taking instruction over many years in Noh chanting and Japanese tea ceremony with Yaeko Nakamura Sensei.

== Goat-in-the-Road: A Place for Buddhist Practice ==
In the 1980s Rand established a place for Buddhist practice in Marin County, California with a focus on Zen, and taught there for many years; she named it Goat-in-the-Road, which derived from her efforts to save young goats destined for the local Greek community auction at Easter time. In 2005 she moved Goat-in-the-Road (also known as Bodaiji, Buddha Mind Temple) to Philo, Mendocino County, where she continued to teach and to lead retreats.Throughout her career, she hosted visiting teachers of different schools, and she taught widely throughout the United States, offering lectures, workshops, conferences, and retreats.

Together with her husband William Wallace Sterling, she co-founded The Callipeplon Society, a nonprofit organization created initially to provide support to Lama Anagarika Govinda and his wife Li Gotami Govinda. The Society later centered its efforts on widening the understanding of Buddhism in the United States and on adapting traditional Buddhist teachings for the lives of lay practitioners.

== A Buddhist Perspective on the End of Life ==
Yvonne Rand was part of the original advisory group that gave birth to the Zen Hospice Project. Her understanding of the inseparability of life and death led her to sit with and tend people in end-of-life care over many decades, and she was actively involved in sitting with people through the early years of the AIDS epidemic. She also taught and counseled extensively both professional and volunteer caregivers working with the terminally ill.

Rand brought a Buddhist perspective to reproductive issues by defending a woman's right to choose while teaching that abortion's moral gravity makes it an option of last resort. Rand was instrumental in developing a ceremony of remembrance in the West called the Jizo Ceremony (after the Japanese Bodhisattva) for children, born and unborn, who have died. This ceremony continues as part of her Dharma legacy, as numerous other Buddhist teachers have taken it up.

== Environment and Art as Elements of Buddhist Practice ==
For many years, beginning in 1970, Rand studied with Harry Kellett Roberts, a widely recognized California native plant specialist trained in the Native American tradition of the Yurok People, who lived with Rand’s family in the last several years of his life. An environmental activist and leader, Rand served on the early board of The Trust for Public Land from 1974 to 1984, the last five years as board chair, working closely with environmentalist Huey Johnson, the Trust’s founder. Her activism extended through both the natural world and the world of environmental concerns. An avid gardener, she brought plants, animals, clouds, and water into her teachings.

In the 2000s Rand served on the steering committee for a five-year research program called AWAKE: Art, Buddhism, and the Dimensions of Consciousness. Artists and writers gravitated to her as a teacher for her understanding of and interest in the arts and the relationship between Buddhist meditation practice and the creative process.

== Personal life ==
Rand, as a lay householder priest, was married for four decades to William Wallace Sterling and had two children from an earlier marriage.

== Living and Teaching with Alzheimer’s ==
In her last years, she became ill with Alzheimer’s disease. She was open about her progressive condition and was able to continue teaching; not despite the illness, but taking it into account. As her losses became more apparent, a student noted that she had never witnessed Rand reacting with frustration or self-criticism to her diminishing capabilities. When asked about this, even with advanced Alzheimer’s, Rand observed with clarity, “I am in the moment as it arises.”

== See also ==
- Buddhism in the United States
- Timeline of Zen Buddhism in the United States
