= Green Gulch =

Green Gulch may refer to:

- Green Gulch Farm Zen Center, a Buddhist center near Muir Beach, California
- Green Gulch mule deer migration corridor, a western Nevada area in the southern Peterson Mountain Range
