= Zen Mind, Beginner's Mind =

Book of teachings by Shunryu Suzuki

- Cover of the first edition
- Author: Shunryu Suzuki; Trudy Dixon and Richard Baker (editors)
- Cover artist: ที่
- Language: English
- Subject: Zen Buddhism
- Published: 1970 (Weatherhill, New York; Tokyo)
- Publication place: United States
- Media type: Print (Paperback)
- Pages: 132
- ISBN: 0-8348-0079-9
- OCLC: 20674253
- Dewey Decimal: 294.3/4435 22
- LC Class: BQ9288 .S994 2006

Zen Mind, Beginner's Mind is a book of teachings by Shunryu Suzuki, a compilation of talks given at his satellite Zen center in Los Altos, California. Published in 1970 by Weatherhill, the book contains transcriptions of Suzuki's talks recorded by his student Marian Derby. Trudy Dixon and Richard Baker (Baker is Suzuki's successor) edited the talks by selecting the most relevant ones and organizing them into chapters. Bodhin Kjolhede, abbot of the Rochester Zen Center, writes that, together with Philip Kapleau's The Three Pillars of Zen (1965), it is one of the two most influential books on Zen in the west.

== See also ==
- Buddhism in the United States
- San Francisco Zen Center
- Shoshin
- Timeline of Zen Buddhism in the United States
