= Richard Baker (Zen teacher) =

American writer and Buddhist monk

Zentatsu Richard Baker
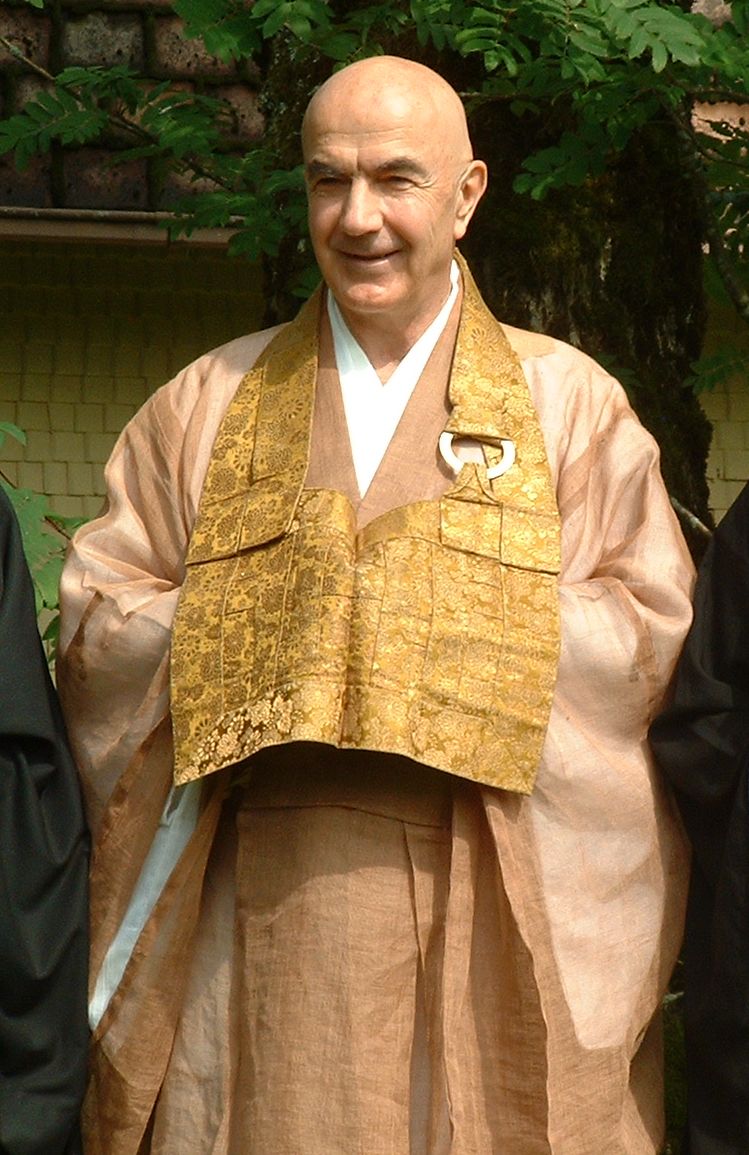
- Title: Zen Master

Personal life
- Born: Richard Dudley Baker; March 30, 1936 (age 90) Biddeford, Maine, United States
- Spouse: 1. Virginia Baker; 2. Princess Marie Louise of Baden (1999–present)
- Children: Elizabeth Baker, Mrs. Jason Kibbey; Sally Baker; Sophia Baker
- Education: Harvard University; University of California, Berkeley
- Website: www.bakerroshi.com www.dharma-sangha.de www.dharmasangha.org

Religious life
- Religion: Buddhism
- School: Sōtō
- Lineage: Shunryu Suzuki
- Dharma name: Zentatsu

Senior posting
- Based in: Crestone Mountain Zen Center; Zen Buddhistisches Zentrum Schwarzwald (Johanneshof)
- Predecessor: Shunryu Suzuki
- Successor: Reb Anderson; Philip Whalen; Issan Dorsey; Dan Welch; Paul Rosenblum; Rocio Maria Hernández Pozo; Gerald Weischede; Ottmar Engel; David Beck; Christian Dillo; Nicole Baden; Laurie Nusbaum

Richard Dudley Baker (born March 30, 1936) is an American Soto Zen master (or roshi), the founder of Dharma Sangha—which consists of Crestone Mountain Zen Center located in Crestone, Colorado and the Zen Buddhist Center Black Forest (Zen-Buddhistisches Zentrum Schwarzwald, or, Johanneshof) in Germany's Black Forest. As the American Dharma heir to Shunryu Suzuki, Baker assumed abbotship of the San Francisco Zen Center (SFZC) shortly before Suzuki's death in 1971. He remained abbot there until 1984, when he resigned his position after it was disclosed in the previous year that he and the wife of one of SFZC's benefactors had been having an affair. Despite the controversy connected with his resignation, Baker was instrumental in helping the San Francisco Zen Center to become one of the most successful Zen institutions in the United States.

== Early life and education ==
Richard Baker was born in Biddeford, Maine, on March 30, 1936, the son of Harold Baker and Elisabeth Dudley. Because his family moved around frequently, he lived in Cambridge, Massachusetts, Indiana, and Pittsburgh growing up. A descendant of Thomas Dudley, Baker was raised in a family of modest means, but a scholarship allowed him to attend Harvard University, where he studied architecture and history. He then arrived in San Francisco, California in 1960—beginning to sit with Shunryu Suzuki in 1961. Baker was ordained a Sōtō priest by Suzuki in 1966 just before the opening of Tassajara Zen Mountain Center. Baker was instrumental in orchestrating the acquisition of Tassajara, raising $150,000 for the purchase in a short period of time. From 1968 to 1971, he traveled to Japan to practice at the primary Sōtō monasteries there, including Antaiji, Eiheiji, and Daitokuji.

== Career ==
=== San Francisco Zen Center ===
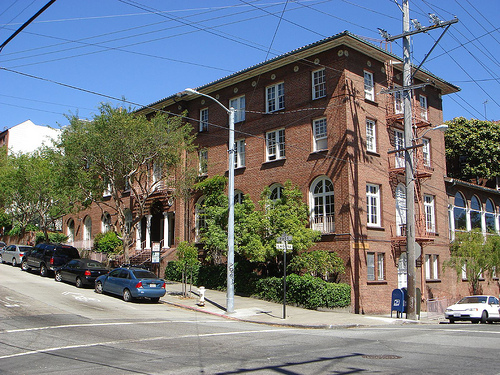
San Francisco Zen Center's Page St. location

Baker received Dharma transmission from Suzuki in 1970, and then was installed as abbot of San Francisco Zen Center during the "Mountain Seat Ceremony" on November 21, 1971. Baker also penned the introduction to Suzuki's famous book, Zen Mind, Beginner's Mind. Within a very short period of time Baker broadened the scope of SFZC, starting first with the acquisition of Green Gulch Farm in southern Marin county, in 1972.

San Francisco Zen Center expanded quickly with Baker at the helm. In fifteen years, the center's annual budget increased from $6,000, to $4 million. It acquired property worth around $20 million and built up a network of affiliated businesses staffed by Zen Center students, which included the vegetarian Greens Restaurant in Fort Mason, a bakery, and a grocery store. In the midst of the growth, Baker became a popular public figure. Although his salary was reportedly modest, he lived a lifestyle which many perceived as extravagant. With so many students and so much public attention, some felt Baker became less available to the members of the community. All of this discontent emerged when it was made public that Baker had allegedly been having an affair with the wife of an influential sangha member.

==== Resignation ====
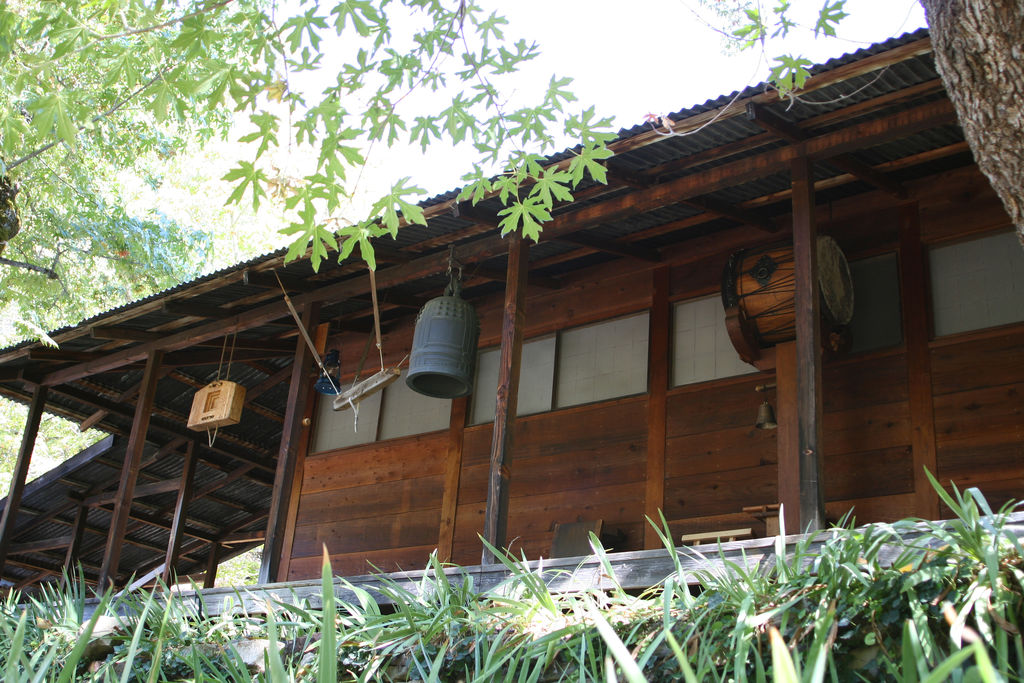
The zendo at Tassajara Zen Mountain Center

Although Baker claimed that his relationship with the woman was a love-affair which had not yet been consummated, the outcry surrounding the incident led to a series of accusations of impropriety on Baker's part, including the admissions by several female members of the community that they had had affairs with Baker before or during his tenure as abbot. The community's sense of crisis sharpened when the woman's husband, one of SFZC's primary benefactors, threatened to hold the organization legally responsible for its abbot's apparent misconduct.

These revelations led to community-wide pandemonium, and in 1984 Baker was forced to resign as abbot. However, San Francisco Zen Center's website now comments: "Although the circumstances leading to his resignation as abbot in 1984 were difficult and complex, in recent years, there has been increased contact; a renewal of friendship and dharma relations." And Baker, for his part, is quoted as having said in a 1994 interview with Sugata Schneider:

I don't think that the gossipy or official versions of what happened are right, but I feel definitely that if I were back in the situation again as the person I am now, it wouldn't have happened. Which means it's basically my fault. I had a kind of insecurity and self-importance, which I didn't see for a long time, that was a bad dynamic in the community.

In 1983 Tenshin Reb Anderson received shiho (Dharma Transmission) from Richard Baker. Anderson succeeded him as abbot, and later co-abbot.

In the late-1980s Baker also gave shiho to Issan Dorsey, whom he had ordained as a priest in 1975. Dorsey went on to serve as abbot of the Hartford Street Zen Center in San Francisco, where he worked to develop hospice care for AIDS patients.

A once controversial figure, Richard Baker was publicly criticized for his behavior at San Francisco Zen Center. Former students have said that he was addicted to power, abusive of his position, extravagant in his personal spending, and inappropriate in his love life. On the other hand, he was and continues to be appreciated for his significant contribution to the development of Buddhism within a Western cultural paradigm. Thich Nhat Hanh wrote of Baker, "To me, he embodies very much the future of Buddhism in the West with his creative intelligence and his aliveness."

=== Dharma Sangha ===
Following his departure from the San Francisco Zen Center in 1984, Baker still felt committed to continue his teacher’s lineage and to generally help establish Buddhism in the West. He relocated to Santa Fe, New Mexico where he founded a new community known as Dharma Sangha. Subsequently, the educational nonprofit foundation Lindisfarne Association gave their campus in Crestone, Colorado, to Baker’s Dharma Sangha. Baker took up residence there and expanded the campus, which originally consisted of the passive solar Lindisfarne Fellows House, a so-called Founder’s House, and the dome-shaped Lindisfarne Chapel. He built a traditional Japanese Zendo with seating for several dozen practitioners, a guesthouse, and additional structures. Some of these projects were funded by Laurance Rockefeller, who had previously contributed significant donations to SFZC.

==== Emerging Connections with European Practitioners ====
While developing his new practice place, Crestone Mountain Zen Center, CMZC, Baker simultaneously established connections to Europe in the mid-1980s. In 1983, he was first invited to speak at two conferences in Austria and Switzerland. Afterwards, he was invited to return for further conferences and asked to offer seminars, too. A group of—mostly beginning—European Zen practitioners started to gather around him. In 1989, he offered his first Sesshin, a traditional week-long Zen retreat, in Europe.

For him, this marked a significant turning point in his commitment to practitioners in Europe. “As long as I was only offering seminars, I could still choose not to return the next year. But a Sesshin triggers very different kinds of processes than a weekend seminar does. It’s a substantial step towards a real teacher-student-relationship. Once you’ve done that with people, you can’t leave them alone anymore. You’ll have to continue, offer a second Sesshin, and a third and a fourth one”, he is quoted in a book about Dharma Sangha Europe. So from 1989 on, he offered two week-long Sesshins per year in Germany. Between 1990 and 1996, these Sesshins were held at Haus der Stille, a renowned Buddhist retreat center near Hamburg, Germany.

Several old students from his time at SFZC had followed Baker to Dharma Sangha. One of them was the poet Philip Whalen, who Baker had ordained as a priest in 1973. Whalen became tanto, head monk, of the new center in Crestone and helped Baker develop the community in Europe, too. In July 1987 Baker gave Dharma transmission to Whalen; Whalen later followed Issan Dorsey as abbot at Hartford Street Zen Center in San Francisco's Castro district.

==== Establishing a Residential Practice Center in Europe ====
In the late 1980s, some European Zen students who wanted to practice residentially with Baker for more than one Sesshin-week at a time, started coming to Crestone. In the mid-1990s, after the new zendo was completed, Baker began offering annual practice periods, also referred to as Ango, at Crestone: Ango is considered an intense form of Zen practice geared towards more experienced practitioners. People traditionally commit to staying on the temple grounds for the entire duration of practice period, which typically lasts for 90 days. The ability to offer Ango at Dharma Sangha was a significant step towards deeper, more dedicated practice for the community.

In 1996, Dharma Sangha’s European branch acquired Johanneshof, its own residential practice center, at the edge of a village in Germany’s Black Forest region. (Johanneshof was how the place had previously been called, but the old name stuck and is used to the day, unofficially.) A few sangha members moved in as permanent residents, many others came for Baker’s seminars and Sesshins, which were now mainly happening at Johanneshof. (Although he kept paying regular visits to some German and Austrian cities, where he offered seminars to local communities.) Just like at CMZC, residents at the new European center structured their daily lives according to a monastic schedule which included morning and evening zazen, shared formal meals in the traditional ōryōki style, and extensive periods of work practice, among other things.

In 2012, Dharma Sangha Europe purchased three additional buildings right across the street from Johanneshof. One of them, an architecture and design firm’s former office building, was repurposed as a residential building, with the ground floor being remodelled as a seminar space. Another building, previously the firm’s carpentry workshop, was remodelled as a traditional Japanese Zendo and Buddha Dharma hall—the former is exclusively used for zazen, Zen meditation, while daily service and other ceremonies are typically held in the latter. To the day, the extended campus is officially called Zen-Buddhist Center Black Forest (German: Zen-Buddhistisches Zentrum Schwarzwald, ZBZS).

==== Deepening Practice, Developing Centers ====
In 2013, Baker offered his first Ango at ZBZS, which became an annual tradition until it had to be cancelled due to the Covid-19 pandemic in 2020. In 2022, a group of longtime Zen students privately bought another neighbouring building, as a place where they could live permanently and participate in activities at ZBZS. In 2024, ZBZS bought a former school in a neighbouring village, with the intention to create apartments for senior staff and (semi-)retired sangha members. Baker often emphasized that a key to the development of Western Buddhist centers was their ability to offer ways of participation even for aging residents who might not be able to fully follow the monastic schedule anymore. These latest acquisitions were considered an essential step towards realizing that very ambition at ZBZS.

With regard to the centers he himself helped develop in general, Baker often said that their specific physical shape was also shaping the way people were able to practice there. He conceived of centers and campuses as mandalas, or in other words, as relational fields in which buildings, practitioners, animals, plants, and even stones were constantly referring to each other. He often got involved in seemingly minute architectural and design details at his centers, and he acquired a significant number of historical artworks and statues for them, which he considered essential for his approach to practice.

Throughout the early 2020s, Baker intensified his efforts at reconnecting with SFZC. Together with his longtime disciple and chosen successor, Tatsudo Nicole Baden Roshi, he paid several visits to SFZC, where he was received by current and former abbots. In 2023, both Dharma Sangha centers joined Branching Streams, a network of practice centers in the lineage of Shunryu Suzuki, which is organized through SFZC, and Branching Streams organizer Tova Green, a SFZC teacher herself, visited Baden and Baker at ZBZS.

==== Resignation, Reconciliation and Legacy ====
In September 2024, at the age of 88, Richard Baker officially resigned from his position as abbot of the two Dharma Sangha centers. Both his resignation and Baden’s installment as Dharma Sangha’s new abbot happened during a formal Mountain Seat Ceremony. Among the hundreds of guests who attended were SFZC’s central abbot, David Zimmerman, and several former abbots or senior teachers such as Fu Schroder, Norman and Kathie Fischer, Tova Green, and Victoria Austin. Some of them have known Baker since the 1960s or 70s and personally lived through the crisis of 1983. Their attendance at the ceremony was perceived as a significant expression of healing and reconciliation. Other guests included Shunryu Suzuki’s son and grandson, Hoitsu and Shungo Suzuki, who are both Zen teachers, too.

In a panel discussion during the event, David Chadwick, a Zen priest and Shunryu Suzuki's biographer, described Baker's impact and significance with these words: „Many people have been important in my life. Who I am now is the result of all the people I’ve known and interacted with. But there’s only two people that, if you take them out of the equation, I wouldn’t be here. And actually none of you would be either. And that is, of course, Shunryu Suzuki and Richard Baker Roshi.“

Over the course of his life, Richard Baker has given dharma transmission in the lineage of Shunryu Suzuki to twelve disciples, thus authorizing them as independent teachers. They are: Reb Anderson, Issan Dorsey, Philip Whalen, Dan Welch, Paul Rosenblum, Rocio Maria Hernández Pozo, Gerald Weischede, Ottmar Engel, David Beck, Christian Dillo, Nicole Baden, and Laurie Nusbaum.

Baker continues to teach at both Dharma Sangha centers. He offers a free weekly dharma lecture on Sundays, which is broadcast online. In recent years, he also took up the practice of writing poetry, and he occasionally reads at public events.

=== Core concerns and teachings ===
Although Richard Baker’s approach to teaching has significantly evolved over the past six decades, many of his core teachings and concerns have remained the same. According to him, Buddhism provides an alternative way of viewing and being in the world—one that can be truly transformative both for the individual and on a societal level. As such, he considers the Buddhist worldview to be much more wholesome and conducive to sanity than the conventional Western worldview, which he perceives as delusional in many ways.

==== Establishing (Zen-)Buddhist practice in the West ====
Since the 1960s, Baker’s core concern has been the establishment of (Zen-)Buddhist practice in the West. Baker believes that the essence of Zen as he has received it from his Japanese teachers can be authentically transmitted within Western culture. However, such a transmission can only work when the specific forms of practice are adapted for people who have been socialized in a Western cultural framework. One example for this are the residential or monastic practice places Baker helped create: While their core practice closely resembles the way practice is happening in traditional Japanese temples or monasteries, other elements are more modern or Western. This includes their economic foundation: Unlike Japanese temples, which are largely funded through donations from the community, Baker’s centers needed to develop their own economic models. While all the Western centers he (co)-created did and continue to receive substantial donations, they also rely on charging fixed fees for Zen retreats and renting out spaces to external retreat and seminar facilitators. Zen students work as kitchen staff, in housekeeping, guest management, and other roles, and this is considered a key part of their spiritual practice. Baker first implemented such a model with Suzuki Roshi, his teacher, in the 1960s at SFZC’s Tassajara Zen Mountain Center. Today it is widely used by many Buddhist retreat centers around the world.

Another way in which Baker adapted Zen teachings to the needs of Western students is his teaching style. The traditional Japanese approach to teaching Zen emphasizes close observation and careful imitation of the teacher by the student. This usually happens in a monastic setting where teacher and student live and practice together for many years. At SFZC, Baker still taught for a larger monastic or residential community, which allowed him to rely on the traditional model of implicit teaching. But at his new community, Dharma Sangha, most students have their own homes, from which they occasionally travel to meet Baker or another teacher for shorter periods of shared practice. These days, Baker feels he needs to teach much more explicitly, meaning he will often explain and spell out how certain Zen rituals and concepts work.

However, this style of teaching presupposes the existence of words that can describe such concepts and ideas. Baker points out that English and other Western languages do not actually have words for many basic Buddhist or Asian cultural concepts and experiences, which he considers fundamental for Zen practice. According to him, many words that are generally used to describe Zen or Buddhist practice carry inappropriate Western or Christian connotations. Consequently, he considers it essential for the establishment of Buddhist practice in the West to develop a new dharma vocabulary—or “dharmacabulary”, as he likes to call it. In recent years, his creative efforts at doing just that have become a signature feature of his talks. Ultimately, these newly created terms are supposed to create new possibilities of thinking and speaking about practice.

Baker has formulated four key assumptions that underlie all his teachings, which he calls the four possibles: 1. Personal and societal transformation is possible. 2. Freedom from mental suffering is possible. 3. Living close to how we fundamentally exist is possible. 4. Living in ways beneficial to all sentience and things is possible.

==== Fundamentals of a Zen-Buddhist/Yogic world view ====
Baker emphasizes that Zen-Buddhism is based on a Yogic worldview, which becomes practicable and liveable through Zen. According to him, the core assumptions of Yogic cultures differ from those of Western cultures in fundamental ways. In his teachings he usually refrains from statements about the accuracy or truth of either cultural paradigm. Instead, he encourages his students to—at least temporarily—adopt key assumptions from the Yogic paradigm and observe whether that changes their way of being in the world towards a more wholesome orientation. These key assumptions or differentiations include:

- Relationality versus reality: Baker posits that conventional Western worldviews assume the existence of a reality that exists independent of the person who perceives it. According to that view, what is “out there” has an inherent reality, and the most a person can aspire to is to perceive it more accurately. Yogic culture, on the other hand, suggests what Baker dubs a shared relationality, instead of a shared reality. It assumes that nobody and no thing possesses an inherent identity or quality, only a potential which is realized in an ever changing field of relations with other things or people. In order to explain this, Baker sometimes refers to how the board games go and chess differ from each other. Go stands for the Yogic worldview in this analogy, and chess for the Western worldview: Baker points out that in chess, each piece has its inherent, distinct way of impacting the game. The way a king may move across the board differs from the way a queen, knight, or pawn may move across the board. In go, on the other hand, all pieces are fundamentally the same. But the way one piece may impact the game depends—and constantly changes—according to its position in the relational field with all other pieces.
- Continuity versus succession: Western culture usually imagines human consciousness as an uninterrupted, continuous flow of experience. According to this view, each cognition (meaning thoughts, feelings, and sense perceptions) flows into the next one, without any pause between them. Baker points out that a person who subscribes to this concept—as people from a Western paradigm usually and non-consciously do—will likely locate their sense of identity in this uninterrupted stream of cognition, since that is all they ever experience. However, the experienced cognitions are the product of cultural, social, and biographical conditioning, and thus limiting: Many people in the West have the sense that they are defined by key biographical events and factors, and that the most they can hope for is a certain degree of maturation, growth, or refinement of their personality. Baker on the other hand suggests that practitioners perceive their experience as a succession of distinct moments, which, in practice, are even separated by a sense of a pause between them. This pause, if actually noticed and practiced, can give rise to original mind, meaning truly spontaneous impulses that transcend the conditioned patterns of a person’s biographical identity.
- Awareness versus consciousness: Baker uses the term consciousness to describe an uninterrupted continuity or stream of conceptualized experience, as assumed in Western culture (see above). Whatever arises in consciousness does so in response to what has previously been in consciousness. As such, it follows specific personal or reactive patterns, which are conditioned and have a narrow focus. Awareness, on the other hand, is used to describe an open, free, and field-like quality of experience, in which truly spontaneous and original impulses can emerge.
- Activity versus entity: This distinction expands on the above differentiations. Western culture usually considers beings and things as separate and fixed entities. Examples for entities could be “man”, “woman”, “lawyer”, “teacher”, “tree”, “bird”, “stone”. Baker points out that entities are imagined to possess or consist of specific, fixed qualities. A person who sees a “tree” does not see what is actually happening in front of them, but only their personal, mentally constructed concept of what the entity “tree” entails for them. And what specifically a person sees will largely depend on their specific sense of identity. (For example, a person who identifies as a logger and a person who identifies as a birdwatcher have very different ways of relating to trees. They might look at the same tree and yet have two very different visual and cognitive experiences.) In Yogic culture, on the other hand, there is no entity “tree”, only an ever changing process or activity, which is why Baker sometimes suggests that the verb “treeing” would be a more accurate term to describe what we usually refer to with the noun “tree”. Adopting this worldview, Baker argues, enables a person to experience and relating to what is actually happening in the moment, instead of only labeling and conceptualizing it.
- Momentary versus biographical identity: This distinction weaves the above differentiations together. According to Baker, a person from a Western cultural paradigm usually locates their sense of identity in their culturally, socially, and biographically constructed personality, which manifests as conditioned thoughts, emotions, and learned patterns of perceptions, among other things. This process—of identifying with one’s personality—is so deeply ingrained that it usually happens automatically and non-consciously. It seems entirely choiceless to most Western people, and the idea that there might be an alternative could feel completely foreign or absurd. Baker, however, posits that identifying with one’s personality is just a learned cultural habit to which the Yogic cultural paradigm presents a viable alternative. This alternative, he explains, consists of placing one’s sense of identity in a momentary, ever shifting field of experience and relationality, meaning in the experience of whatever appears in one’s field of vision, hearing, smelling, tasting, touching, and otherwise feeling. That way, the biographically conditioned continuity of experience is interrupted, and truly original, spontaneous impulses can occur. Although a biographically conditioned personality remains intact, it ceases to be one’s locus of identity. Baker sometimes talks about “locationing” one’s identity—the gerund locationing, which he himself has coined, is meant to emphasize how this process involves both choice and activity. In other words, a person may consciously choose to shift the location of their identity from their personality to their field of momentary experience and relationality. And this is not just done once. Instead, it is an activity or practice that a practitioner can engage in each and every moment. One of its possible effects is a shift from perceiving oneself as an entity to perceiving oneself as a process or activity.
- Pausing and unitizing experience: These are basic, core practices Baker suggests for practitioners who would like to cultivate a worldview according to the above assumptions of Yogic culture. A person may engage in the practice of perceiving units of experience one after the other, instead of conceiving of their experience as an uninterrupted stream. This could be as basic as feeling one inhale, one exhale, one step, or the sight of a tree, a stone, or a person. Each unit of experience is perceived of as arising, lasting, and ending—which is the definition of a ‘dharma’. Between any two units of experience, there is the potential to pause. The next unit of experience can then arise spontaneously from that very pause, instead of from conditioned thinking.
- Construction of reality and identity: Baker uses the above distinctions to demonstrate that reality and identity are always constructed from a so-called internality – which is projected as an externality on the cultural board. Human beings have a choice as to how, and in reference to what, this construction occurs. In the Western cultural paradigm, the construction of identity is usually shaped by individual biographical events, and people are not aware of the possibility to participate in said construction, which can lead to the creation and persistence of immense suffering. The Yogic cultural paradigm on the other hand makes it obvious that a being can actively participate in the construction of identity and reality. According to Baker, Zen practice suggests to use the ideal of a Bodhisattva—a being who is committed to the liberation of all beings—as a model or reference point for constructing one’s identity. That, he says, leads to sanity and the cessation of suffering.
- Separation versus connection (or "not abandoning any beings"): Combined, the above distinctions point to another fundamental key difference between Western and Yogic culture. In many ways, the former assumes and cultivates a sense of individualistic separation, which can lead to suffering, whereas the latter assumes and cultivates a sense of boundless connection, which can lead to the cessation of suffering. Baker says that the Yogic cultural paradigm is actually closer to the way in which we fundamentally exist—and closer to the findings of contemporary science. He emphasizes that Zen practice as wisdom can only truly happen with an attitude of “not abandoning any beings”. This is to say, a practitioner can never just practice for their own benefit, which would ultimately fall under the Western paradigm, but always needs to cultivate an awareness of their boundless connection with all beings, as described in the Bodhisattva ideal.

== Personal life ==
On September 25, 1999, in Salem, Baker married Marie Louise, daughter of Maximilian, Margrave of Baden, and grandniece of Elizabeth II and Prince Philip, Duke of Edinburgh. They have a daughter, born in Alamosa, Colorado, on March 10, 2001. He has two daughters from a prior marriage to Virginia Baker.

== See also ==
- Householder in Buddhism
- Index of Buddhism-related articles
- Schools of Buddhism
- Secular Buddhism
- Timeline of Zen Buddhism in the United States
