= David Chadwick (writer) =

American Zen Buddhist and writer (1945–2026)

David Chadwick (February 9, 1945 – February 23, 2026) was an American writer and Buddhist priest. Born in Fort Worth, Texas, he moved to California in 1966 to study Zen as a student of Shunryu Suzuki. Chadwick was ordained as a priest in 1971, shortly before Suzuki's death. He assisted in the operation of the San Francisco Zen Center for a number of years.

Chadwick had two children and lived for many years in California before relocating to Bali. Among his works are Thank You and OK! An American Zen Failure in Japan, an account of his time training at a monastery in Japan, and Crooked Cucumber, a biography of Shunryu Suzuki. He was devoted to chronicling the life and teachings of his teacher, Shunryu Suzuki Roshi, and maintained an extensive archival project at his website, Cuke.com.

Chadwick died of cancer at a hospital near his home in Bali, on February 23, 2026, at the age of 81.

== Works ==
- Chadwick, David (1994). Thank You and OK!: An American Zen Failure in Japan. Republished by Shambhala Publications (2007). ISBN 1-59030-470-5. Originally Penguin Arkana.
- Chadwick, David (1999). Crooked Cucumber: the Life and Zen Teaching of Shunryu Suzuki. Broadway Books. ISBN 0-7679-0104-5. Ebook, audiobook, Shambhala Publications
- Chadwick, David (2007). Zen Is Right Here: Teaching Stories and Anecdotes of Shunryu Suzuki, Author of Zen Mind, Beginner's Mind Shambhala Publications (2007) ISBN 1-59030-491-8. audiobook. Originally To Shine One Corner of the World: Moments with Shunryu Suzuki. (2001) Broadway Books
- Chadwick, David (2019). To Find the Girl from Perth. Cuke Press. Originally (2008) Speir Publishing
- Chadwick, David (2019) (text), Atkeison, Andrew (illustrations). Color Dreams for To Find the Girl from Perth. Cuke Press. Originally (2009) Speir Publishing
- Chadwick, David (2019) The, the Book. Cuke Press. ISBN 978-1732287754 Originally Chadwick, Chavid (2011). The. Speir Publishing
- Chadwick, David (2011). Afterword to Zen Mind, Beginner's Mind 40th Anniversary Issue. Shambhala Publications. ISBN 978-1590308493
- Chadwick, David (2020) Afterword to Zen Mind, Beginner's Mind 50th Anniversary Issue. Shambhala Publications. ISBN 978-1611808414
- Chadwick, David (2018) Forward, Editor. A Brief History of Tassajara: From Native American Sweat Lodges to Pioneering Zen Monastery. Cuke Press
- Shunryu, Suzuki; Chadwick, David (editor) (2021). Zen Is Right Now: More Teaching Stories and Anecdotes of Shunryu Suzuki. Shambhala Publications. ISBN 978-1611809145
- Chadwick, David (2025). Tassajara Stories: A Sort of Memoir/Oral History of the First Zen Buddhist Monastery in the West—The First Year, 1967. Monkfish Book Publishing. ISBN 9781958972892
