= Greens Restaurant =

Vegetarian restaurant in San Francisco, California, U.S.

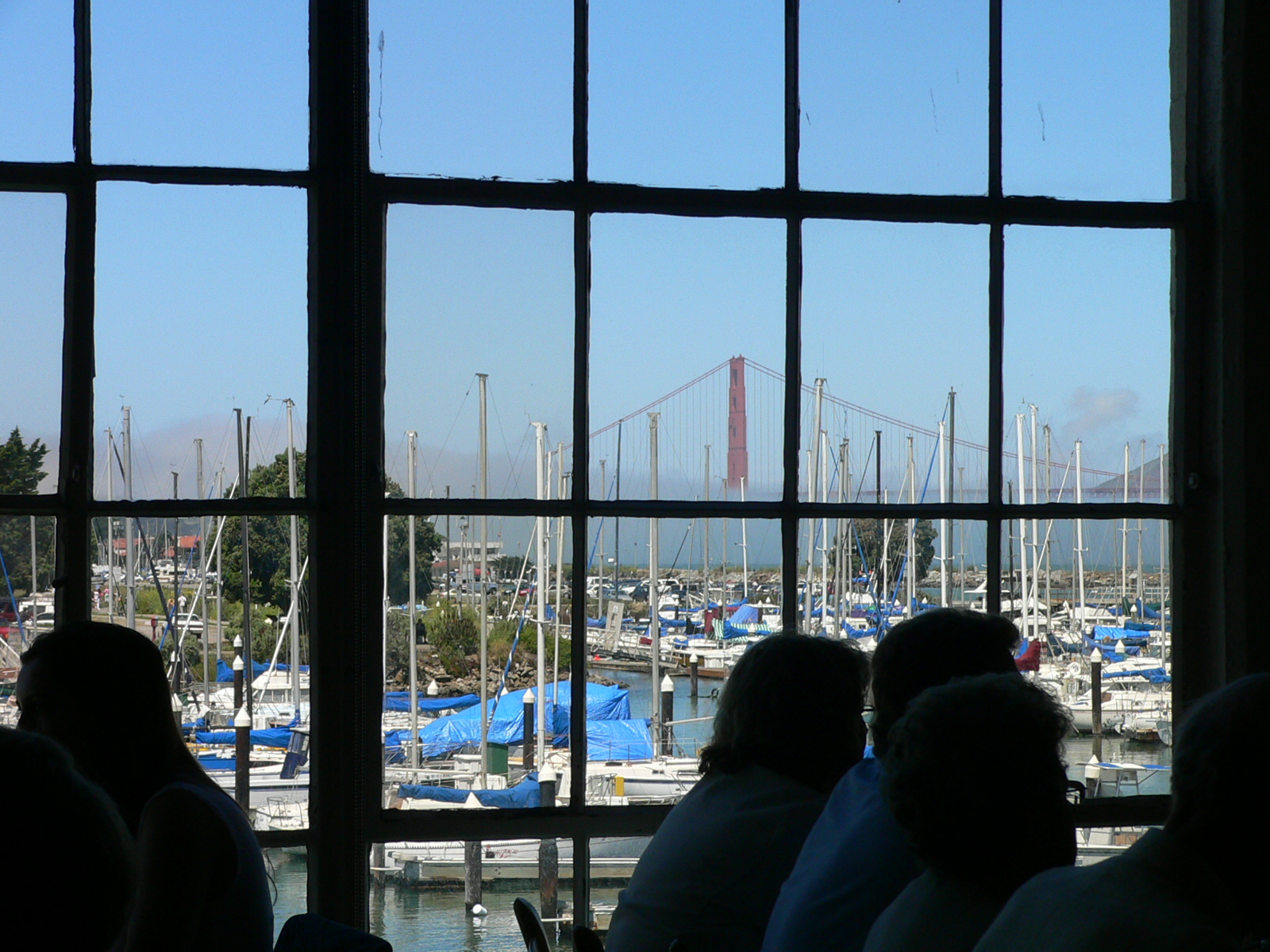
- View out the window of Greens Restaurant
- Interactive map of Greens Restaurant

Restaurant information
- Established: 1979; 47 years ago
- Head chef: Katie Reicher
- Food type: Vegetarian, Local/organic, California
- Location: Building A, 2 Marina Blvd, San Francisco, California, 94123, United States
- Coordinates: 37.80645°N 122.43212°W
- Website: greensrestaurant.com

Greens Restaurant is a landmark vegetarian restaurant in the Fort Mason Center in the Marina District, San Francisco, California, overlooking the Golden Gate Bridge.

== History ==
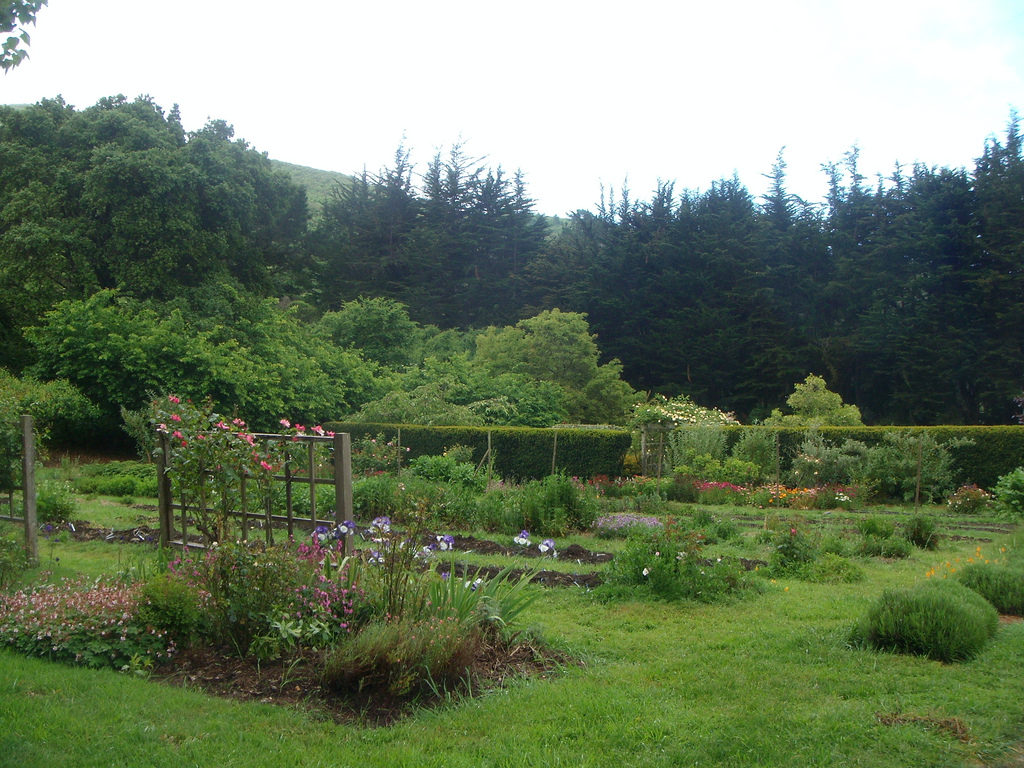
Green Gulch Farm Zen Center

Founded by the San Francisco Zen Center in 1979, Greens has been credited in The New York Times as "the restaurant that brought vegetarian food out from sprout-infested health food stores and established it as a cuisine in America." In its early days, the restaurant's staff was composed of Zen Center students and Zen practice was incorporated into the work routines.

Greens has a legacy of female lead chefs, beginning with founding chef Deborah Madison, and followed by Annie Somerville, Denise St. Onge, and currently Katie Reicher. The restaurant utilizes fresh produce from the organic Green Gulch Farm Zen Center.

== Books ==
- The Greens Cookbook. Deborah Madison with Edward Espe Brown. Random House Broadway imprint. ISBN 0-7679-0823-6, 978-0-7679-0823-8.
- Fields of Greens: New Vegetarian Recipes From The Celebrated Greens Restaurant: A Cookbook. Annie Somerville. Bantam Books. ISBN 978-0553091397, 0553091395.

== See also ==
- California Cuisine
- Chez Panisse
- Moosewood Restaurant
- Tassajara Zen Mountain Center
