= Green Gulch Farm Zen Center =

Zen center in California, United States

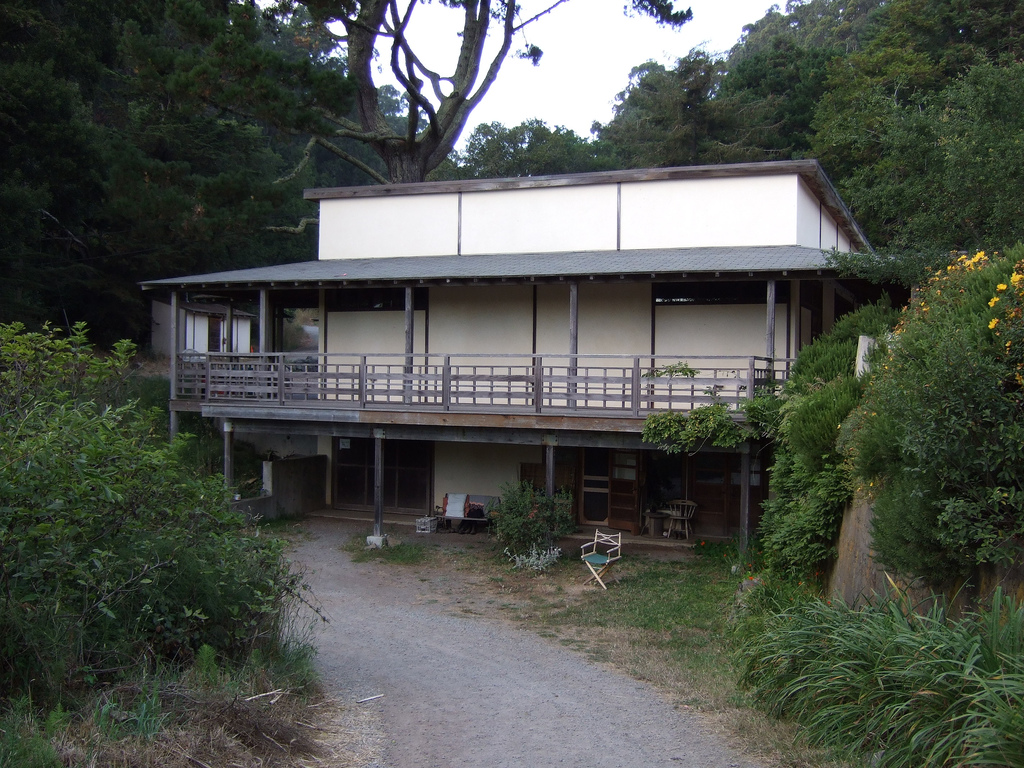
- Zendō of Green Dragon Temple (or, Sōryu-ji)

Religion
- Affiliation: Soto Zen

Location
- Location: 1601 Shoreline Highway, Muir Beach, California 94965
- Country: USA
- Interactive map of Green Gulch Farm Zen Center

Architecture
- Founder: San Francisco Zen Center; Richard Baker
- Completed: 1972

Website
- http://www.sfzc.org

Green Gulch Farm Zen Center, or Sōryu-ji (蒼龍寺 Green Dragon Temple), is a Soto Zen practice center located near Muir Beach, California, that practices in the lineage of Shunryu Suzuki. In addition to its Zen training program, the center also manages an organic farm and gardens. Founded in 1972 by the San Francisco Zen Center and Zentatsu Richard Baker, the site is located on 115 acres (0.47 km^{2}) in a valley seventeen miles (27 km) north of San Francisco and offers a variety of workshops and classes throughout the year. The land is an inholding of the Golden Gate National Recreation Area and has much wildlife within its borders. In addition to meditation retreats, offerings include classes and workshops on the Japanese tea ceremony and gardening. While Green Gulch Farm has a residential monastery and retreat center, guest house, and conference center, it has also become recognized as a place where organic farmers can come to learn the tools of their trade. One of the original architects of the gardens at Green Gulch was the horticulturist Alan Chadwick, who had introduced the biodynamic farming techniques influenced by Rudolf Steiner on the farm. Chadwick's grave is marked by a stupa on site. Author Fenton Johnson writes that Green Gulch Farm, "...serve[s] as a model for living on the land in the context of a Zen Buddhist practice."

== History ==
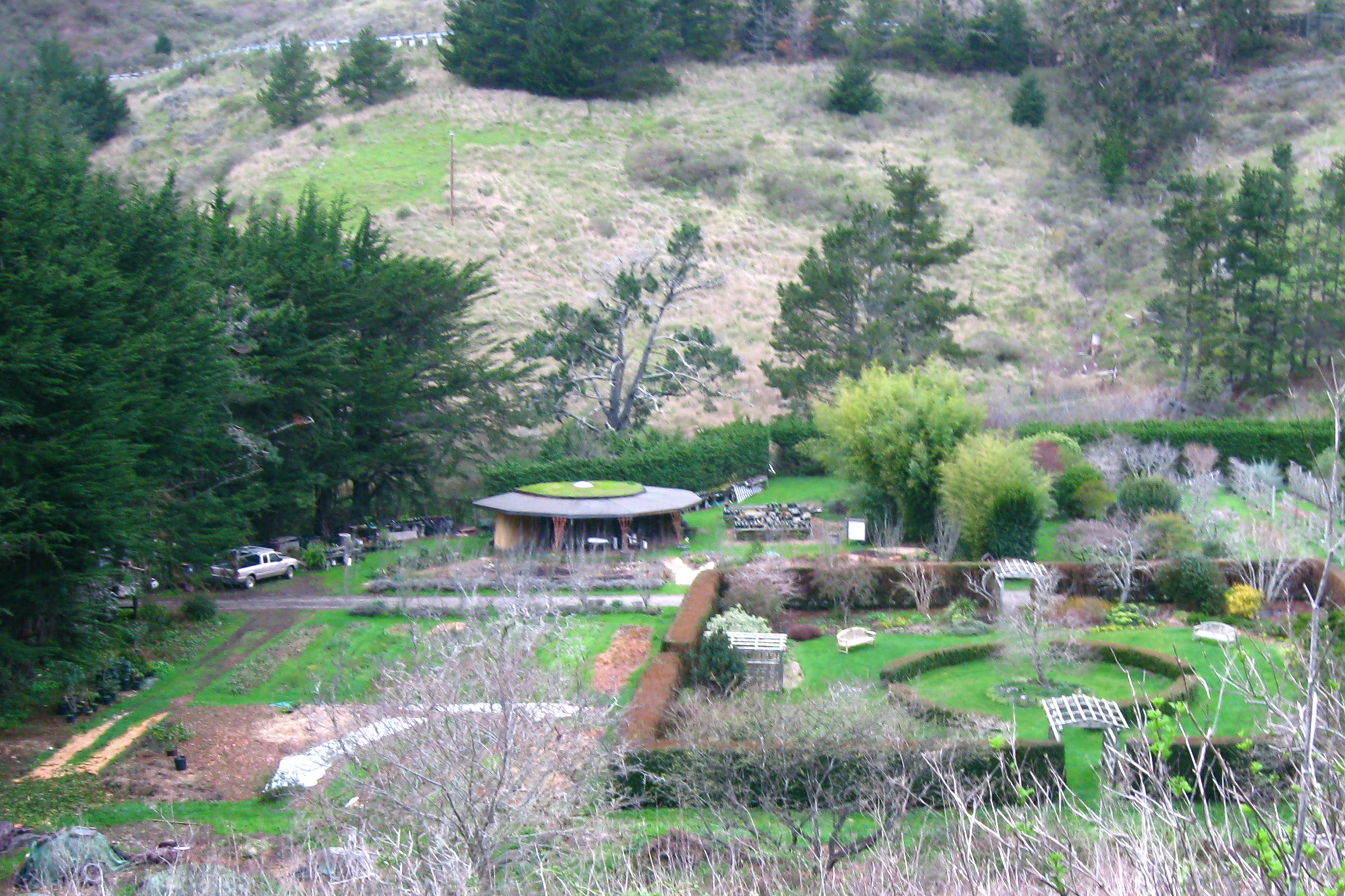
The fruit, herb and flower gardens

Before his death in 1971, Shunryu Suzuki had asked that his sole Dharma heir—Zentatsu Richard Baker—look for a farm near the San Francisco Bay Area where a lay community of practitioners could live amongst one another. When Baker had found just such a place at Green Gulch Farm, some members of the San Francisco Zen Center were hesitant to commit themselves initially to such an endeavor. But Baker saw the area as a place for communal living, where entire families could come together and live as they practiced Zen Buddhism together. So, in the spring of 1972, the farm area was purchased from rancher George Wheelwright (a co-founder of Polaroid). Part of the agreement attached to this sale was the San Francisco Zen Center's commitment to Wheelwright that it would always remain open to the public and engage in agricultural awareness. Community members quickly held various fundraising efforts and constructed their new community, converting a hay barn into the zendo, caring for the land, and building houses.

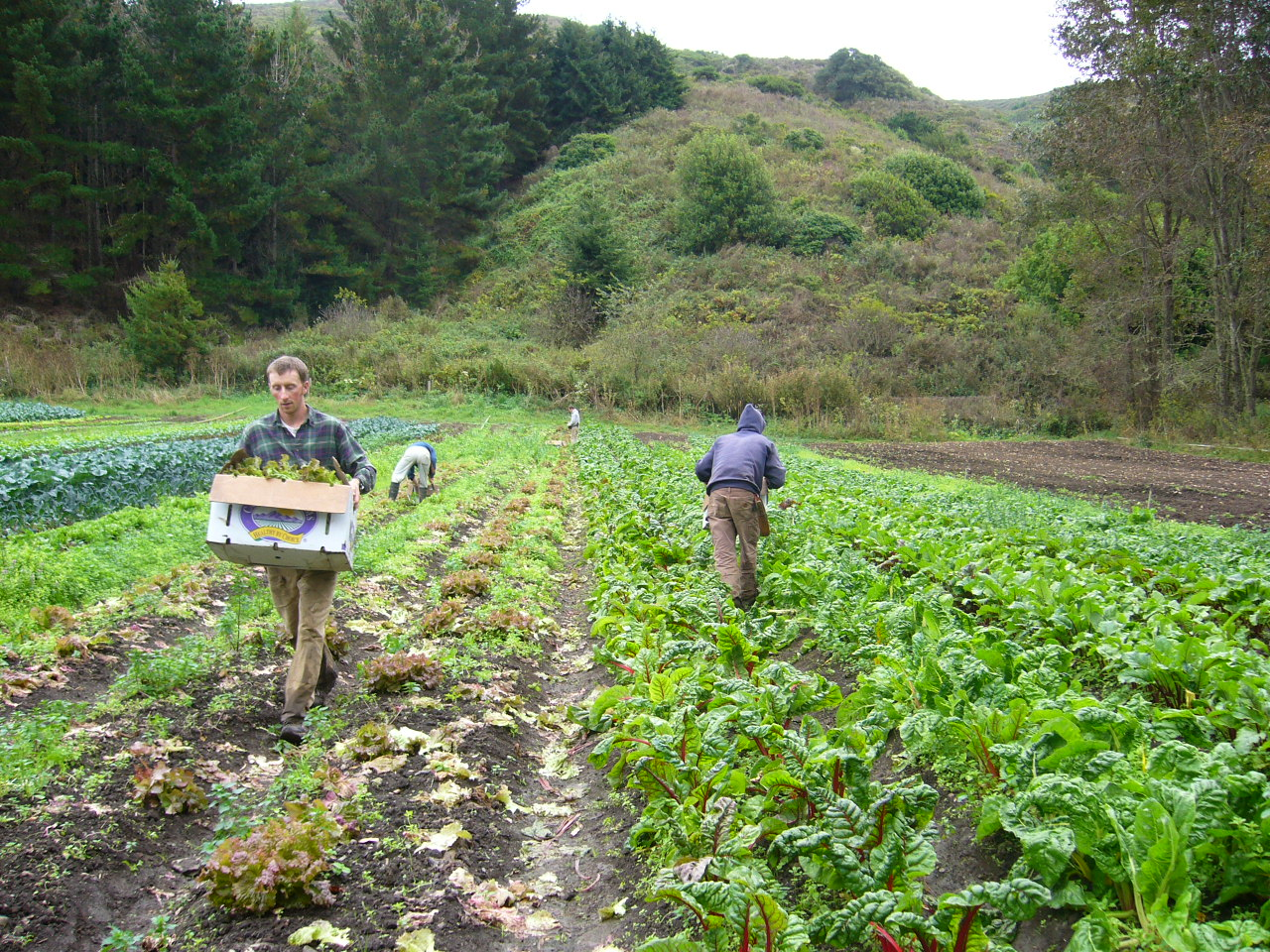
Harvesting the vegetable farm

Green Gulch is particularly concerned with the effects that human beings are having on nature. They hold the philosophy that humans need to protect the environment from us, not the other way around. They do this with religious texts as the basis of such philosophy. Architect Sim Van der Ryn created his first composting toilet for Green Gulch Farm in 1974, built by David Chadwick and Ken Sawyer. Stuart Cowan writes, "The first composter was built in a house at Green Gulch Farm, a Buddhist retreat in nearby Marin County. Soon Sim's neighbor built one, and people started calling for plans. The virtues of the system were that it saved ten to fifteen thousand gallons of water that otherwise would disappear down the toilet each year; it reduced the need for large leach fields, and it literally made people responsible for their own excrement, an idea that was attractive to libertarians, organic purists, outlaw builders, and people engaged in reexamining and redesigning all aspects of their daily lives."

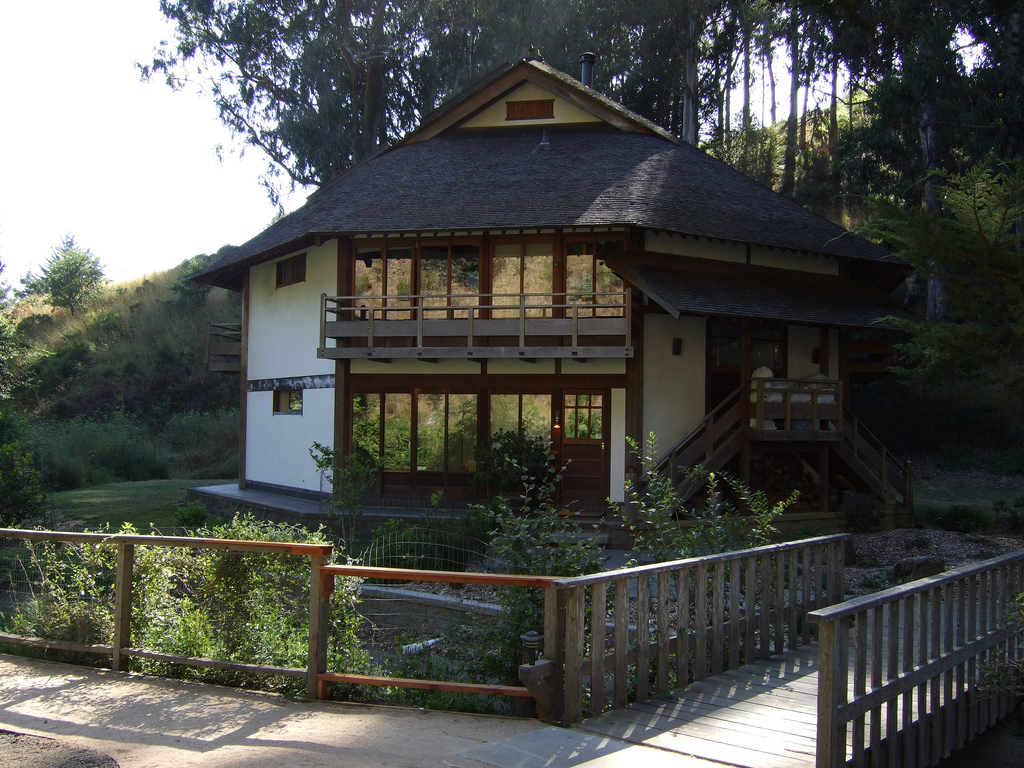
Lindisfarne Guest House

Green Gulch operates, in addition to the Zen center, a 7 or 8-acre (32,000 m^{2}) organic vegetable farm and a 1 to 1.5-acre (6,100 m^{2}) fruit, herb and flower garden. The fruit, herb and flower garden is, "arranged in a series of 'rooms' in the formal English style. In the bowl of the valley is the core of the gardens: an herbal circle of shrubs, roses and perennials, enclosed by a yew hedge with rose arbors and paths out to the larger garden. At the center of the circle is a Japanese snowbell (Styrax japonica) encircled by herbs and lichen-covered rocks." The vegetable farm sustains the community living at Green Gulch and also sells its produce at various local farmers markets and stores. Green Gulch Farm also provides organic produce from the vegetable farm around the year to Greens Restaurant in San Francisco, a vegetarian restaurant founded by the San Francisco Zen Cetner in 1979.

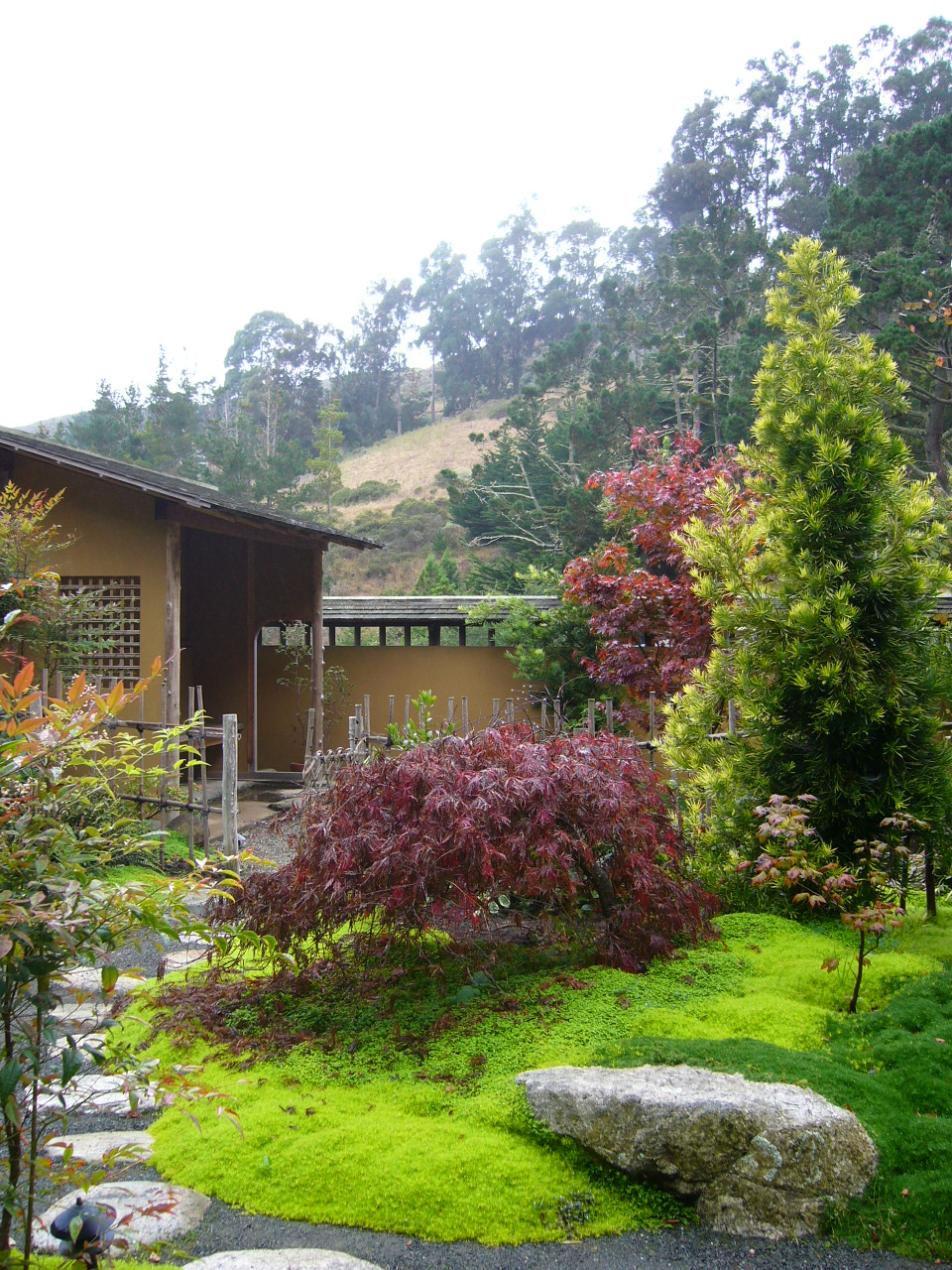
Tea garden

Every Sunday Green Gulch opens to the public for a zazen service followed by a lecture, tea, and lunch. The Green Gulch nursery and garden are open seven days a week, and throughout the year many classes are offered on gardening, pruning, flower arrangement and herb culture. During the summer Green Gulch also offers an apprenticeship program for those interested in becoming organic farmers. Carmen Yuen writes, "The apprentices put nonviolence and mindfulness into action as they work. When digging the soil, they are careful not to expose the worms and split them in half—even if they will regenerate!" Guest houses include the Lindisfarne Guest House and the Wheelright Center. Lindisfarne is in the shape of an octagon, complete with twelve rooms, six baths and an atrium with a woodburning stove. For larger families, the Wheelwright Center has larger living areas for families and a suite equipped with a kitchen. At the Mountain Gate Study Center, classes in Buddhist practice and philosophy are offered.

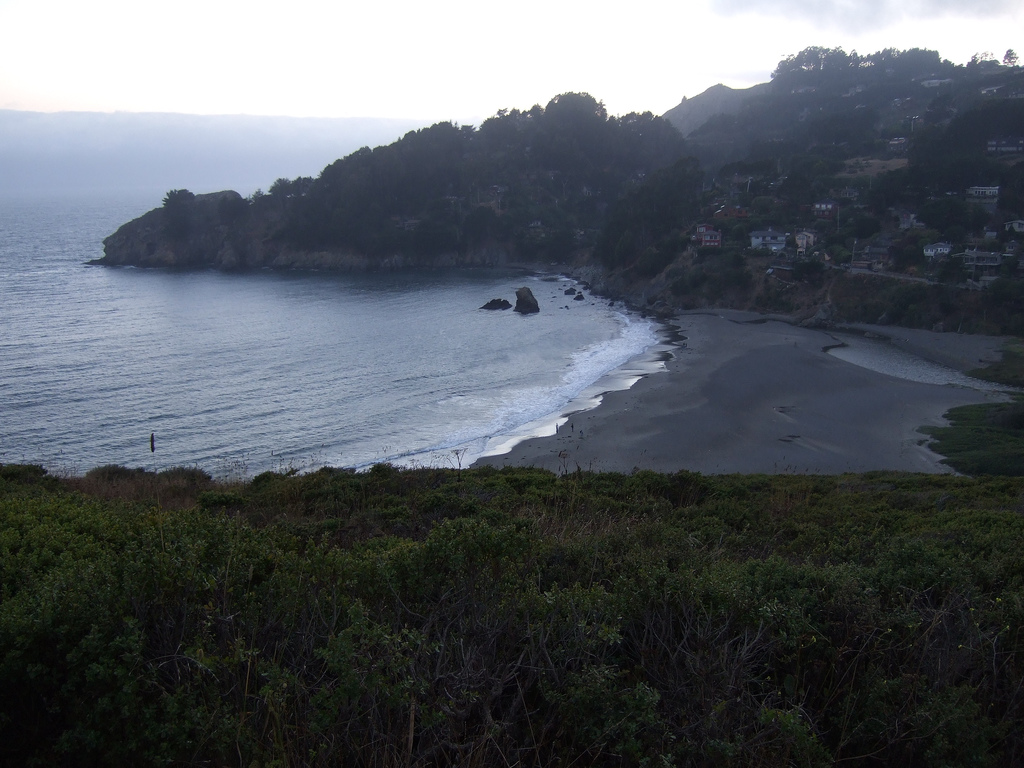
View of Muir Beach

As of 2006, Green Gulch Farm plans to team up with the National Park Service to help restore Muir Beach to its original beauty. They will apparently remove the parking lot area—which was originally wetlands—in order to restore the area to its original condition.

== Resident teachers ==
=== Current ===
- Jiryu Rutschman-Byler, abiding Abbot
- Thiemo Blank, Tanto (head of practice)
- Chosetsu Lauren Bouyea
- Jokai Carolyn Cavanaugh
- Sessei Meg Levie
- Zenju Earthlyn Manuel Osho
- Ango Sara Tashker

=== Other teachers in the Green Gulch and SFZC community ===
- Furyu Nancy Schroeder
- Emila Heller
- Sukey Parmelee
- Sonja Gardenswartz
- Mick Sopko
- Steve Weintraub
- Meiya Wender, Godo
- Wendy Johnson - non-resident gardener emeritus

== See also ==
- Buddhism in the United States
- Tassajara Zen Mountain Center
- Timeline of Zen Buddhism in the United States
- Spiritual ecology
