= Tassajara Zen Mountain Center =

Sōtō Zen Buddhist monastery in the United States

Coordinates: 36.2335°N 121.5503°W

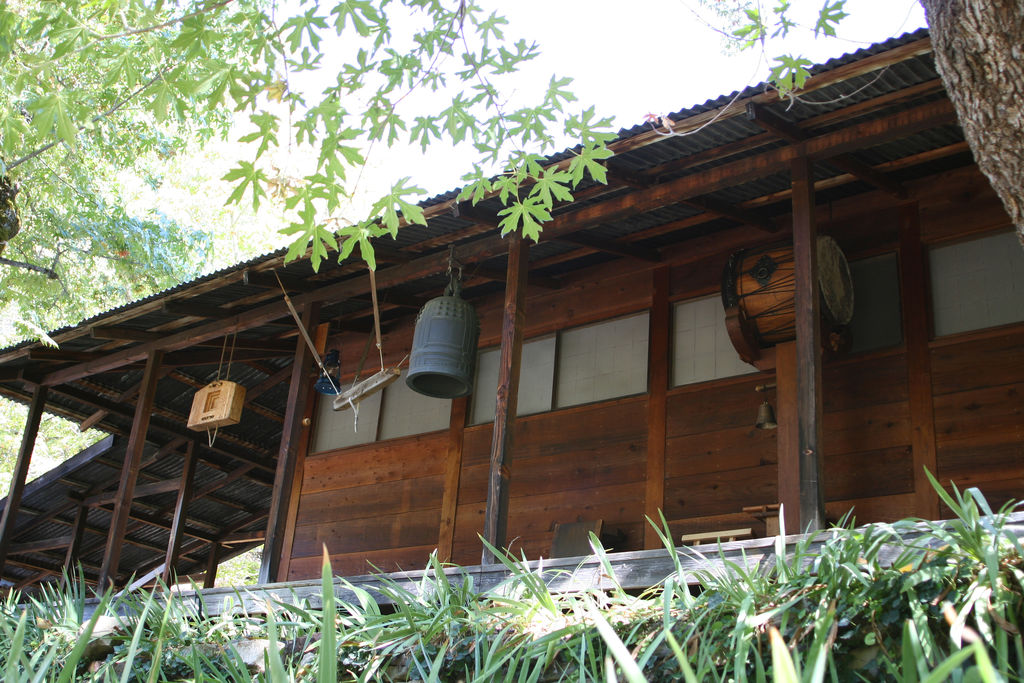
- Zendo at Tassajara

Religion
- Affiliation: Buddhism
- Sect: Soto Zen

Location
- Location: 39171 Tassajara Road Carmel Valley, CA 93924
- Country: United States
- Interactive map of Tassajara Zen Mountain Center

Architecture
- Founder: Shunryu Suzuki
- Completed: 1967

Website
- http://sfzc.org/tassajara/

The Tassajara Zen Mountain Center is the oldest Japanese Buddhist Sōtō Zen monastery in the United States. It is on the border of the Ventana Wilderness and within the Los Padres National Forest, southeast of Carmel-by-the-Sea, California. The center is only accessible over 5,082-foot-high (1,549 m) Chews Ridge via a narrow, steep, 13.7-mile (22.0 km) one-lane dirt road from Jamesburg. During the winter months the center can be inaccessible due to snow and rain. Practitioners live and study on site. From Memorial Day to Labor Day, the center is open to day and overnight guests. The natural hot springs have been developed into Japanese-style baths. A steam bath is built over a hot spring in Tassajara Creek. The center is the first Zen monastery established outside Asia.

== History ==
The name is a corruption of Tasajera, a Spanish-American word derived from an indigenous Esselen word, which means "place where meat is hung to dry".

The 126-acre mountain property surrounding the Tassajara Hot Springs was purchased by the San Francisco Zen Center in 1967 for the below-market price of $300,000 from Robert and Anna Beck. They improved the property and renamed it The Tassajara Zen Mountain Center, or Zenshinji (Zen Mind Temple), during Shunryu Suzuki's tenure as its first abbot. When it was purchased in 1967, it was the first Zen monastery outside Asia.

Tassajara's remote location in the Coastal Range means it is often threatened by wildfires. In 2008 the Basin Complex Fire reached the monastery; five monks stayed in spite of evacuation orders and successfully protected it from the fire, after which the San Francisco Zen Center organized a trained group of firefighters to defend its three monasteries, known as "fire monks" after a book about the 2008 events. An external sprinkler system was also installed on buildings, called "dharma rain". The Tassajara Center was threatened by the 2016 Soberanes Fire; it escaped damage but was closed to guests for the remainder of the year. In June 2021, the Willow Fire threatened the monastery.

In March 2026, a meditation center and items inside including a historic Buddha statue were destroyed in a late-night fire; residents started the sprinkler system and contained the fire with water hauled from the creek in buckets until firefighters arrived. A suspect has been charged with arson in connection with the fire.

== Calendars and schedules ==
=== Practice periods ===
A practice period (ango in Japanese) denotes a period of intensive monastic practice. During the fall (September–December) and spring (January–April) practice periods, Tassajara is closed to the public. The rigorous schedule is a defining feature. Activity revolves around zazen (meditation), study, and work.

=== Guest season ===
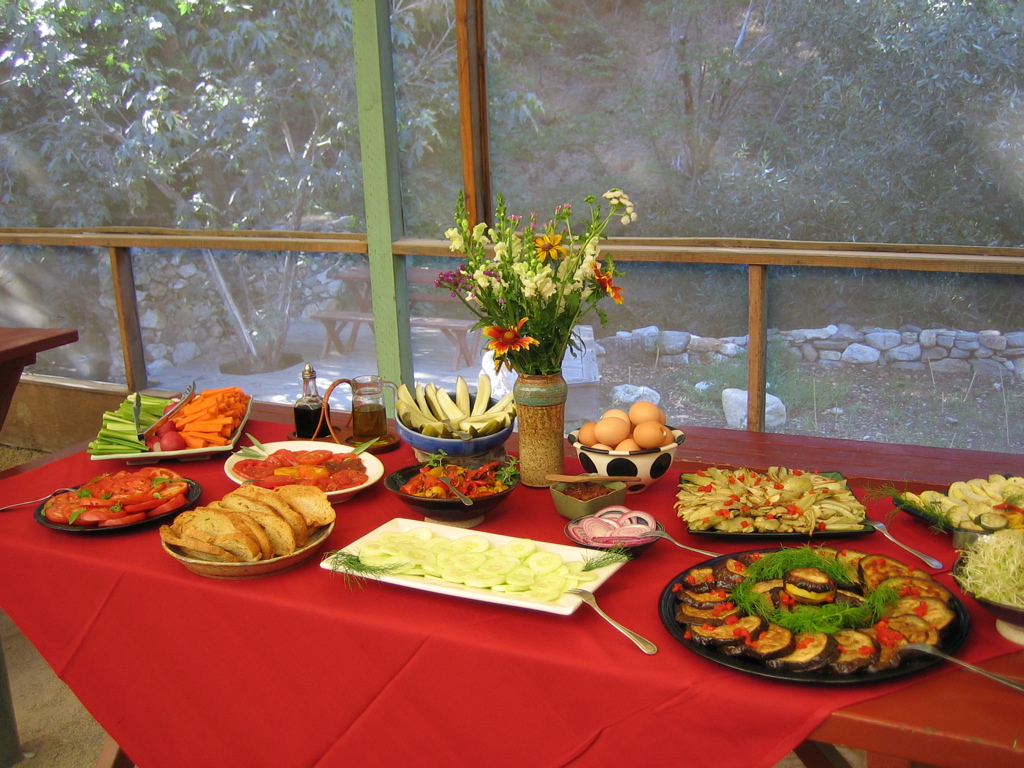
Lunch buffet at the Center

After the practice periods, Tassajara is open to the public from mid-April through early September. For students, this period also allows them to earn credits toward the fall and spring practice periods. The guest season, with less rigorous daily schedules, is a cornerstone of Tassajara's economic well-being.

The guest program includes a major kitchen operation. Tassajara is renowned for its vegetarian cuisine. Tassajara personnel also founded the Tassajara Bakery in Ashbury Heights and Greens Restaurant at Fort Mason in the Marina District in San Francisco. Edward Espe Brown's Tassajara Bread Book, published by Shambhala Publications in 1970 and revised in 1986 and 1995, is often credited as a major catalyst for the popularity of artisanal baking in the United States, while his Tassajara Recipe Book is the best known of several books of general vegetarian cuisine produced by authors connected with the center.

== Gallery ==
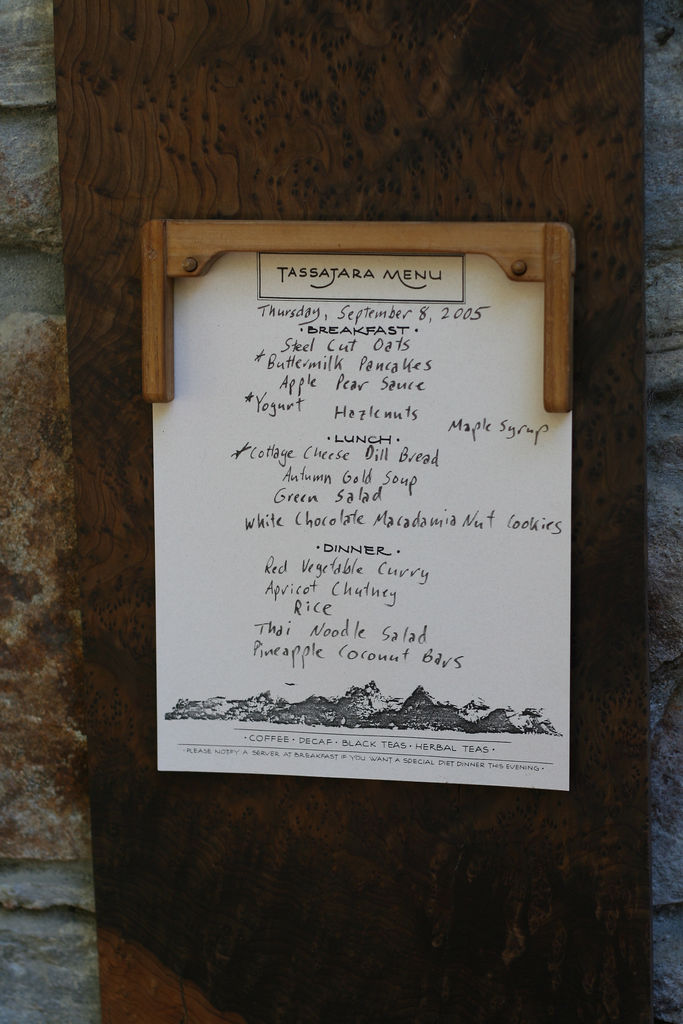

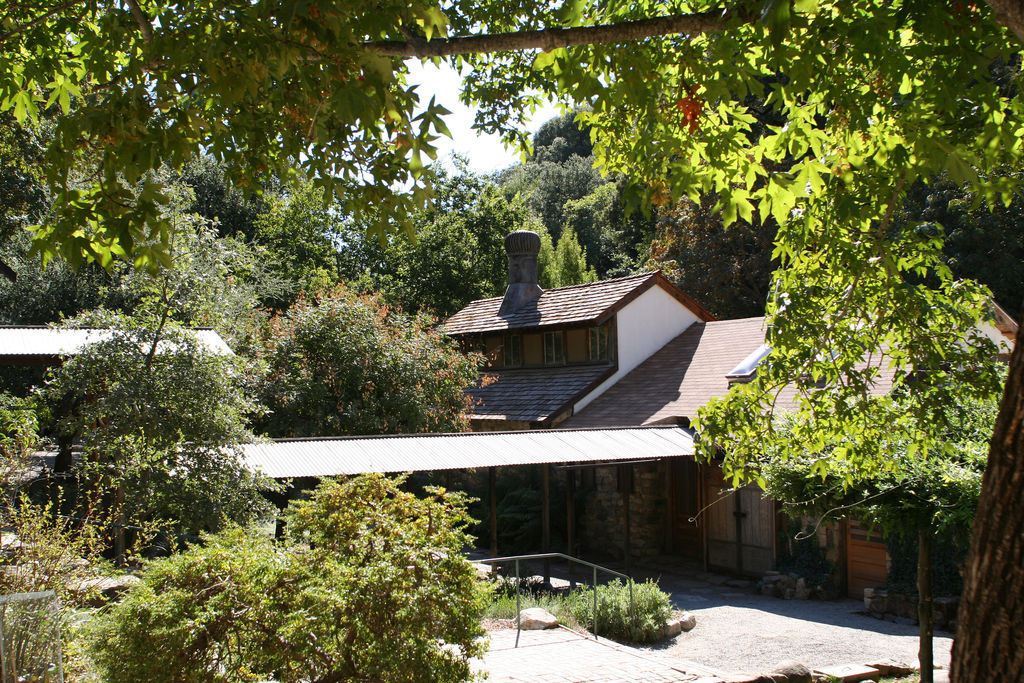

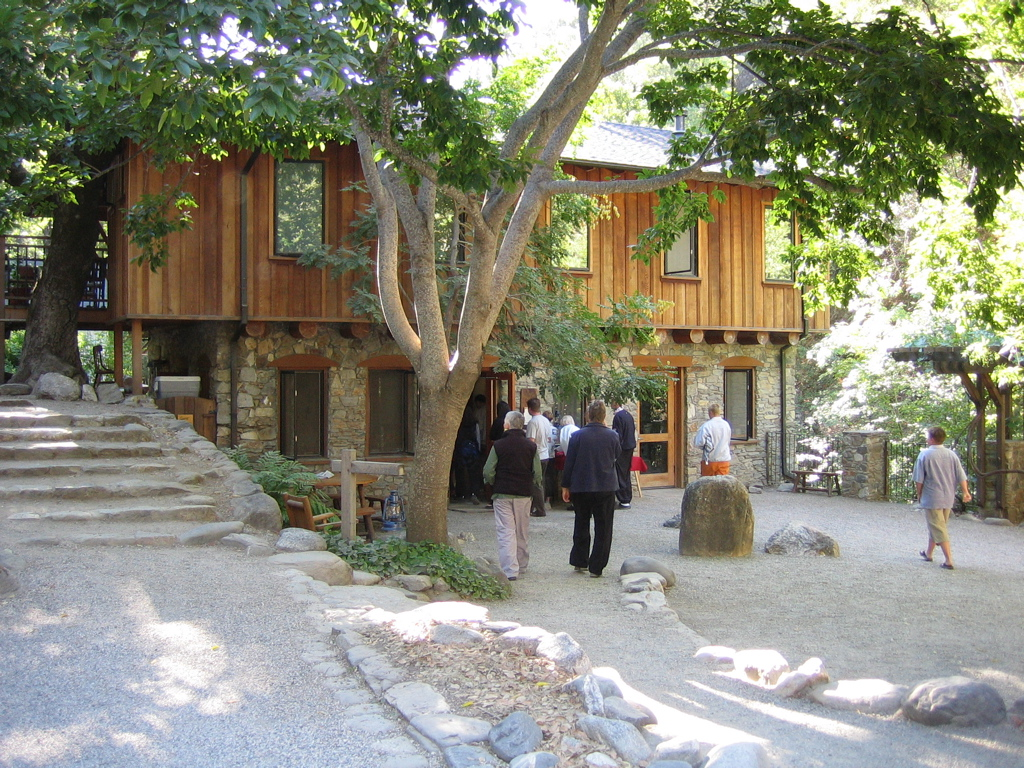

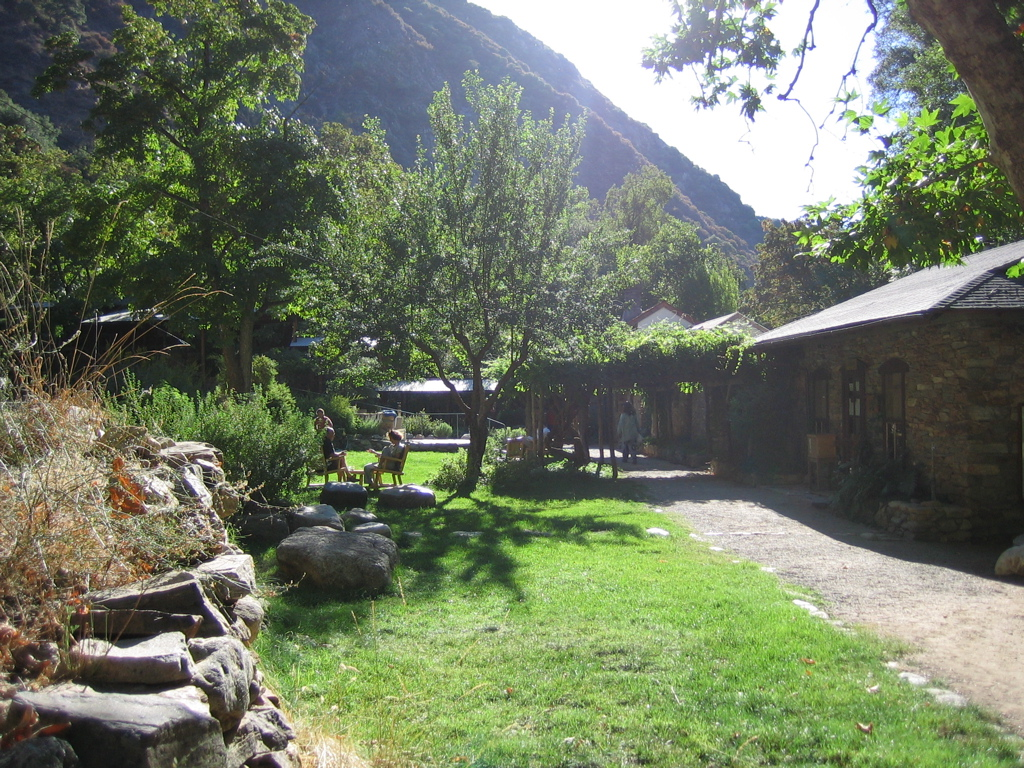

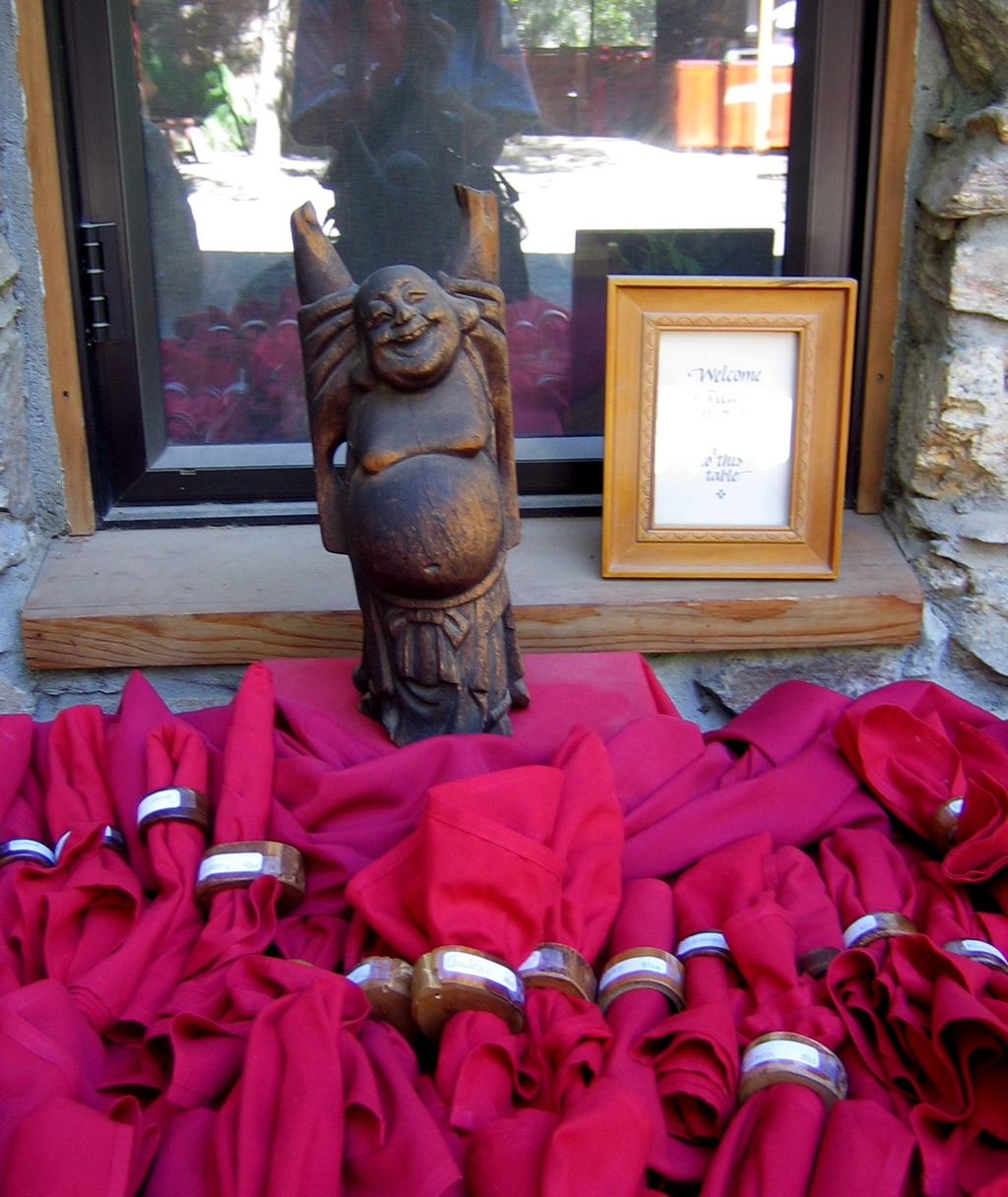

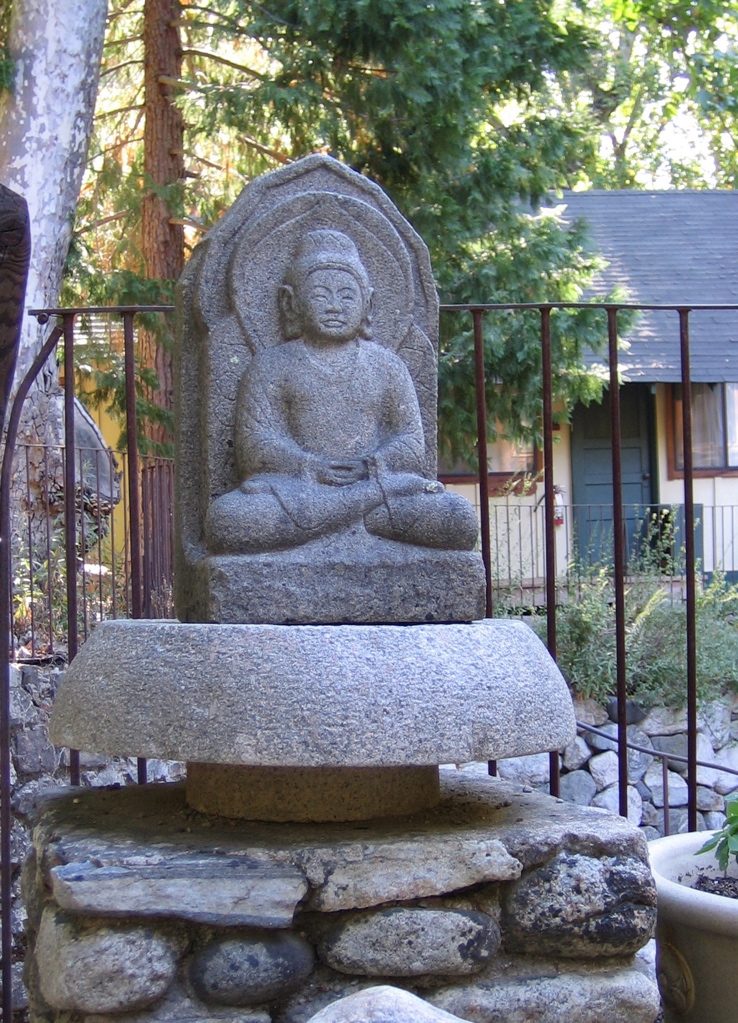

== See also ==
- American Zen Teachers Association
- Soto Zen Buddhist Association
- Retreat (spiritual)
- Timeline of Zen Buddhism in the United States
- Glossary of Japanese Buddhism
