= Zendō =

Japanese meditation hall

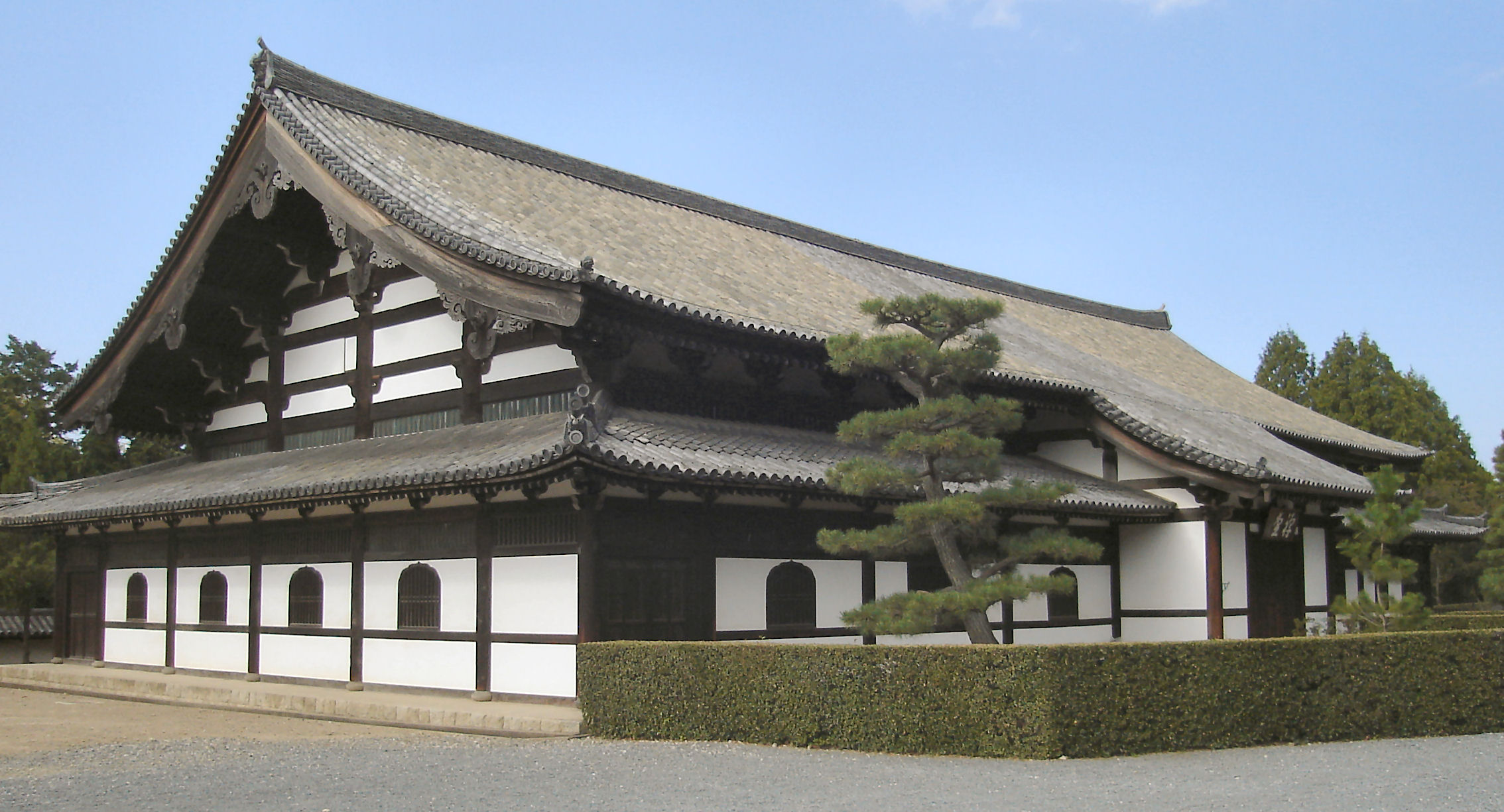
Zendō of Tōfuku-ji, Kyoto

Zendō (禅堂) (Chinese: Chántáng) or senbutsu-jō (選仏場) is a Japanese meditation hall. In Zen Buddhism, the zen-dō is a spiritual dōjō where zazen (sitting meditation) is practiced. A full-sized Zen Buddhist temple will typically have at least one zen-dō as well as a hon-dō ("main hall", but sometimes translated as "Buddha hall"), which is used for ceremonial purposes, plus a variety of other buildings with different functions. However, any place where people go to practice Zen can be referred to as a zen-dō.

== Mealtimes ==
In some temples, meals are eaten in the zendo during sesshin. Three meals a day are served. Breakfast is served in the early morning, before dawn. It normally consists of rice gruel and pickled vegetables. Two meals are taken later; at noon and late afternoon. The noon meal is the main meal. These meals usually consist of rice, vegetable soup and pickled vegetables. The afternoon meal consists of leftovers from the noon meal. The Heart or Hridaya Sūtra and the "five meditations" are recited before breakfast and lunch. During lunch monks will offer some of their meal to the pretas or hungry ghosts. The monks remain silent during mealtimes and communicate via hand and arm gestures.
