= Harada-Yasutani School =

Lay-oriented Japanese Zen lineage combining Sōtō and Rinzai practices

Harada–Yasutani School of Zen Buddhism (原田–安谷系 (Harada–Yasutani kei)) is a twentieth-century current of Japanese Zen that integrates the silent-illumination practice of the Sōtō school with the complete Rinzai kōan curriculum and extends that synthesis to lay practitioners worldwide.

The Harada-Yasutani lineage is distinct in Japanese Zen history because it deliberately fuses the two major Zen schools, Soto and Rinzai, into a single teaching stream and then re-exports that hybrid to lay practitioners around the world. Its first holder, Harada Daiun Sogaku (1871-1961), received full dharma transmission in Sōtō Zen from Harada Sōdō and, unusually, a second transmission in the Rinzai line from Dokutan Sōsan, so that in the lineage documents he appears both as the 31st Sōtō ancestor after Dōgen and the 8th Rinzai ancestor after Hakuin. His heir Haku'un Yasutani (1885-1973) then formalised this “dual-inheritance” as an independent stream, today called Harada-Yasutani or Sanbō-Kyōdan, whose subsequent teachers (Yamada Kōun, et al.) continued to present Sōtō shikantaza together with the full Rinzai kōan curriculum to monks and, for the first time, large numbers of lay men and women, Japanese and foreign alike.

== History ==
=== Harada Daiun Sōgaku ===
Harada Daiun Sōgaku (1871–1961) was ordained in the Sōtō school but completed kōan training under the Rinzai master Dokutan Sōsan, receiving teaching authority while remaining administratively in Sōtō.His temple, Hōsshinji, revived kōan work for Sōtō clergy and laity in the 1920s.

=== Foundation of Sanbō Kyōdan (1954) ===
Harada’s disciple Haku’un Yasutani (1885–1973) completed the kōan course in 1953 and, dissatisfied with sectarian bureaucracy, resigned his Sōtō posts to found the lay association Sanbō Kyōdan (三宝教団, “Fellowship of the Three Treasures”) on 8 January 1954 in Kamakura.

=== Post-war growth ===
Yasutani began overseas teaching tours in 1962; his collaboration with Philip Kapleau on The Three Pillars of Zen (1965) disseminated sesshin manuals and verbatim dokusan notes to English-language readers. On Yasutani’s retirement in 1970 he appointed Yamada Kōun (1907–1989) as Kanchō (abbot), who expanded the network to Europe and the Americas. In 2014 the organisation adopted the English name Sanbō-Zen International.

== Doctrine and practice ==
- Dual method – Training opens with the mu kōan and may alternates kōan introspection with shikantaza. Students who elect kōan practice work through the miscellaneous kōans, Mumonkan, Blue Cliff Record, Book of Equanimity, Shōyōroku, and over 100 precept kōans.
- Lay accessibility – Sesshin typically last five to seven days and are open equally to ordained and lay practitioners; many Dharma heirs are married householders.
- Emphasis on kenshō – Initial awakening is treated as indispensable for further cultivation, a stance Yasutani framed as corrective to what he viewed as ritualism in contemporary Sōtō.

== Influence ==
Despite modest membership (3 790 adherents reported in 1988), scholars identify the stream as a major conduit for Zen’s globalisation. Lineages deriving from Harada–Yasutani include the Rochester Zen Center, Maria Kannon Zen Center, Diamond Sangha, White Plum Asanga, and Pacific Zen Institute.

== Notable dharma heirs ==
- Harada Daiun Sōgaku → Yasutani Haku’un → Yamada Kōun → Kubota Jiun / Yamada Ryōun (Sanbō-Zen International)
- Independent heirs: Philip Kapleau, Robert Aitken, Taizan Maezumi, Ruben Habito, Willigis Jäger, John Tarrant

== See also ==
- Sanbō-Zen International
- Zen in the United States
- White Plum Asanga
