= Anne Hopkins Aitken =

American Zen Buddhist

Anne Arundel Hopkins Aitken
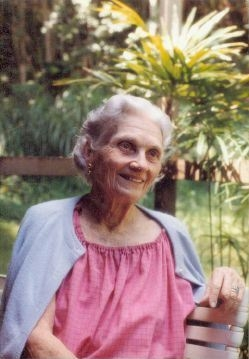

Personal life
- Born: Anna Stinchfield Hopkins; February 8, 1911 Cook County, Illinois, US
- Died: June 13, 1994 (aged 83) Honolulu, Hawaii, US
- Spouse: Robert Baker Aitken
- Children: 1
- Education: Oxford University; Scripps College; Stanford University; Northwestern University
- Website: anne.robertaitken.net

Religious life
- Religion: Buddhism
- School: Zen Buddhism

Senior posting
- Teacher: Soen Nakagawa; Hakuun Yasutani; Yamada Koun
- Based in: Diamond Sangha

Anne Arundel Hopkins Aitken (February 8, 1911 – June 13, 1994) was an American Zen Buddhist in the Harada-Yasutani lineage. She co-founded the Honolulu Diamond Sangha in 1959 together with her husband, Robert Baker Aitken. She purchased both of its properties: the Koko An Zendo and Maui Zendo. Honolulu Diamond Sangha has been considered "one of several pivotal Buddhist organizations critical to the development of Zen" in western countries. Anne Aitken was also one of the original founders of the Buddhist Peace Fellowship.

== Early life ==
Anne Hopkins was born on February 8, 1911, to in Cook County, Illinois. Her mother, Marian Stinchfield Hopkins, was born in Detroit, Michigan, and was 25 when Anne was born. Her father, Lambert Arundel Hopkins, born in New Mexico, was a 29-year-old "railroad supply man" when she was born.

Named Anna Stinchfield Hopkins on her birth certificate, No.6407, Hopkins told her husband, Robert Baker Aitken, that her name was later changed (when she was old enough to remember the event, perhaps six to eight years-old) because Stinchfield did not provide positive numerology readings.

== Education ==
Hopkins spent the years 1929 to 1931 studying abroad as an undergraduate at Oxford University and graduated from Scripps College in Claremont, California, with a B.A. in English in 1932. She then pursued a master's degree in sociology, first at Stanford University in 1933, and later at Northwestern University (1940–1942). In addition to her Oxford years, she also lived in England from January to June, 1937. She traveled to Sweden, Finland, France, Germany, Spain, Japan, Italy, Mexico, and much of South America Among other experiences, she had worked in a settlement house in Chicago. During World War II, she worked in a Red Cross hospital.

In 1949, Hopkins became a teacher and assistant director at Happy Valley School. There she met, hired, and in 1957 married, English language teacher Robert Aitken.

== Zen Buddhism ==
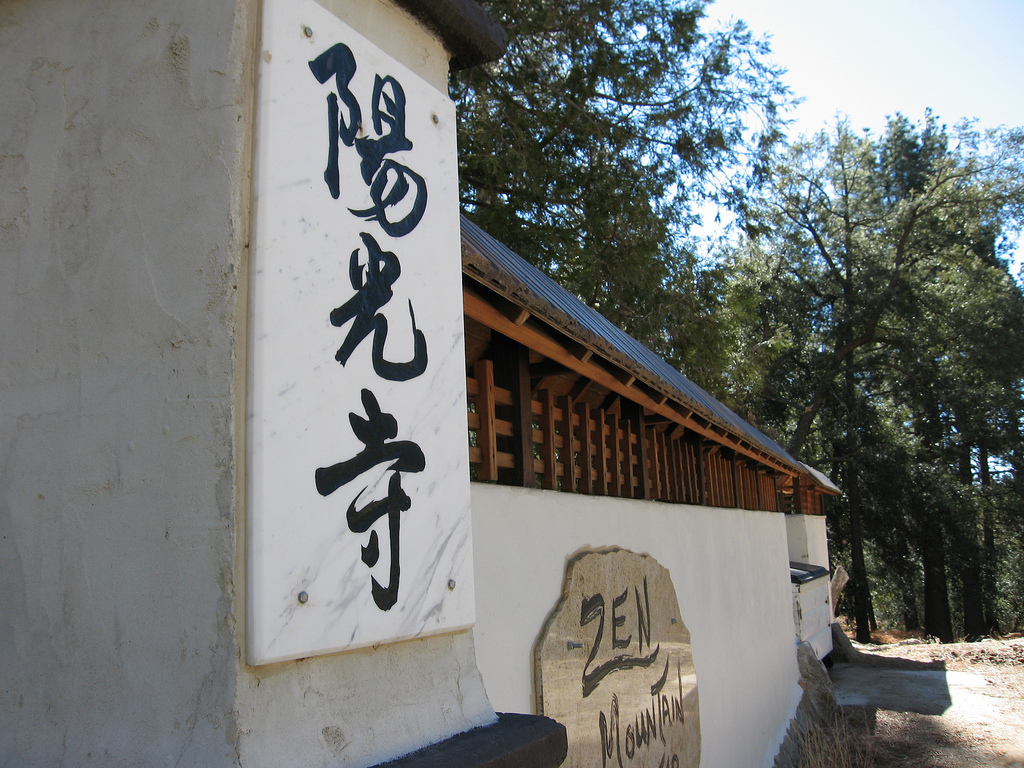
Zen Buddhism

Her new husband introduced her to Zen Buddhism, and her long relationship with the Buddhist community began with their honeymoon to Ryutakuji in Japan. She went on to study the Dharma with Haku'un Yasutani, Sōen Nakagawa and Koun Yamada. She was given the Japanese Buddhist name An (Peace, peace of being at home) Tanshin (Single mind). She and her husband moved to Honolulu, Hawaiʻi, to be closer to her young stepson, Thomas L. Aitken.

There they established the Koko An Zendo, which led to the establishment of the Diamond Sangha, an international Zen Buddhist society, in 1959. A second site, Maui Zendo in Haiku, Maui, was established by the Aitkens in 1969. Both Koko An Zendo and Maui Zendo were purchased by Anne Aitken, using money from an inheritance.

Her essay In Spite of Myself chronicled some of her early experiences, and the discouragement and disillusion that she experienced during the twelve years of practice that led to her realization of kensho. Many of the changes that emphasized the full equality of women and made Zen practice and leadership more accessible to women can be attributed to her work within the Diamond Sangha. She was neither a prolific writer nor a frequent speaker, but she is remembered fondly around the world for her dedication to the Dharma and support for the Sangha. People recall how she touched them individually and made each one feel as if they were special to her.

Aitken was living at the teacher's quarters of the Honolulu Diamond Sangha in Pālolo, Hawaiʻi, when she became ill, displaying symptoms similar to the flu. Two days later, on June 13, 1994, at the age of 83, she died of a coronary heart attack, with her husband, stepson, and some close friends at her hospital bedside.

== Gallery ==
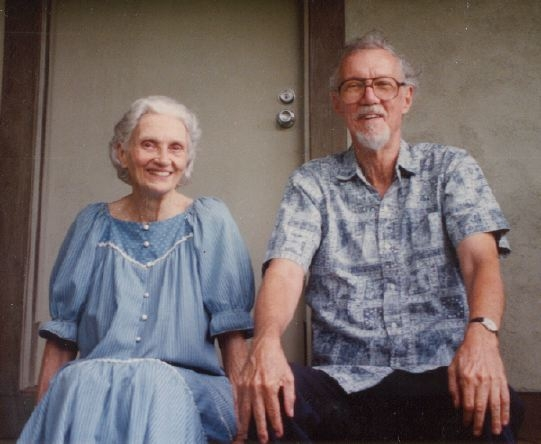

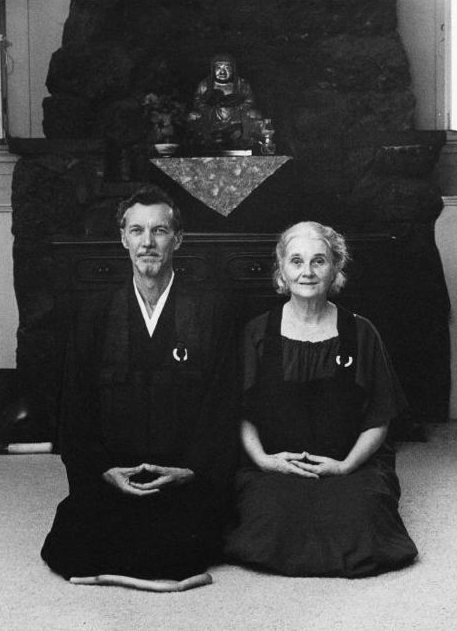

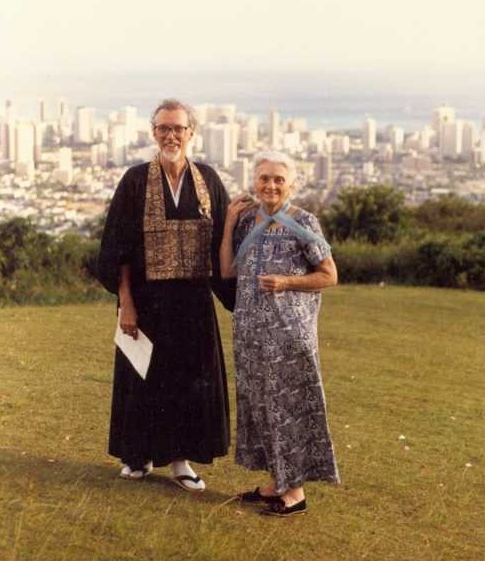

== Suggested readings ==
- Aitken, Anne (1979). "In Spite of Myself". Kahawai. 1 (2 Spring): 2–9. Reprinted in Blind Donkey. 15 (1 Spring, 1995): 5-7, 12.
- Aitken, Robert.1982. "Willy-Nilly Zen." pp. 115–132. In: Aitken, Robert (1982). Taking the path of Zen. San Francisco: North Point Press.
- Tworkov, Helen (1989). Zen in America : profiles of five teachers : Robert Aitken, Jakusho Kwong, Bernard Glassman, Maurine Stuart, Richard Baker. San Francisco: North Point Press. pp. 23-62. ISBN 978-0-86547-354-6.

== See also ==
- Timeline of Zen Buddhism in the United States
