= Zen at War =

1997 book by Brian Daizen Victoria

Zen At War
- Cover of the second edition
- Author: Brian Victoria
- Language: English
- Subject: Zen and History of Japan
- Publisher: Lanham, Md.: Rowman & Littlefield Publishers
- Publication date: 2006 (2nd Ed.)
- Publication place: United States
- Media type: Print (Hardcover)
- ISBN: 0-7425-3927-X
- OCLC: 66463758
- Dewey Decimal: 294.3/927095209034 22
- LC Class: BQ9262.9.J3 V54 2006

Zen at War is a book written by Brian Daizen Victoria, first published in 1997. The second edition appeared in 2006.

== Contents ==
The book meticulously documents Zen Buddhism's support of Japanese militarism from the time of the Meiji Restoration through the World War II and the post-War period. It describes the influence of state policy on Buddhism in Japan, and particularly the influence of Zen on the military of the Empire of Japan. A famous quote is from Harada Daiun Sogaku: "[If ordered to] march: tramp, tramp, or shoot: bang, bang. This is the manifestation of the highest Wisdom [of Enlightenment]. The unity of Zen and war of which I speak extends to the farthest reaches of the holy war [now under way]."

The book also explores the actions of Japanese Buddhists who opposed the growth of militarism.

The 2006 edition of Zen at War was followed by Zen War Stories, which further explores the intimate relationship between Japanese institutional Buddhism and militarism during World War II.

== Sources ==
Victoria draws from his own study of original Japanese documents, but also uses the publications of Ichikawa Hakugen, a Rinzai-priest and a scholar who taught at Hanazono University in Tokyo. Hakugen's work, in Japanese, include:

- 1967 Zen and Contemporary Thought (Zen to Gendai Shiso)
- 1970 The War Responsibility of Buddhists (Bukkyosha no Senso Sekinin)
- 1975 Religion Under Japanese Fascism (Nihon Fashizumu Ka no Shukyo)
- 1977 Buddhism During the War (Senji Ka no Bukkyo)

Hakugen himself had been "a strong advocate of Japan's 'holy war'": "And I should not forget to include myself as one of those modern Japanese Buddhist who did these things. "

Hakugen points to twelve characteristics of Japanese Zen which have contributed to its support for Japanese militarism:

1. Subservience of Buddhism to the state.
2. Buddhist views on humanity and society. Though "Buddhism emphasizes the equality of human beings based on their possession of a Buddha nature"; the doctrine of karma has also been used as a "moral justification for social inequality".
3. Protection of the state and the hierarchical social structures.
4. Emphasis on śūnyatā and selflessness, "leaving no room for the independence of the individual".
5. Lack of Buddhist dogma, which left no "compelling basic dogma a believer would fight to preserve". (Note: See Karl Barth's Barmen Declaration for an example of such a "dogma to fight for".)
6. The concept of on, "the teaching that a debt of gratitude is owed to those from whom favors are received". In the case of Japanese Zen, this gratitude was also owed to the Emperor, as "the head of the entire Japanese family".
7. The belief in mutual dependency, which "led in modern Japan to an organic view of the state coupled with a feeling of intimacy towards it".
8. The doctrine of the Middle Way, which "took the form of a constant search for compromise with the aim of avoiding confrontation before it occurred".
9. The tradition of ancestor veneration, in which "the entire nation came to be regarded as one large family in which loyalty between subject and sovereign was the chief virtue".
10. The value given to "old and mature things". Since society was based "on a set of ancient and immutable laws", opposition to this was unacceptable.
11. Emphasis on inner peace, which "contributed to its failure to encourage and justify the will to reorganize society".
12. The Buddhist logic of soku, "just as it is", which leads to "a static, aesthetic perspective, a detached, subjective harmony with things".

Hakugen saw D. T. Suzuki as "most responsible for the development of imperial-way Zen", but in no way standing alone in this development. Hakugen traces this development to pre-meiji developments:

In the Edo period [1600-1867] Zen priests such as Shidō Bunan [1603-1676], Hakuin [1685-1768], and Tōrei [1721-1792] attempted to promote the unity of zen and Shinto by emphasizing Shinto's Zen-like features. While this resulted in the further assimilation of Zen into Japan, it occurred at the same time as the establishment of the power of the emperor system. Ultimately this meant that Zen lost almost all of its independence.

== Responses ==
The book drew a lot of attention, and mixed responses. Professor Kemmyo Taira Sato, Director of Three Wheels Shin Buddhist Temple and former pupil of D. T. Suzuki, wrote :

Few books in recent years have so deeply influenced the thinking of Buddhists in Japan and elsewhere as Brian Daizen Victoria's Zen at War (Victoria 1997). The book's great contribution is that it has succeeded, where others have not, in bringing to public attention the largely unquestioning support of Japanese Buddhists for their nation's militarism in the years following the Meiji Restoration in 1868 (when Japan opened its borders after nearly 250 years of feudal isolation) up until the end of WWII.

Robert Aitken, zen teacher and social activist, wrote :

All of us owe gratitude to Victoria, to James Heisig, and John Maraldo for their book, Rude Awakenings: Zen, the Kyoto School, and the Question of Nationalism, and to the scholars who are publishing a series in Zen Quarterly, the English language journal of the Soto Sect, disclosing the collusion of their sect in Japanese expansionism prior to and during World War II. These scholars help us as Western Zen students to make sense of the barest of hints of wartime involvement which we sensed previously, and to come to grips with the dark side of our heritage.

Ton Lathouwers, Chán-teacher in the Netherlands, in relation to Zen at War mentions Hisamatsu's impossible question, "What will you do when you cannot do anything, when all your best intentions and great endeavour are invested to no avail whatsoever, when all you do is doomed to fail?", relating it to a statement by Takeo Sato:

The question is not so much: What happened exactly and when. The deeper question – an even impossible question if you don't mind me adding already my personal urgency – is: How, in heaven's name, was this possible that human beings could lose to such a degree their true humanity, that they could lose themselves?

== Apologies ==
In response to Zen at War, Ina Buitendijk started a campaign to receive apologies from leading parties within the Japanese Zen-schools:

On 8 January 2000 a letter arrived from a lady who lives in the Netherlands. It reported that her husband, from the age of six until he was nine, was confined in a concentration camp in the Dutch East Indies during World War II by the Japanese army [...] Not only he himself has suffered a great deal, the lady says, but also his distress has had, and still has, a great impact upon his family [...] The main reason the Dutch lady raised the question is that she had read Brian Victoria's book Zen at War and felt herself betrayed by the war-time words and deeds of the founder of the Sanbô Kyôdan Yasutani Haku'un Roshi, who repeatedly praised and promoted the war. Since she herself practices Zen contemplation under Father Johannes Kopp, a Zen teacher of the Sanbô Kyôdan, (Note: Kopp has been ordained as a Zen-teacher by Yamada Koun: Der Pallottinerpater Johannes Kopp S.A.C., geb. 1927, zum Priester geweiht 1963, gehört zur ersten Generation der christlichen Zen-Lehrer. 1985 erlangte er durch Yamada Kôun Roshi in Kamakura, Japan, die Lehrbefähigung. 2006 ernannte ihn Yamada Ryôun Roshi, der Nachfolger von Kôun Roshi, zum Associate Zen-Master des Sanbo-Kyodan von Kamakura. It had never occurred to her that the Zen masters, whom she deeply respected, would ever glorify the waging of war.)

Her campaign resulted in responses from Kubota Ji'un, third abbot of the Sanbo Kyodan, Hirata Seiko, and Hosokawa, abbot of Myoshin-ji.

Kubota Ji'un writes:

If Yasutani Roshi's words and deeds, now disclosed in the book, have deeply shocked anyone who practices in the Zen line of the Sanbô Kyôdan and, consequently, caused him or her to abhor or abandon the practice of Zen, it is a great pity indeed. For the offense caused by these errant words and actions of the past master, I, the present abbot of the Sanbô Kyôdan, cannot but express my heartfelt regret.

Hirata Seiko writes:

In the lineage of Rinzai Zen Buddhism, I am the Dharma-grandchild of Seki Seisatsu, a Zen master singled out for criticism by Brian Victoria. I would like to take this opportunity to express my sincere apologies for those words and those actions of Seisatsu that lent support to the Japanese militaries. Furthermore, I would like, on behalf of the entire Tenryuji-branch of Rinzai Zen Buddhism, to express my heart-felt remorse for the crimes committed by the Japanese military during the Pacific war and for the support given to the militarist regime by members of the Rinzai Zen-clergy.

== Criticism ==
Brian Victoria's book has also been harshly criticized.

Kemmyō Taira Sato states that Victoria's criticism of D. T. Suzuki is misplaced since he did not support Japanese militarism in his writings :

In cases where Suzuki directly expresses his position on the contemporary political situation—whether in his articles, public talks, or letters to friends (in which he would have had no reason to misrepresent his views) – he is clear and explicit in his distrust of and opposition to State Shinto, rightwing thought, and the other forces that were pushing Japan toward militarism and war, even as he expressed interest in decidedly non-rightist ideologies like socialism.

Victoria himself quotes critical remarks by Suzuki on the war and the support given to it by the Zen-institutions: "[T]hey diligently practiced the art of self-preservation through their narrow-minded focus on 'pacifying and preserving the state'."

Muhō Noelke, a German-born Zen monk in the Sōtō Zen tradition, states that Victoria has mistranslated texts from Kōdō Sawaki, who was a prominent Japanese Sōtō Zen teacher in the 20th century.

== Further studies ==
The issues of Japanese nationalism, individualism, and the justification of social inequality have been taken up by other authors as well.

=== Japanese nationalism ===
In 1995, the Nanzan Institute for Religion and Culture published Rude Awakenings. Zen, the Kyoto School, and the question of nationalism, which "examines the relationship between Japanese nationalism and intellectuals in the Kyoto school and the world of Zen." It places the development of the Kyoto school, and its alleged support for the Japanese militarism, in the larger context of the Meiji-restoration.

Robert H. Sharf contributed to this volume, as a sequel to his The Zen of Japanese Nationalism, in which he extensively investigates the support of the Zen-institutions for the Imperial State, and the backgrounds of this support.

Nam-lin Hur has described the support of the Sōtō for the occupation of Korea in the beginning of the 20th century.

=== Individualism ===
Peek argues that individualism, contrary to popular notions, is inherently supported by Buddhism. This inherent support made it possible to effect a transmission from authoritarian imperialism to democracy:

[O]ne of the most significant and most overlooked explanations lies in the fact that the concepts of popular sovereignty and human rights have deep roots in Japanese culture. Specifically, it attempts to demonstrate that Buddhism, as one of the "Three Treasures" of Japanese culture, is inherently antithetical to the authoritarian socio-political structures that have periodically been imposed on the people of Japan.

=== Social inequality ===
The Soto-school has taken up the issue of social inequality. According to Bodiford, the Soto-school has insisted that "the types of social discrimination found in Sõtõ rituals and temple practices" find their origin in "the medieval institutional regulations imposed by the Tokugawa regime, not in the religious attitudes, religious practices, or religious mission of Sõtõ Zen itself". The Soto-school has installed a Human Rights Division, to terminate the regulations which contribute to discriminatory practices.

=== Enlightenment and authority ===
Zen at War has contributed to discussions on the meaning of "enlightenment", and the role of Zen-teachers in the emerging western Zen-Buddhism. Bodhin Kjolhede, dharma heir of Philip Kapleau, says:

Now that we've had the book on Yasutani Roshi opened for us, we are presented with a new koan. Like so many koans, it is painfully baffling: How could an enlightened Zen master have spouted such hatred and prejudice? The nub of this koan, I would suggest, is the word enlightened. If we see enlightenment as an all-or-nothing place of arrival that confers a permanent saintliness on us, then we'll remain stymied by this koan. But in fact there are myriad levels of enlightenment, and all evidence suggests that, short of full enlightenment (and perhaps even with it—who knows?), deeper defilements and habit tendencies remain rooted in the mind.

Stuart Lachs has written several essays on this issue, connected to teacher-scandals in western sanghas. The issue has been taken up by others as well.

== See also ==
- Shinbutsu Bunri
- State Shinto
- Buddhist modernism
- Buddhism and violence

== Works cited ==
- Bodiford, William (1996), "Zen and the Art of Religious Prejudice. Efforts to Reform a Tradition of Social Discrimination" (PDF), Japanese Journal of Religious Studies, 23 (1–2)
- Crook, John (1995), The Place of the Dharma in Our Time
- Crook, John (2000), The Place of Chan in Post-Modern Europe
- Heisig, James W.; Maraldo, John C., eds. (1995), Rude Awakenings. Zen, the Kyoto School, and the question of nationalism (PDF), Honolulu: University of Hawai'i Press, archived from the original (PDF) on August 30, 2012
- Hur, Nam-lin (1999), "The Sõtõ Sect and Japanese Military Imperialism in Korea" (PDF), Japanese Journal of Religious Studies, 26 (1–2)
- Lachs, Stuart (n.d.), Reply to Vladimir K
- Lachs, Stuart (1999), Means of Authorization: Establishing Hierarchy in Ch'an /Zen Buddhism in America
- Lachs, Stuart (2002), Richard Baker and the Myth of the Zen Roshi
- Lachs, Stuart (2006), The Zen Master in America: Dressing the Donkey with Bells and Scarves
- Peek, John M. (1992), Buddhism, Human Rights and the Japanese State
- Sato, Kemmyō Taira (n.d.), D.T. Suzuki and the Question of War (PDF), archived from the original (PDF) on 2014-10-25
- Sharf, Robert H. (August 1993), "The Zen of Japanese Nationalism", History of Religions, 33 (1): 1–43, doi:10.1086/463354
- Sharf, Robert H. (1995), Whose Zen? Zen Nationalism Revisited (PDF)
- Tiltenberg (2002), Zen Without Dirty Hands? Report from a seminar and retreat at De Tiltenberg, Vogelenzang in the Netherlands July 17–22, 2001, Couste Que Couste, ISBN 90-807042-3-7
- Victoria, Brian Daizen (2006), Zen at war (Second ed.), Lanham e.a.: Rowman & Littlefield Publishers
- Yasuaki, Nara (n.d.), The Soto Zen School in Modern Japan

Online

- "Brian Victoria". Oxford Centre for Buddhist Studies. n.d. Archived from the original on 2014-09-29.
- Drayer, Elma (September 8, 2001). "Zenboeddhisme / Verlichte zenmeesters vallen van hun voetstuk". wanadoo.nl. Archived from the original on June 4, 2013.
- Glassman, Roshi Bernie; Shainberg, Lawrence; Aitken, Robert; Kjolhede, Bodhin (Fall 1999). "Yasutani Roshi: The Hardest Koan". Tricycle: The Buddhist Review.
- Kubota Ji'un (n.d.). "Apology for What the Founder of the Sanbo-Kyodan, Haku'un Yasutani Roshi, Said and Did During World War II". Maria Kannon Zen Center. Archived from the original on July 4, 2008.
- "Letter to a friend about Zen practice, family life, Japanese Buddhism and the war about Zen at war". Antaiji: Temple of Peace. January–February 2008. Archived from the original on February 7, 2008.
- "P. Johannes Kopp S.A.C". Leben aus der Mitte: Zen – Kontemplation. n.d.
- "School of Social Sciences: Dr Brian Victoria". 2005. Archived from the original on 2005-06-15.
- "Visiting Research Fellows". International Research Center for Japanese Studies. Archived from the original on 2014-09-29.
