= Brigitte D'Ortschy =

German Buddhist architect

- Title: Roshi

Personal life
- Born: 31 May 1921 Berlin, Germany
- Died: 9 July 1990 (aged 69)
- Other name: Koun-An Doru Chiko

Religious life
- Religion: Zen Buddhism
- School: Sanbo Kyodan
- Lineage: Harada-Yasutani

Senior posting
- Teacher: Haku'un Yasutani
- Predecessor: Koun Yamada

Brigitte D'Ortschy (31 May 1921 – 9 July 1990), or Koun-An Doru Chiko, was an architect, journalist, translator, author, and the first Zen master from Germany in the Sanbo Kyodan school of Japan.

== Biography ==
Brigitte D'Ortschy grew up in Berlin. As a teenager, she became intrigued by the reading of Angelus Silesius, Meister Eckhart, Teresa of Avila and Chuang-tzu. She completed her education by studying architecture and engineering in Berlin and Graz. The sociological and psychological aspects of architecture were one of the main fields of her studies. In 1945 she received her diploma in architecture.

From 1947 to 1950 Brigitte D'Ortschy worked as a research assistant at the Technical University of Munich in the field of building history and archaeology. 1950 she accepted an invitation from the Washington State Department and went to the US to gain experience in urban and regional planning for the rebuilding of postwar Germany. She concluded her graduate studies at the University of North Carolina and worked for the Planning Commission of Philadelphia. During this time she met Frank Lloyd Wright.

In 1951 Brigitte D'Ortschy became a founding member of the Bavarian Committee for Urban and Regional Planning. In 1952 she took the initiative to bring the exhibition "60 years of Living Architecture" on the work of Frank Lloyd Wright to Munich. In 1953 Frank Lloyd Wright invited her to work for him in his architectural atelier in Taliesin West (Arizona). Frank Lloyd Wright's concept of "organic architecture" resonated with Brigitte D’Ortschy. It also sharpened her awareness of physical form as "cultural language" and helped her later to grasp the characteristic features of Japanese culture.

In 1954, on her return to Europe, she became the coordinator of the German section of the international "Triennale" exhibition in Milano. In the following years, she organized exhibitions in Helsingborg (Sweden), Milano, Israel, Berlin and Munich. In addition, she did design work, gave lectures, and wrote articles for the trade press.

In 1960 she travelled to Israel to prepare the first exhibition about the Art and Craft of Israel in postwar Germany, setting it up in Munich and Berlin. Besides her professional life, she engaged in intense discussions and exchange of letters with leading thinkers of her time on the many aspects of science and religious philosophy. During these years she read the book Zen and the Art of Archery by Eugen Herrigel. "This book about Zen....awakened in me the feeling that Japan was holding sth. extremely important for me" she later writes. Up to 1963, she worked both as a freelance architect and for the Bavaria Film Company while continuing to publish articles and a series of books about architectural design. In 1963 she decided to move to Japan.

=== Zen-training and teaching ===
Shortly after her arrival in Japan Brigitte D'Ortschy met Zen-Master Ryoko Roshi (1885–1973) and in April 1964 she began her rigorous Zen-training under him in the Fukusho-ji in Tokyo and in the Mokuso-in in Kamakura. She earned a living as a lecturer at the Waseda, Yokohama and Tokyo universities, and being an articulate writer, she wrote many articles about traditional Japanese culture and its Zen schools of art. Brigitte D'Ortschy underwent the entire Koan-training which she completed in 1972 when she received Inka Shomei. Yasutani Haku'un Roshi bestowed on her the Dharma name Doru Chiko Daishi and she became his Dharma heir. In 1973 Yamada Koun Ken Enko Zenshin Roshi (1907–1989) held the Hasan-Sai ceremony for her and she inherited his Dharma too. Yamada Koun gave her the name Koun An Roshi. From then on she was called Koun An Doru Chiko Roshi (=Daishi). In 1983 Yamada Roshi confirmed her as an authentic Zen Master in her own right (Shoshike) of the Sanbo Kyodan lineage. Koun An Doru Chiko Roshi is the 85th generation after Shakyamuni Buddha and the 35th generation after Dogen Zenji.

In the San'un zendo in Kamakura, she befriended her Zen companion Philip Kapleau who was then writing his zen classic The Three Pillars of Zen. She designed the cover of this book and translated it into German. Those parts of Phillip Kapleau's book which were originally written in Kanbun she translated anew into English to keep her German translation as faithful as possible. The German edition (Die Drei Pfeiler des Zen) was eventually published in 1969. During these years Hugo Makibi Enomiya Lassalle SJ became her Zen companion, as well as the Californian Jesuit Father Thomas Hand, one of the first Catholic priests in the San'un zendo and pioneer of the Christian/Buddhist dialogue. Her long friendship with Father Hand is documented in an exchange of letters spanning 20 years.

From 1973 onwards, together with Yamada Koun Roshi she held the first Sesshin in Germany. In 1975 she established her own zendo in Munich. This zendo grew into a community of zen disciples from all over the world. Koun An pursued her teaching during intense summer training periods. During winter time she continued her zen training in Japan and kept working on her translations and writings. She shielded her Munich zendo and her students from the public limelight in order to guarantee an intense and authentic zen-training and did so in line with her view that "spiritual training is always for free".

Under the pseudonym of Michael Mueller, Brigitte D'Ortschy published a teisho (dharma talk) about the koan "MU". With the title ZEN (photos by Eberhard Grames) it was published in 1984 for the first time.

Until her death in 1990 she spent the winter months in her garden hut (Jap. hanare) in Kita-Kamakura, Yama-no-uchi, and continued her own Zen training. With the support of Yamada Koun Roshi in the San'un Zendo in Kamakura she translated the classic texts of Zen-Buddhism from the Chinese and Japanese originals into English and/or German: "Hui-Neng" (Eno) (638-713) The Dharma-Treasure Rostrum Sutra of the Great Master, the Sixth Patriarch, "Sosan no hanashi", and complete classic koan collections, like Mumon Ekai: Mumon-kan (The Gateless Gate), Setcho/Engo: Hekigan Roku (The Blue Cliff Record), Keizan Jokin: Denko-Roku (Transmission of Light), Wanshi Shogaku: Shoyu Roku (The Book of Equanimity), etc. and wrote her own teisho (Dharma talks) about all of the respective koan. Her contribution in the context of Christian/Buddhist dialogue is most comprehensively documented in her exchange of letters over 15 years with a Carthusian monk who was her disciple.

While Yasutani Haku'un Roshi is regarded as the pioneer of Zen in the US, Koun-An Doru Chiko Roshi is regarded as the first German Zen Master with students from all over the world.

== Bibliography ==
Books with Audio-CD (German)

- Mumon Kan (Wu-men-kuan) Mumon Ekai (1183–1260). 1-48. (2001) ISBN 3-935241-00-3 (Translation from Chinese and Japanese)
- Mumon Kan. Teisho 1–4. (2001) ISBN 3-935241-02-X
- Mumon Kan. Teisho 5–8. (2001) ISBN 3-935241-03-8
- Mumon Kan. Teisho 9–12. (2002) ISBN 3-935241-31-3
- Hekigan-Roku (Pi-yen-lu). Master Setcho (980-1052) and Master Engo (1063–1135).
- 1-100. (2001) ISBN 3-935241-01-1 (Translation from Chinese and Japanese)
- Hekigan-Roku. Teisho 1–4.(2001) ISBN 3-935241-04-6
- Hekigan-Roku. Teisho 5–8.(2001) ISBN 3-935241-05-4
- Hekigan-Roku. Teisho 9–12. (2002) ISBN 3-935241-30-5
- Hekigan-Roku. Teisho 3,4,5,90,91.(2005) ISBN 3-935241-43-7
- Der Abendliche Spruch. 3 Teisho. (2002) ISBN 3-935241-09-7

MP3 CDs (German)

- Mumon Kan Mumon Ekai. 1-48. Translation (2008) ISBN 3-935241-60-7
- Mumon Kan. Teisho 1-48. (2003) ISBN 3-935241-59-3
- Mumon Kan. Teisho 1–12. (2004) ISBN 3-935241-50-X
- Mumon Kan. Teisho 13–30. (2003) ISBN 3-935241-48-8
- Mumon Kan. Teisho 31–48. (2004) ISBN 3-935241-49-6)
- Hekigan-Roku. Teisho 1-54. (2003) ISBN 3-935241-54-2
- Hekigan-Roku. Teisho 55–100. (2003) ISBN 3-935241-55-0
- Hekigan-Roku. Teisho 1–12. (2004) ISBN 3-935241-51-8
- Hekigan-Roku. Teisho 1-54 (2008) ISBN 3-935241-54-2
- Hekigan-Roku. Teisho 55–68. (2003) ISBN 3-935241-39-9
- Hekigan-Roku. Teisho 69–82. (2004) ISBN 3-935241-40-2
- Hekigan-Roku. Teisho 83–93. (2004) ISBN 3-935241-41-0

DVD

- Hekigan-Roku. Teisho 3,4,5,90,91. (2005) ISBN 3-935241-26-7 Electronic publication (English)

== Gallery ==

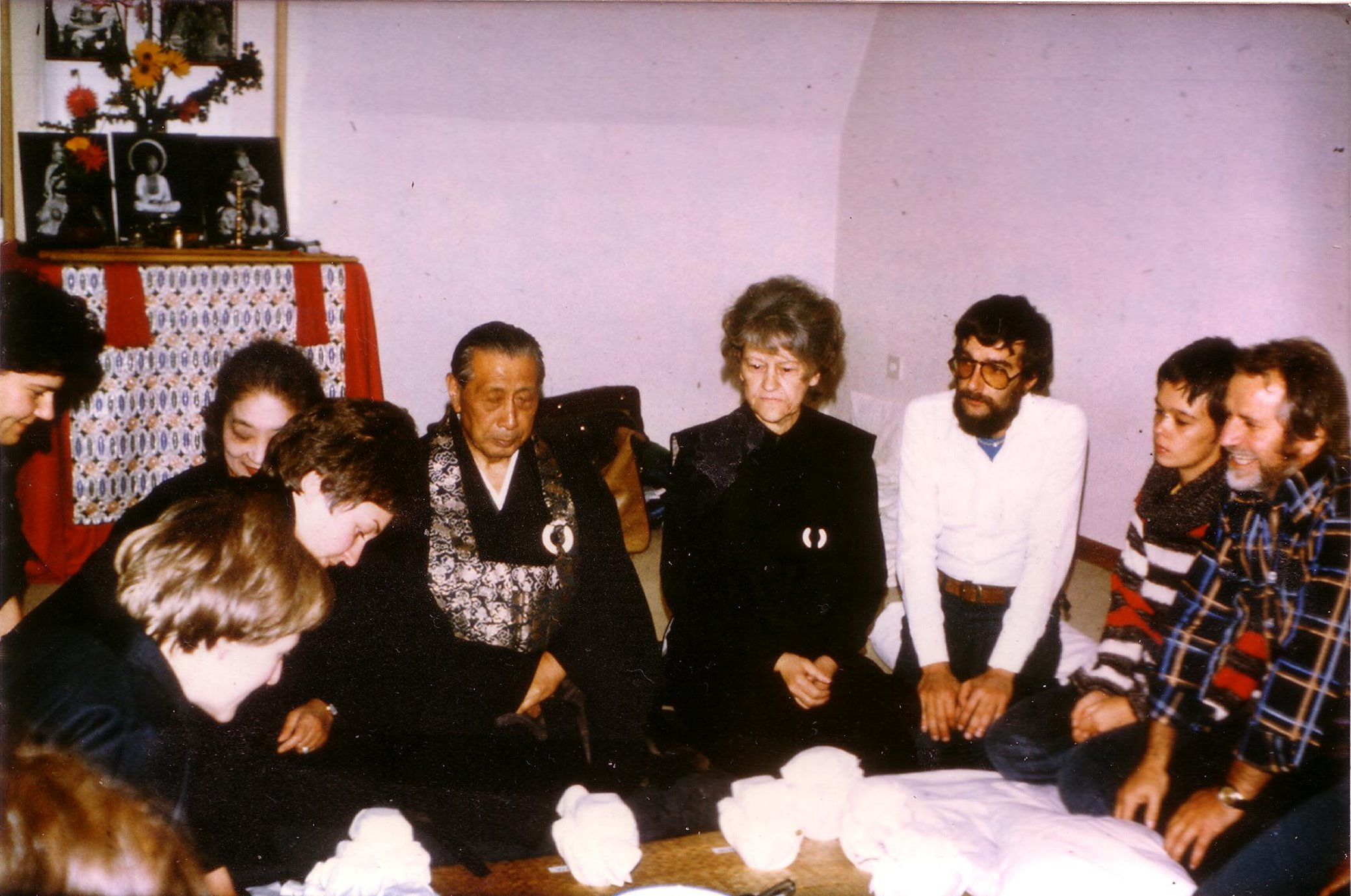

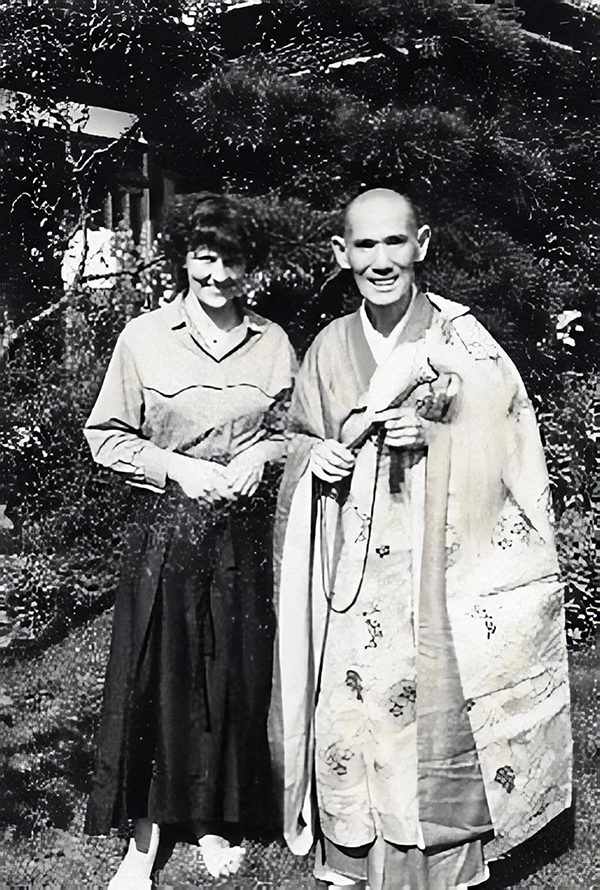
