= Kogenshitsu Dokutan Sosan =

Japanese Zen priest

Kogenshitsu Dokutan Sōsan (1840-1917) was a Japanese Rinzai Zen priest, who served as abbot of Nanzenji. In the west, he is known for being the Rinzai-teacher with whom Harada Daiun Sogaku, the koan-teacher of Hakuun Yasutani, studied koans.

== See also ==
- Sanbo Kyodan
