= Maria Kannon Zen Center =

Zen center in Texas, US

Coordinates: 32.779601°N 96.719742°W

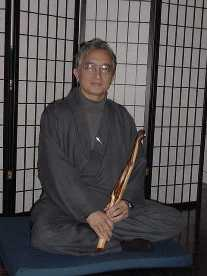
- Ruben Habito, guiding teacher

Religion
- Affiliation: Sanbo Kyodan; Independent Catholic

Location
- Location: White Rock UMC 1450 Old Gate Lane Room 202 Dallas, TX 75218
- Country: United States
- Interactive map of Maria Kannon Zen Center

Architecture
- Completed: 1991

Website
- http://www.mkzc.org/

Maria Kannon Zen Center (MKZC) is a non-profit practice center in the Sanbo Kyodan tradition of Zen Buddhism, located in Dallas, Texas and founded in 1991 by the guiding teacher Ruben Habito (a Dharma heir of Yamada Koun). MKZC derives its name by combining the names of the Virgin Mary of Christianity and Kannon (Guanyin) bodhisattva of Buddhism. It is actually the name of a figurine revered in Japan during Christian persecution there. Many of the MKZC members are individuals who consider themselves Christian, with Habito himself being a practicing Catholic and former Jesuit priest. MKZC is listed with the American Zen Teachers Association.

== See also ==
- Buddhism in the United States
- Timeline of Zen Buddhism in the United States
- Kakure Kirishitan
