= Bokusan Nishiari =

Prominent Japanese Sōtō Zen Buddhist monk (1821-1910)

Bokusan Nishiari 西有穆山
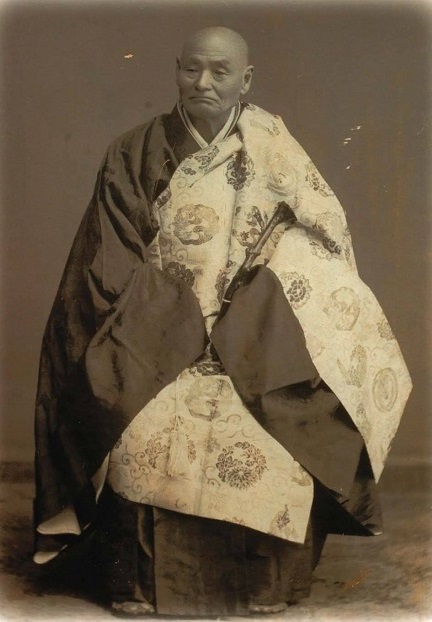
- Title: Chán master

Personal life
- Born: Kazuyoshi Sasamoto 笹本万吉; 17 November 1821 Hachinohe, Aomori, Japan
- Died: 4 December 1910 (aged 89) Yokohama, Kanagawa, Japan

Religious life
- Religion: Zen
- School: Sōtō

Senior posting
- Teacher: Various
- Predecessor: Ansu Taigen
- Successor: Kishizawa Ian
- Students: Sōtan Oka, Takudō Kuruma, Ian Kishizawa

Bokusan Nishiari (Japanese: 西有穆山; rōmaji: Nishiari Bokusan), was a prominent Japanese Sōtō Zen Buddhist monk during the Meiji Era. He is considered one of the most influential Sōtō priests of the modern era due to his elevation of the status of the school's founder Eihei Dōgen, the many prominent positions he held during his lifetime, and his almost equally prolific disciples Sōtan Oka and Ian Kishizawa. Nishiari's positions included abbot of Sōtō's head temple Sōji-ji, professor at what would become Komazawa University, and chief priest, or kanchō, of the entire Sōtō school. His student Sōtan Oka was the first abbot of Antai-ji and a teacher to both Kōdō Sawaki and Hashimoto Ekō, each of whom are the source of Zen lineages in the United States. His student Ian Kishizawa taught Shunryū Suzuki, the founder of the San Francisco Zen Center. Though critical of Nishiari later in his life, the founder of the Sanbō Kyōdan sect Hakuun Yasutani also studied extensively with him and Kishizawa. The Buddhist studies scholar William Bodiford writes of Nishiari:

Today, when someone remembers Dōgen or thinks of Sōtō Zen, most often that person automatically thinks of Dōgen's Shōbōgenzō. This kind of automatic association of Dōgen with this work is very much a modern development. By the end of the fifteenth century most of Dōgen's writings had been hidden from view in temple vaults where they became secret treasures ... In earlier generations only one Zen teacher, Nishiari Bokusan (1821–1910), is known to have ever lectured on how the Shōbōgenzō should be read and understood.
