= Habito =

Habito is a Filipino surname. Notable people with the surname include:

- Cielito Habito (born 1953), Filipino economist, academic, and journalist
- Ruben Habito (born c. 1947), Filipino Zen Buddhist and writer
