= Hosshin-ji =

Buddhist temple in Fukui Prefecture, Japan

Coordinates: 35°29′18.5″N 135°44′33.3″E

Hosshin-ji (発心寺) is a Soto Zen temple in Obama, Fukui Prefecture, Japan. The temple is known for its rigorous training. Harada Daiun Sogaku served as abbott in Hosshin-ji in 1924 before going on to serve at a number of other temples.
