= Ama Samy =

Indian Zen master and Jesuit priest (born 1936)

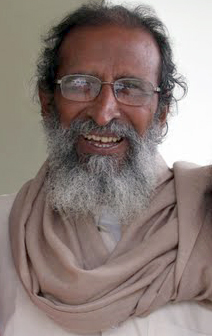
- Title: Zen master Jesuit

Personal life
- Born: May 21, 1936
- Died: November 7, 2026 (aged 90)
- Website: www.kanzeonzendo.in

Religious life
- Religion: Zen Buddhism, Christianity
- School: Bodhi Sangha
- Lineage: Harada-Yasutani

Senior posting
- Teacher: Yamada Koun

Ama Samy (Arul Maria Arokiasamy, 1936–2026) was an Indian Zen master and founder of the Bodhi Sangha Zen school.

== Biography ==
Ama Samy was born to Christian parents in Burma in 1936 and grew up in India. After becoming a Jesuit in 1972, he began visiting Hindu ashrams and Buddhist meditation centers. He was introduced to Ramana Maharshi's teachings by Swami Abhishiktananda. His searching led him to become a wandering beggar for a period and to settle down as a hermit. With the help of Father Hugo Enomiya-Lassalle, he visited Japan and trained with Yamada Koun Roshi of Sanbo Kyodan. In 1982, Yamada Roshi authorized him to teach Zen. He received the Japanese Dharma name Gen'un-ken (Gen: dark, obscure, mystery; Un: cloud).

Ama Samy founded the Bodhi Sangha, the community of his disciples, in 1986. Bodhi Sangha became an independent Zen school when he left the Sanbo Kyodan organization in 2002. Ama Samy's method of teaching embraces both Soto and Rinzai Zen traditions and draws from the resources of Christianity and other religions. He founded two Zen centers near Kodaikanal in South India, Bodhi Zendo (opened in 1996) and Kanzeon Zendo (opened in 2022), where he lived and taught. Ama Samy was a member of the Society of Jesus. Since his transition to Kanzeon Zendo, however, he considered his relationship to be of a different kind. Since Father Lassalle first invited Ama Samy to join him on a tour of Europe in 1985, Ama Samy spent several months each year leading retreats in Europe, Australia, and the USA. With the help of his students, he also founded Little Flower, a non-profit organization supporting women, children and landless people in South India.

== Dharma Successors ==
Ama Samy appointed the following teachers:

- de:Stefan Bauberger (b. 1960), Zen master, resides in Germany, separated from Bodhi Sangha in 2009
- Johannes Fischer (b. 1957), Zen master, resides in Germany, separated from Bodhi Sangha in 2018
- Carl Hooper (b. 1943), Zen master, resides in Australia
- Gert Lüderitz (b. 1950), Zen master, resides in Germany
- Mathew, Cyril Antony, SJ (b. 1970), Zen master, resides in India
- Angela Pliske (b. 1937), Sensei (Zen teacher), resides in Czech Republic
- Olaf Strelcyk (b. 1978), Zen master, resides in the United States

== Books ==
In English:

- Samy, Ama (2013). Zen: The Wayless Way. ASIN B00K7Z645S.
- Samy, Ama (2012). Zen: The Great Way has No Gates. ISBN 978-9381597248.
- Samy, Ama (2010). Zen: Ancient and Modern, The Way to Heart-Mind. ISBN 978-9380253411.
- Samy, Ama (2007). The Zen Way: Tradition, Transmission, Challenges. ISBN 978-8189882143.
- Samy, Ama (2006). Zen Meditation for Life and Death, Christians and Therapists. ISBN 978-8186778555.
- Samy, Ama (2005). Zen: Awakening to Your Original Face. ISBN 978-8185602868.
- Samy, Ama (2002). Zen Heart, Zen Mind: The Teachings of Zen Master Ama Samy. ISBN 978-8185602813.

In German:

- Samy, Ama (2014). ZEN - Der große Weg ist ohne Tor. ISBN 978-3899018127.
- Samy, Ama (2007). Zen - Praxis und Dialog. ISBN 978-3932337079.
- Samy, Ama (2005). Zen und Erleuchtung: Zehn Meditationen eines Zen Meisters. ISBN 978-3896202567.
- Samy, Ama (2002). Zen: Erwachen zum ursprünglichen Gesicht. ISBN 978-3896201928.
- Samy, Ama (1995). Warum Bodhidharma in den Westen kam oder kann es ein europäisches Zen geben?. ISBN 978-3895680052.
- Samy, Ama (1991). Leere und Fülle. Zen aus Indien in christlicher Praxis. ISBN 978-3466203505.

In Dutch:

- Samy, Ama (2006). Zen Hart, Zen Geest - op zoek naar je Oorspronkelijk Gelaat. ISBN 978-9056701369.
- Samy, Ama (1998). Waarom kwam Bodhidharma naar het Westen? de ontmoeting van zen met het Westen. ISBN 978-9056700249.

In French:

- Samy, Ama (2010). Coeur zen, esprit zen: Les enseignements du maître zen Ama Samy. ISBN 978-2354320492.

In Spanish:

- Samy, Ama (1998). Por qué Bodhidharma vino a occidente? La Transmisión del Zen: problemas, peligros y promesa. ISBN 978-8493622718.
- Samy, Ama (1995). Vacío Y Plenitud: Zen de la India en la práctica cristiana. ISBN 978-8428517393.

In Swedish:

- Samy, Ama (1997). Om överföringen av Zen till väst - Varfö kom Bodhidharma till väst?. ISBN 978-9163052521.

== See also ==
Hakuun Yasutani Lineage Chart
