= Willigis Jäger =

German friar and Buddhist teacher

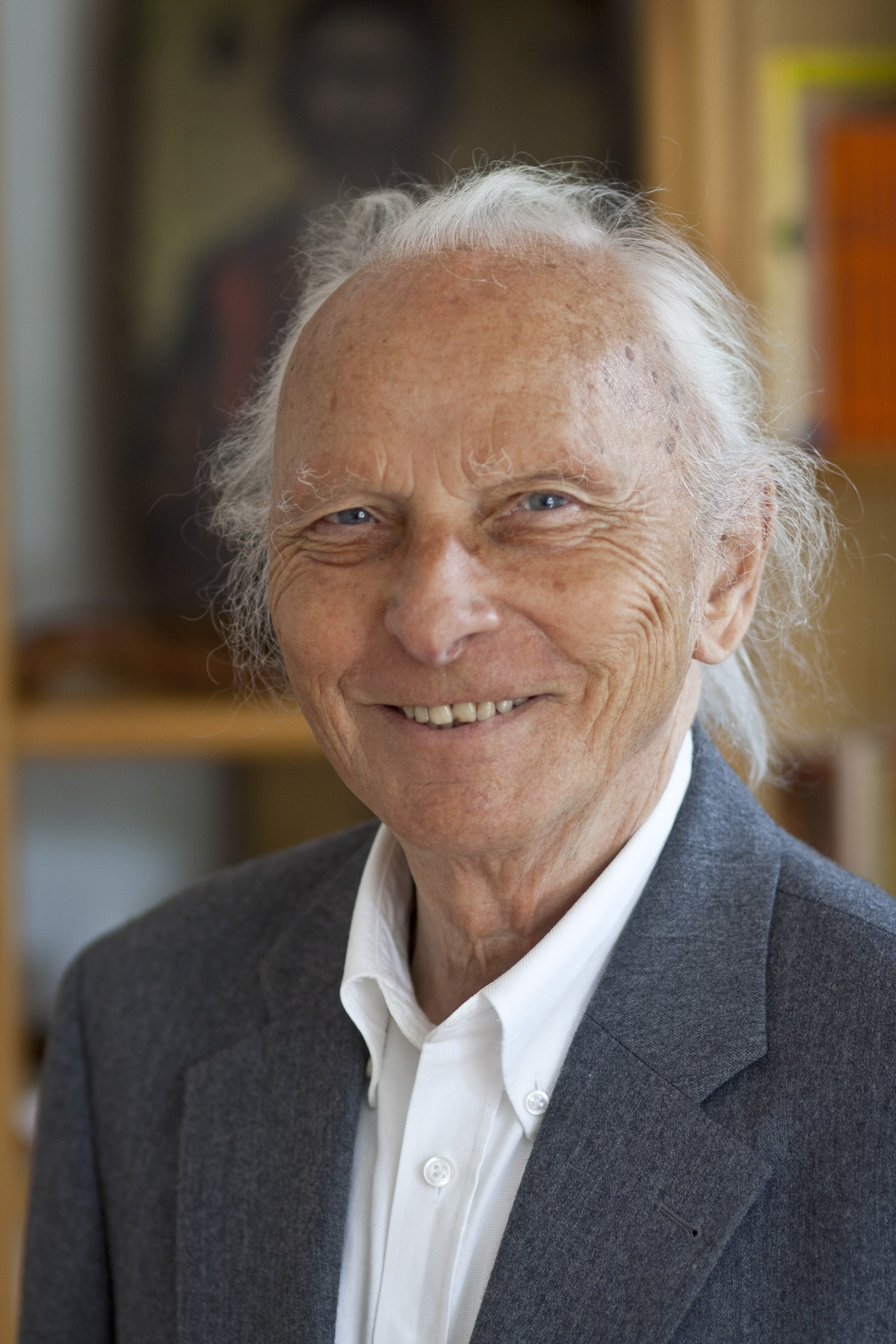
- Jäger in 2010
- Born: 7 March 1925; Hösbach, Bavaria, Germany
- Died: 20 March 2020 (aged 95); Holzkirchen, Bavaria, Germany
- Occupations: Benedictine friar; Mystic; Zen master
- Organizations: Münsterschwarzach Abbey; Benediktushof; West-Östliche Weisheit (foundation)

Willigis Jäger (German: [ˈvɪlɪgɪs ˈjɛːgɐ]; 7 March 1925 – 20 March 2020) was a German Catholic priest and Benedictine monk. He was a Zen master who trained and taught in the Sanbo Kyodan tradition. Jäger founded a centre of Zen and contemplation at the Münsterschwarzach Abbey in 1983, and his own Benediktushof, an inter-faith centre of meditation and awareness, in 2003.

== Life ==
Jäger was born on 7 March 1925 in Hösbach. He entered the Benedictine order at Münsterschwarzach Abbey in 1946, and studied philosophy and theology from 1948. In 1952, he was ordained as a priest. Jäger worked as a teacher in the abbey's secondary school. From 1960, he was responsible for mission and development at the Bund der Deutschen Katholischen Jugend youth association. The same year, he began to work for Missio, an ecumenical missionary movement which sent him on trips to countries including Japan.

From 1972, he studied Zen in Japan for six years with Hugo E. Lassalle and Yamada Ko-Un Roshi, entering Yamada's convent in 1975. He gained authorisation to teach Zen in 1980. Jäger taught in the Sanbo Kyodan tradition (being given the Japanese name Koun-ken). He founded a centre of Zen and Contemplation at the Münsterschwarzach Abbey in 1983. In 1980, an ecumenical study group of contemplative prayer was founded, which became the Würzburg School of Contemplation. Jäger taught as part of Sanbo Kyodan until 2009, and then continued his own sangha independently.

Catholic authorities questioned his teaching starting in 2000, and he was banned from teaching in public events and in writing in 2002. He left the abbey in 2003 but continued his work. That year, he founded the Benediktushof, an inter-religious centre of meditation and awareness, where he lived and taught. In 2007, he established a foundation named West-Östliche Weisheit (West-East Wisdom), propagating the spirituality taught at the Benediktushof.

Jäger died in Holzkirchen on 20 March 2020.

== Books ==
Some of Jäger's many books were translated to English, including:

- The Way to Contemplation: Encountering God Today (Mahwah NJ:Paulist Press, 1987)
- Contemplation: A Christian Path (1994)
- Search for the Meaning of Life: Essays and Reflections on the Mystical Experience (1995)
