= Ryoun Yamada =

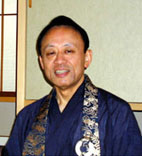
- Title: Roshi

Personal life
- Born: Yamada Masamichi Japan

Religious life
- Religion: Buddhism
- School: Sanbo Kyodan
- Lineage: Harada-Yasutani

Senior posting
- Based in: San'un Zendo; Itoki Corporation
- Predecessor: Yamada Koun

Ryoun Yamada, a.k.a. Yamada Ryoun or Yamada Masamichi, the son of the late Yamada Koun, is the current Zen master of San'un Zendo in Kamakura, Japan and the Abbot of the Sanbo Zen school of Zen Buddhism.

== Career ==
As Sanbo Zen is a lay organization of Zen, Yamada also worked at Mitsubishi Bank and Mitsubishi Securities. Currently he heads the Itoki Corporation.

As of the late 1990s, Yamada was returning to Japan only a few times each year.

== See also ==
- Buddhism in Japan
