= Buddhist modernism =

New movements based on reinterpreted Buddhism

Buddhist modernism (also referred to as modern Buddhism, modernist Buddhism, Neo-Buddhism, and Protestant Buddhism) are new movements based on modern era reinterpretations of Buddhism. David McMahan states that modernism in Buddhism is similar to those found in other religions. The sources of influences have variously been an engagement of Buddhist communities and teachers with the new cultures and methodologies such as "Western monotheism; rationalism and scientific naturalism; and Romantic expressivism". The influence of monotheism has been the internalization of Buddhist gods to make it acceptable in modern Western society, while scientific naturalism and romanticism has influenced the emphasis on current life, empirical defense, reason, psychological and health benefits.

The Neo-Buddhism movements differ in their doctrines and practices from the historical, mainstream Theravada, Mahayana and Vajrayana Buddhist traditions. A co-creation of Western Orientalists and reform-minded Asian Buddhists, Buddhist modernism has been a reformulation of Buddhist concepts that has de-emphasized traditional Buddhist doctrines, cosmology, rituals, monasticism, clerical hierarchy and icon worship. The term came into vogue during the colonial and post-colonial era studies of Asian religions, and is found in sources such as Louis de La Vallée-Poussin's 1910 article.

Examples of Buddhist modernism movements and traditions include Humanistic Buddhism, Secular Buddhism, Engaged Buddhism, Navayana, the Japanese-initiated new lay organizations of Nichiren Buddhism such as Soka Gakkai, Girō Seno’o’s Youth League for Revitalizing Buddhism, the Dobokai movement and its descendants such as Oneness Buddhism, Sanbo Kyodan and the missionary activity of Zen masters in the United States, the New Kadampa Tradition and the missionary activity of Tibetan Buddhist masters in the West (leading the quickly growing Buddhist movement in France), the Vipassana Movement, the Triratna Buddhist Community, Dharma Drum Mountain, Fo Guang Shan, Won Buddhism, the Great Western Vehicle, Tzu Chi, and Juniper Foundation.

== Overview ==
Buddhist modernism emerged during the late 19th-century and early 20th-century colonial era, as a co-creation of Western Orientalists and reform-minded Buddhists. It appropriated elements of Western philosophy, psychological insights as well as themes increasingly felt to be secular and proper. It de-emphasized or denied ritual elements, cosmology, gods, icons, rebirth, karma, monasticism, clerical hierarchy and other Buddhist concepts. Instead, modernistic Buddhism has emphasized interior exploration, satisfaction in the current life, and themes such as cosmic interdependence. Some advocates of Buddhist modernism claim their new interpretations to be original teachings of the Buddha, and state that the core doctrines and traditional practices found in Theravada, Mahayana and Vajrayana Buddhism are extraneous accretions that were interpolated and introduced after Buddha died. According to McMahan, Buddhism of the form found in the West today has been deeply influenced by this modernism.

Buddhist modernist traditions are reconstructions and a reformulation with emphasis on rationality, meditation, compatibility with modern science about body and mind. In the modernistic presentations, Theravada, Mahayana and Vajrayana Buddhist practices are "detraditionalized", in that they are often presented in such a way that occludes their historical construction. Instead, Buddhist modernist traditions often employ an essentialized description of their tradition, where key tenets are reformulated in universal terms, and the modernistic practices significantly differ from Asian Buddhist communities with centuries-old traditions.

=== History ===
The earliest western accounts of Buddhism were by 19th-century European travelers and Christian missionaries who, according to James Coleman, portrayed it as another "heathen religion with strange gods and exotic ceremonies", where their concern was not understanding the religion but to debunk it. By mid 19th-century, European scholars gave a new picture but once again in concepts understood in the West. They described Buddhism as a "life-denying faith" that rejected all the Christian ideas such as "God, man, life, eternity"; it was an exotic Asian religion that taught nirvana, which was explained then as "annihilation of the individual". In 1879, Edwin Arnold's book The Light of Asia presented a more sympathetic account of Buddhism, in the form of the life of the Buddha, emphasizing the parallels between the Buddha and the Christ.

The sociopolitical developments in Europe, the rise of scientific theories such as those of Charles Darwin, in late 19th-century and early 20th-century created interest in Buddhism and other eastern religions, but it was studied in the West and those trained in Western education system with the prevalent cultural premises and modernism. The first comprehensive study of Buddhist modernism in the Theravada tradition as a distinct phenomenon was published in 1966 by Heinz Bechert. Bechert regarded Buddhist modernism as "modern Buddhist revivalism" in postcolonial societies like Sri Lanka. He identified several characteristics of Buddhist modernism: new interpretations of early Buddhist teachings, de-mythologisation and reinterpretation of Buddhism as "scientific religion", social philosophy or "philosophy of optimism", emphasis on equality and democracy, "activism" and social engagement, support of Buddhist nationalism, and the revival of meditation practice.

== Japan: Neo-Buddhism ==
The term Neo-Buddhism and modernism in the context of Japanese Buddhist and Western interactions appear in late 19th-century and early 20th-century publications. For example, Andre Bellesort used the term in 1901, while Louis de La Vallée-Poussin used it in a 1910 article. According to James Coleman, the first presenters of a modernistic Buddhism before a Western audience were Anagarika Dharmapala and Soyen Shaku in 1893 at The World Congress of Religion. Shaku's student D.T. Suzuki was a prolific writer, fluent in English and he introduced Zen Buddhism to Westerners.

=== "New Buddhism" and Japanese Nationalism ===
Scholars such as Martin Verhoeven and Robert Sharf, as well as Japanese Zen monk G. Victor Sogen Hori, have argued that the breed of Japanese Zen that was propagated by New Buddhism ideologues, such as Imakita Kosen and Soyen Shaku, was not typical of Japanese Zen during their time, nor is it typical of Japanese Zen now. Although greatly altered by the Meiji Restoration, Japanese Zen still flourishes as a monastic tradition. The Zen tradition in Japan, aside from the New Buddhism style of it, required a great deal of time and discipline from monks that laity would have difficulty finding. Zen monks were often expected to have spent several years in intensive doctrinal study, memorizing sutras and poring over commentaries, before even entering the monastery to undergo koan practice in sanzen with the roshi. The fact that Suzuki himself was able to do so as a layman was largely a result of New Buddhism.

At the onset of the Meiji period, in 1868, when Japan entered into the international community and began to industrialize and modernize at an astounding rate, Buddhism was briefly persecuted in Japan as "a corrupt, decadent, anti-social, parasitic, and superstitious creed, inimical to Japan's need for scientific and technological advancement." The Japanese government dedicated itself to the eradication of the tradition, which was seen as foreign, incapable of fostering the sentiments that would be vital for national, ideological cohesion. In addition to this, industrialization had taken its toll on the Buddhist establishment as well, leading to the breakdown of the parishioner system that had funded monasteries for centuries. In response to this seemingly intractable state of turmoil, a group of modern Buddhist leaders emerged to argue for the Buddhist cause. These leaders stood in agreement with the government persecution of Buddhism, stating that Buddhist institutions were indeed corrupted and in need of revitalization.

This Japanese movement became known as Shin Bukkyō ('New Buddhism'). The leaders themselves were university-educated intellectuals who had been exposed to a vast body of Western intellectual literature. The fact that what was presented to the West as Japanese Zen would be so commensurate with the Enlightenment critique of "superstitious," institutional, or ritual-based religion is due to this fact, as such ideals directly informed the creation of this new tradition. This reformulation work has roots in the writings of Eugène Burnouf in the 1840s, who expressed his liking for "the Brahmins, the Buddhists, the Zoroastrians" and a dislike for "the Jesuits" to Max Muller. Imakita Kosen, who would become D.T. Suzuki's teacher in Zen until his death in 1892, was an important figure in this movement. Largely responding to the Reformation critique of elite institutionalism, he opened Engakuji monastery to lay practitioners, which would allow students like Suzuki unprecedented access to Zen practice.

Advocates of New Buddhism, like Kosen and his successor Soyen Shaku, not only saw this movement as a defense of Buddhism against government persecution, they also saw it as a way to bring their nation into the modern world as a competitive, cultural force. Kosen himself was even employed by the Japanese government as a "national evangelist" during the 1870s. The cause of Japanese nationalism and the portrayal of Japan as a superior cultural entity on the international scene was at the heart of the Zen missionary movement. Zen would be touted as the essential Japanese religion, fully embodied by the bushido, or samurai spirit, an expression of the Japanese people in the fullest sense, in spite of the fact that this version of Zen was a recent invention in Japan that was largely based on Western philosophical ideals.

Soyen Shaku, Suzuki's teacher in Zen after Kosen's death in 1892, claimed "Religion is the only force in which the Western people know that they are inferior to the nations of the East ... Let us wed the Great Vehicle [Mahayana Buddhism] to Western thought...at Chicago next year [referring to the 1893 World Parliament of Religions] the fitting time will come." According to Martin Verhoeven, "The spiritual crisis of the West exposed its Achilles' heel to be vanquished. Though economically and technologically bested by the Western powers, Japan saw a chance to reassert its sense of cultural superiority via religion."

=== D.T. Suzuki ===
For a number of reasons, several scholars have identified D.T. Suzuki—whose works were popular in the West from the 1930s onward, and particularly in the 1950s and 60s—as a "Buddhist Modernist." Suzuki's depiction of Zen Buddhism can be classified as Buddhist Modernist in that it employs all of these traits. That he was a university-educated intellectual steeped in knowledge of Western philosophy and literature allowed him to be particularly successful and persuasive in arguing his case to a Western audience. As Suzuki presented it, Zen Buddhism was a highly practical religion whose emphasis on direct experience made it particularly comparable to forms of mysticism that scholars such as William James had emphasized as the fountainhead of all religious sentiment. As McMahan explains, "In his discussion of humanity and nature, Suzuki takes Zen literature out of its social, ritual, and ethical contexts and reframes it in terms of a language of metaphysics derived from German Romantic idealism, English Romanticism, and American Transcendentalism." Drawing on these traditions, Suzuki presents a version of Zen that has been described by hostile critics as detraditionalized and essentialized:

Zen is the ultimate fact of all philosophy and religion. Every intellectual effort must culminate in it, or rather must start from it, if it is to bear any practical fruits. Every religious faith must spring from it if it has to prove at all efficiently and livingly workable in our active life. Therefore Zen is not necessarily the fountain of Buddhist thought and life alone; it is very much alive also in Christianity, Mohammedanism, in Taoism, and even positivistic Confucianism. What makes all these religions and philosophies vital and inspiring, keeping up their usefulness and efficiency, is due to the presence in them of what I may designate as the Zen element.

Scholars such as Robert Sharf have argued that such statements also betray inklings of nationalist sentiment, common to many early Buddhist Modernists, in that they portray Zen, which Suzuki had described as representing the essence of the Japanese people, as superior to all other religions.

== India: Navayana ==
A Neo-Buddhist movement was founded by the Indian Dalit leader B. R. Ambedkar in the 1950s. Ambedkar held a press conference on October 13, 1956, announcing his rejection of many traditional interpretations of practices and precepts of Theravada and Mahayana vehicles, as well as of Hinduism. He then adopted Navayana Buddhism, and converted between 500,000 and 600,000 Dalits to his Neo-Buddhism movement. He perceived it was necessary for them to convert for advancing equality and societal change. All the elements of religious modernism, state Christopher Queen and Sallie King, may be found in Ambedkar Buddhism where his The Buddha and His Dhamma abandons the traditional precepts and practices, then adopts science, activism and social reforms as a form of Engaged Buddhism. Ambedkar's formulation of Buddhism is different from Western modernism, states Skaria, given his synthesis of the ideas of modern Karl Marx into the structure of ideas by the ancient Buddha.

According to Ambedkar, several of the core beliefs and doctrines of traditional Buddhist traditions such as Four Noble Truths and Anatta as flawed and pessimistic, may have been inserted into the Buddhist scriptures by wrong headed Buddhist monks of a later era. These should not be considered as Buddha's teachings in Ambedkar's view. Other foundational concepts of Buddhism such as Karma and Rebirth were considered by Ambedkar as superstitions.

Navayana abandons practices and precepts such as the institution of monk after renunciation, ideas such as karma, rebirth in afterlife, samsara, meditation, nirvana and Four Noble Truths considered to be foundational in the Buddhist traditions. Ambedkar's Neo-Buddhism rejected these ideas and re-interpreted the Buddha's religion in terms of class struggle, social equality and social justice.

Ambedkar called his version of Buddhism Navayana or Neo-Buddhism. His book, The Buddha and His Dhamma is the holy book of Navayana followers. According to Junghare, for the followers of Navyana, Ambedkar has become a deity and he is worshipped in its practice.

== West: Naturalized Buddhism ==
Other forms of Neo-Buddhism are found outside Asia, particularly in European nations. According to Bernard Faure – a professor of Religious Studies with a focus on Buddhism, Neo-Buddhism in the forms found in the West is a modernist restatement, a form of spiritual response to anxieties of individuals and the modern world that is not grounded in its ancient ideas, but "a sort of impersonal flavorless or odorless spirituality". It is a re-adaptation, a kind of Buddhism "a la carte", that understands the needs and then is reformulated to fill a void in the West, rather than reflect the ancient canons and secondary literature of Buddhism.

Some Western interpreters of Buddhism have proposed the term "naturalized Buddhism" for few of these movements. It is devoid of rebirth, karma, nirvana, realms of existence, and other concepts of Buddhism, with doctrines such as the Four Noble Truths reformulated and restated in modernistic terms. (Note: According to Owen Flanagan, the proportion of people in North America that believe in heaven is about the same as the proportion of East and Southeast Asia who believe in rebirth. But, 'rebirth' is considered superstitious by many in the West while 'heaven' is not, adds Flanagan, though a reflective naturalistic approach demands that both 'heaven' and 'rebirth' be equally questioned". According to Donald S. Lopez, Buddhist movements in the West have reconstructed a "Scientific Buddha" and a "modern Buddhism" unknown in Asia, "one that may never have existed there before the late 19th-century".) This "deflated secular Buddhism" stresses compassion, impermanence, causality, selfless persons, no Bodhisattvas, no nirvana, no rebirth, and a naturalist approach to well-being of oneself and others. Meditation and spiritual practices such as Vipassana, or its variants, centered around self-development remain a part of the Western Neo-Buddhist movements. According to James Coleman, the focus of most vipassana students in the west "is mainly on meditation practice and a kind of down-to-earth psychological wisdom." (Note: According to Coleman, the goal in Theravada Buddhism "is to uproot the desires and defilements in order to attain nibbana (nirvana in Sanskrit) and win liberation from the otherwise endless round of death and rebirth. But few Western Vipassana teachers pay much attention to the more metaphysical aspects of such concepts as rebirth and nibbana, and of course very few of their students are celibate monks. Their focus is mainly on meditation practice and a kind of down-to-earth psychological wisdom. "As a result," one respected Vipassana teacher writes, "many more Americans of European descent refer to themselves as Vipassana students rather than as students of Theravada Buddhism.")

For many western Buddhists, the rebirth doctrine in the Four Noble Truths teaching is a problematic notion. (Note: Bhikkhu Bodhi, Does Rebirth Make Sense?) (Note: See also: * James Ford, The Karma and Rebirth Debate Within Contemporary Western Buddhism: Some Links to Follow) According to Lamb, "Certain forms of modern western Buddhism [...] see it as purely mythical and thus a dispensable notion." Westerners find "the ideas of karma and rebirth puzzling", states Damien Keown – a professor of Buddhist Ethics. It may not be necessary to believe in some of the core Buddhist doctrines to be a Buddhist, though most Buddhists in Asia do accept these traditional teachings and seek better rebirth. (Note: Vast majority of Buddhist lay people, states Kevin Trainor, have historically pursued Buddhist rituals and practices motivated with rebirth into Deva realm. Fowler and others concur with Trainor, stating that better rebirth, not nirvana, has been the primary focus of a vast majority of lay Buddhists. This they attempt through merit accumulation and good kamma.) The rebirth, karma, realms of existence and cyclic universe doctrines underpin the Four Noble Truths in Buddhism. It is possible to reinterpret the Buddhist doctrines such as the Four Noble Truths, states Keown, since the final goal and the answer to the problem of suffering is nirvana and not rebirth.

According to Konik,

Since the fundamental problems underlying early Indian Buddhism and contemporary western Buddhism are not the same, the validity of applying the set of solutions developed by the first to the situation of the second becomes a question of great importance. Simply putting an end to rebirth would not necessarily strike the western Buddhist as the ultimate answer, as it certainly was for early Indian Buddhists.

Traditional Buddhist scholars disagree with these modernist Western interpretations. Bhikkhu Bodhi, for example, states that rebirth is an integral part of the Buddhist teachings as found in the sutras, despite the problems that "modernist interpreters of Buddhism" seem to have with it. (Note: Bhikkhu Bodhi: "Newcomers to Buddhism are usually impressed by the clarity, directness, and earthy practicality of the Dhamma as embodied in such basic teachings as the Four Noble Truths, the Noble Eightfold Path, and the threefold training. These teachings, as clear as day-light, are accessible to any serious seeker looking for a way beyond suffering. When, however, these seekers encounter the doctrine of rebirth, they often balk, convinced it just doesn't make sense. At this point, they suspect that the teaching has swerved off course, tumbling from the grand highway of reason into wistfulness and speculation. Even modernist interpreters of Buddhism seem to have trouble taking the rebirth teaching seriously. Some dismiss it as just a piece of cultural baggage, "ancient Indian metaphysics," that the Buddha retained in deference to the world view of his age. Others interpret it as a metaphor for the change of mental states, with the realms of rebirth seen as symbols for psychological archetypes. A few critics even question the authenticity of the texts on rebirth, arguing that they must be interpolations. A quick glance at the Pali suttas would show that none of these claims has much substance. The teaching of rebirth crops up almost everywhere in the Canon, and is so closely bound to a host of other doctrines that to remove it would virtually reduce the Dhamma to tatters. Moreover, when the suttas speak about rebirth into the five realms — the hells, the animal world, the spirit realm, the human world, and the heavens — they never hint that these terms are meant symbolically. To the contrary, they even say that rebirth occurs "with the breakup of the body, after death," which clearly implies they intend the idea of rebirth to be taken quite literally.") Thanissaro Bhikkhu, as another example, rejects the "modern argument" that "one can still obtain all the results of the practice without having to accept the possibility of rebirth." He states, "rebirth has always been a central teaching in the Buddhist tradition." (Note: Thanissaro Bhikkhu, The Truth of Rebirth. And Why it Matters for Buddhist Practice) (Note: Thanissaro Bhikkhu: "A second modern argument against accepting the canonical accounts of what's known in awakening — and in particular, the knowledge of rebirth achieved in awakening — is that one can still obtain all the results of the practice without having to accept the possibility of rebirth. After all, all the factors leading to suffering are all immediately present to awareness, so there should be no need, when trying to abandon them, to accept any premises about where they may or may not lead in the future. This objection, however, ignores the role of appropriate attention on the path. As we noted above, one of its roles is to examine and abandon the assumptions that underlie one's views on the metaphysics of personal identity. Unless you're willing to step back from your own views — such as those concerning what a person is, and why that makes rebirth impossible — and subject them to this sort of examination, there's something lacking in your path. You'll remain entangled in the questions of inappropriate attention, which will prevent you from actually identifying and abandoning the causes of suffering and achieving the full results of the practice. In addition, the terms of appropriate attention — the four noble truths — are not concerned simply with events arising and passing away in the present moment. They also focus on the causal connections among those events, connections that occur both in the immediate present and over time. If you limit your focus solely to connections in the present while ignoring those over time, you can't fully comprehend the ways in which craving causes suffering: not only by latching on to the four kinds of nutriment, but also giving rise to the four kinds of nutriment as well.) (Note: Konik further notes: No doubt, according to the early Indian Buddhist tradition, the Buddha's great discovery, as condensed in his experience of nirvana, involved the remembrance of his many former existences, presupposing as fact the reality of a never-ending process of rebirth as a source of deep anxiety, and an acceptance of the Buddha's overcoming of that fate as ultimate liberation.)

According to Owen Flanagan, the Dalai Lama states that "Buddhists believe in rebirth" and that this belief has been common among his followers. However, the Dalai Lama's belief in rebirth, adds Flanagan, is not the same as belief in reincarnation, because rebirth in Buddhism is envisioned as happening without an assumption of an "atman, self, soul", rather through a "consciousness conceived along the anatman lines". (Note: The Dalai Lama himself is regarded to be an incarnation of the thirteen previous Dalai Lamas, who are all manifestations of Avalokitasvara.) The doctrine of rebirth is considered mandatory in Tibetan Buddhism, and across many Buddhist sects. According to Melford Spiro, the reinterpretations of Buddhism that discard rebirth undermine the Four Noble Truths, for it does not address the existential question for the Buddhist as to "why live? why not commit suicide, hasten the end of dukkha in current life by ending life". In traditional Buddhism, rebirth continues the dukkha and the path to cessation of dukkha isn't suicide, but the fourth reality of the Four Noble Truths.

According to Christopher Gowans, for "most ordinary Buddhists, today as well as in the past, their basic moral orientation is governed by belief in karma and rebirth". Buddhist morality hinges on the hope of well being in this lifetime or in future rebirth, with nirvana (enlightenment) a project for a future lifetime. A denial of karma and rebirth undermines their history, moral orientation and religious foundations. However, adds Gowans, many Western followers and people interested in exploring Buddhism are skeptical and object to the belief in karma and rebirth foundational to the Four Noble Truths. (Note: Gowans groups the objections into three categories. The first objection can be called "consistency objection", which asks if "there is no self (atman, soul), then what is reborn and how does karma work?". The second objection can be called "naturalism objection", which asks "can rebirth be scientifically proven, what evidence is there that rebirth happens". The third objection can be called "morality objection", which asks "why presume that an infant born with an illness, is because of karma in previous life" as seems implied by Majjhima Nikāya section 3.204 for example. Gowans provides a summary of prevailing answers, clarifications and explanations proffered by practicing Buddhists.)

The "naturalized Buddhism", according to Gowans, is a radical revision to traditional Buddhist thought and practice, and it attacks the structure behind the hopes, needs and rationalization of the realities of human life to traditional Buddhists in East, Southeast and South Asia. Gowan posits that for traditional Buddhists, "naturalized Buddhism" might come across as a pale imitation of what Buddhism means in their life.

== Other New Buddhisms ==
According to Burkhard Scherer – a professor of Comparative Religion, the novel interpretations are a new, separate Buddhist sectarian lineage and Shambhala International "has to be described as New Buddhism (Coleman) or, better still, Neo-Buddhism".

In Central and Eastern Europe, according to Burkhard Scherer, the fast growing Diamond Way Buddhism started by Hannah and Ole Nydahl is a Neo-orthoprax Buddhism movement. The charismatic leadership of Nydahl and his 600 dharma centers worldwide have made it the largest convert movement in Eastern Europe, but its interpretations of Tibetan Buddhism and tantric meditation techniques have been criticized by both traditional Buddhists and non-Buddhists.

Others have used "New Buddhism" to describe socially engaged Buddhism. In 2001, David Brazier published his "manifesto of the New Buddhism," calling for a shift from monasticism and traditional doctrines to innovative interpretations engaging with the secular world. He argues that traditional schools like Theravada and Mahayana have become "instruments of state policy for subduing rather than liberating the population" and focus on "individual salvation rather than addressing the roots of world disease."

Donald S. Lopez Jr. uses the term "Modern Buddhism" to describe the entirety of Buddhist modernist traditions, which he suggests "has developed into a kind of transnational Buddhist sect", "an international Buddhism that transcends cultural and national boundaries, creating...a cosmopolitan network of intellectuals, writing most often in English", which he claims is rooted neither in geography nor in traditional schools but is the modern aspect of a variety of Buddhist schools in different locations. Moreover, he suggests that they have their own cosmopolitan lineage and canonical "scriptures," mainly the works of popular and semischolarly authors—figures from the formative years of modern Buddhism, including Soyen Shaku, Dwight Goddard, D. T. Suzuki, and Alexandra David-Neel, Shunryu Suzuki, Sangharakshita and Alan Watts. Controversially, he even goes as far to include the Fourteenth Dalai Lama, Thich Nhat Hanh (Zen master and founder of Plum Village and the global movement for Engaged Buddhism) and Chögyam Trungpa (Tibetan Buddhist master credited with presenting authentic Buddhist teachings by making a clear distinction between the cultural aspects of Buddhism and the fundamental teachings of Buddhism).

== See also ==
- Buddhism and science
- Buddhism in the West
- Global Buddhist Network
- Index of Buddhism-related articles
- New religious movements
- Mindfulness
- Secular Buddhism

== Sources ==
Printed sources

- Chitkara, M. G. (1998), Buddhism, Reincarnation, and Dalai Lamas of Tibet, APH
- Coleman, James William (2002). The New Buddhism: The Western Transformation of an Ancient Tradition. Oxford University Press. ISBN 978-0-19-515241-8.
- Flanagan, Owen (2014), Science for Monks: Buddhism and Science: A BIT of The Really Hard Problem, MIT Press
- Hayes, Richard P. (2013), "The Internet as Window onto American Buddhism", in Queen, Christopher; Williams, Duncan Ryuken (eds.), American Buddhism: Methods and Findings in Recent Scholarship, Routledge
- Keown, Damien (2000). Buddhism: A Very Short Introduction (Kindle ed.). Oxford University Press.
- Konik, Adrian (2009), Buddhism and Transgression: The Appropriation of Buddhism in the Contemporary West, BRIIL
- Lamb, Christopher (2001), "Cosmology, myth and symbolism", in Harvey, Peter (ed.), Buddhism, Bloomsbury Publishing
- Trainor, Kevin (2004), Buddhism: The Illustrated Guide, Oxford University Press, ISBN 978-0-19-517398-7
- James, Alan; Jacqui, James (1989). Modern Buddhism. Aucana. ISBN 0-9511769-1-9.
- James, William (June 1902). The varieties of religious experience : a study in human nature. London: Longmans, Green & Co. p. 534. ISBN 0-585-23263-6.
- Josephson, Jason Ānanda (2006). "When Buddhism Became a "Religion": Religion and Superstition in the Writings of Inoue Enryō". Japanese Journal of Religious Studies. 33 (1): 143–168.
- Lopez, Donald S. Jr. (2008). Buddhism & science : a guide for the perplexed. Buddhism and modernity. University of Chicago Press. ISBN 978-0-226-49312-1.
- Lopez, Donald S. Jr. (2002). A Modern Buddhist Bible. Beacon Press Books. ISBN 0-8070-1243-2.
- Masuzawa, Tomoko (May 2005). The invention of world religions, or, How European universalism was preserved in the language of pluralism (1st ed.). University of Chicago Press. p. 359. ISBN 978-0-226-50988-4.
- McMahan, David L. (2008), The Making of Buddhist Modernism, Oxford University Press, doi:10.1093/acprof:oso/9780195183276.001.0001, ISBN 978-0-19-518327-6
- Metraux, Daniel A. (2001). The International Expansion of a Modern Buddhist Movement: The Soka Gakkai in Southeast Asia and Australia. University Press of America. ISBN 978-0-7618-1904-2.
- Prebish, Charles S.; Baumann, Martin (2002). Westward Dharma: Buddhism Beyond Asia. University of California Press. ISBN 0-520-23490-1.
- Satō, Giei; Nishimura, Nishin (1973). Unsui: a Diary of Zen Monastic Life (illustrated ed.). University of Hawaii Press. p. 114. ISBN 978-0-8248-0272-1.
- Sharf, Robert H. (August 1993). "The Zen of Japanese Nationalism". History of Religions. 33 (1). The University of Chicago Press: 1–43. doi:10.1086/463354. ISSN 0018-2710. JSTOR 1062782. S2CID 161535877.
- Suzuki, D. T. (1996) [1956]. Barrett, William (ed.). Zen Buddhism : selected writings of D.T. Suzuki. New York: Three Leaves. p. 294. ISBN 978-0-385-48349-0.
- Queen, Christopher (2015). Emmanuel, Steven M. (ed.). A Companion to Buddhist Philosophy. John Wiley & Sons. ISBN 978-1-119-14466-3.
- Verhoeven, Martin (1998). "Americanizing the Buddha: Paul Carus and the Transformation of Asian Thought". In Prebish, Charles; Tanaka, Kenneth (eds.). The faces of Buddhism in America. University of California Press. p. 370. ISBN 978-0-520-21301-2.
- Webb, Russel (2005). "Heinz Bechert 26 June 1932-14". Buddhist Studies Review. 22 (2): 211–216. doi:10.1558/bsrv.v22i2.14041. Archived from the original on 10 April 2022.

Web-sources
