= Robert Baker Aitken =

Zen teacher, political activist

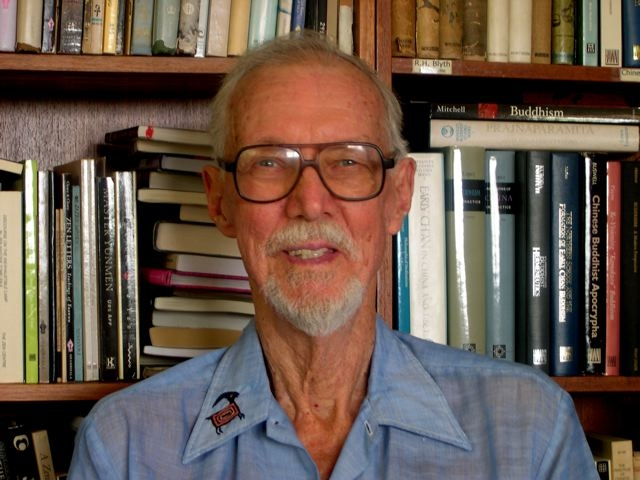
- Title: Roshi

Personal life
- Born: June 19, 1917 Philadelphia, Pennsylvania, US
- Died: August 5, 2010 (aged 93) Honolulu, Hawaii, US
- Spouse: Anne Hopkins Aitken
- Children: 1
- Education: University of Hawaii; University of California, Berkeley
- Website: www.robertaitken.net

Religious life
- Religion: Buddhism
- School: Zen Buddhism
- Lineage: Harada-Yasutani

Senior posting
- Teacher: Soen Nakagawa; Nyogen Senzaki
- Predecessor: Yamada Koun

Robert Baker Dairyu Chotan Aitken Rōshi (June 19, 1917 – August 5, 2010) was a Zen teacher in the Harada-Yasutani lineage. He co-founded the Honolulu Diamond Sangha in 1959 with his wife, Anne Hopkins Aitken. Aitken received Dharma transmission from Koun Yamada in 1985 but decided to live as a layperson. He was a socialist and anarchist who advocated for social justice for homosexuals, women and Native Hawaiians throughout his life, and was one of the original founders of the Buddhist Peace Fellowship.

== Biography ==
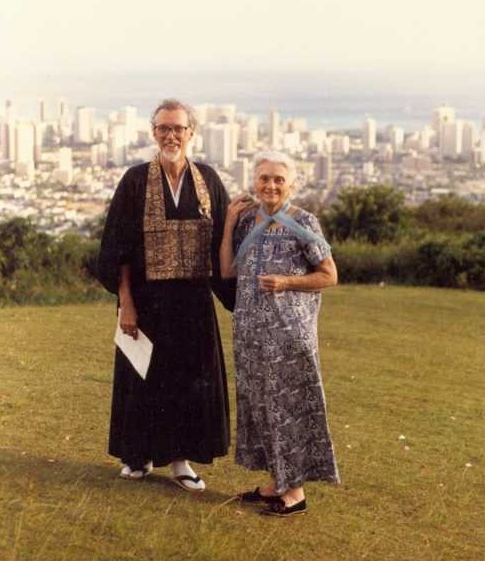
Robert Baker Aitken and Anne Hopkins Aitken

Robert Aitken or Bob, as he liked to be called, was born to Robert Thomas Aitken and Gladys Page Baker in Philadelphia, Pennsylvania, in 1917. He was raised in Hawaii from the age of five. He was the son of a war enthusiast and was a rebel and loner in the 1930s and 40s before the war.

Living in Guam as a civilian working in construction—at the onset of World War II—he was detained by the Japanese and held in internment camps for the duration of the war. A guard at one of the internment camps let him borrow a copy of R.H. Blyth's book Zen in English Literature and the Oriental Classics. In one of his books later on in his life, he described being so invested in the book that he managed to be joyful even in the terrible conditions. In another internment camp in Kobe, Japan, in 1944 he met its author, Reginald Horace Blyth, with whom he had frequent discussions on Zen Buddhism and anarchism. At the conclusion of the war he returned to Hawaii and obtained a B.A. in English literature and an MA in Japanese from the University of Hawaii. He would write for two hours each morning and even read aloud his work to make sure it was his distinctive style.

In the late 1940s, while briefly attending classes at the University of California, Berkeley, he met Nyogen Senzaki. Originally in California hoping for an encounter with Krishnamurti, he began to study with Senzaki in Los Angeles. During this period he became more vocal about his commitment to leftist social issues such as pacifism and labor rights. He was investigated by the FBI as a result of his advocacy work. Aitken decided to not pay the portion of his taxes that went to the Defense Department of the U.S. because he opposed the war in Vietnam and arming the military.

In 1950, Aitken returned to Japan, under a grant to study haiku and followed Senzaki's recommendation that he study Zen. There he took part in his first sesshin at Engaku-ji, a temple in Kamakura, Japan. Soon after, he met Nakagawa Soen, who persuaded him to come for a stay at Ryutakuji for the next seven months. During this period Soen took over for the ailing abbot of the temple, Yamamoto Gempo. Aitken then developed dysentery, and returned home to Hawaii. He married his second wife Anne Hopkins in 1957 and made occasional trips back to Japan. In 1957 Aitken met Hakuun Yasutani and sat with him for the first time.

In 1959 he and Anne began a meditation group in Honolulu at their residence, which became known as the Koko-an zendo. The community that gathered at this zendo were then named the Diamond Sangha by the two. The Diamond Sangha has affiliate zen centers in South America, Australia, New Zealand, the United States and Europe and is known for making the rigors of traditional Zen accessible to lay practitioners.

In 1960 Soen Nakagawa Roshi asked young monk Eido Tai Shimano to travel to Honolulu to assist at the Diamond Sangha center.

In 1961, Aitken made an extended stay in Japan to study under Haku'un Yasutani, eventually ending his studies with Soen. He then worked in various capacities at the East-West Center and the University of Hawaii until 1969, when he and Anne moved to Maui, Hawaii, to found the Maui Zendo in Haiku-Pauwela. Koun Yamada Rōshi was invited to lead the Diamond Sangha and he moved to Hawaii in 1971. In 1974 Aitken was given permission to teach by Koun Yamada, receiving full Dharma transmission from him in 1985.

He also was a major inspiration for the ‘System Stinks’ movement, where they drew inspiration from his famous photograph protesting with a sign. In the picture the sign said 'The System Stinks' and was in protest of the Iraq War, while in his wheelchair. The photo was taken in Hawaii.

Robert Aitken was a social activist through much of his adult life, beginning with protesting against nuclear testing during the 1940s. He was an outspoken critic of the Vietnam War, and became a strong opponent of the nuclear arms race between the United States and the Soviet Union. He was among the earlier proponents of deep ecology in religious America, and was outspoken in his beliefs on the equality of men and women. In 1978 Aitken helped found the Buddhist Peace Fellowship, an organization that advocates conflict resolution globally. In the discussion that led to the founding of the Buddhist Peace Fellowship, most of the other people had less experience than him when it came to political activism. This gave him the most influence on what the organization should be about. Many of the first 100 people who were sent invitations to join were recommendations from Robert Aitken. He was also the guest speaker at the first two institutes that the Buddhist Peace Fellowship held. He did have anarchist beliefs, which is why even when he helped found the organization, he didn't take any control due to distrusting all authority or control even when it was his own.

Aitken Roshi retired in 1996 and spent some of his final years in Palolo, Hawaii, where he could be looked after and interact with some of his students. He died after a brief bout with pneumonia on August 5, 2010, in Honolulu, Hawaii. He was working on his fourteenth book before his passing.

== Bibliography ==
- Zen Training. A Personal Account; Honolulu: Old Island Books (1960).
- A Buddhist Reader; Honolulu: Young Buddhist Association (1961).
- Hawaii Upward Bound Writing and Art 1966; A Project of the Office of Economic Opportunity. Robert Aitken, Editor (1966).
- A Zen Wave: Basho's Haiku and Zen; New York: Weatherhill (1978). ISBN 0-8348-0137-X
- Taking the Path of Zen; San Francisco: North Point Press (1982). ISBN 0-86547-080-4.
- The Mind of Clover: Essays in Zen Buddhist Ethics; San Francisco: North Point Press (1984). ISBN 0-86547-158-4.
- The Gateless Barrier: The Wu-menkuan (Mumonkan); San Francisco: North Point Press (1990). ISBN 0-86547-442-7.
- The Dragon who Never Sleeps: Verses for Zen Buddhist Practice; Berkeley: Parallax Press (1992). ISBN 0-938077-60-0.
- Encouraging Words: Zen Buddhist Teachings for Western Students; San Francisco and New York: Pantheon Books (1993). ISBN 0-679-75652-3.
- The Ground We Share: Everyday Practice. Buddhist and Christian with David Steindl-Rast; Ligouri, Missouri: Triumph Books, (1994). ISBN 0-89243-644-1.
- The Practice of Perfection: The Paramitas from a Zen Buddhist Perspective; San Francisco and New York: Pantheon Books (1994). ISBN 0-679-43510-7.
- Original Dwelling Place: Zen Buddhist Essays; Washington, DC: Counterpoint Press (1996). ISBN 1-887178-16-3.
- Zen Master Raven: Sayings and Doings of a Wise Bird; Boston: Tuttle Publishing (2002). ISBN 0-8048-3473-3
- A Zen Master: Counterpoint 2008 ISBN 978-1-58243-536-7

== See also ==
- Buddhism in the United States
- Buddhism in the West
- Buddhist Peace Fellowship
- Engaged Buddhism
- List of peace activists
- Timeline of Zen Buddhism in the United States
