= Ruben Habito =

Filipino Zen of the Sanbō Kyōdan lineage (born 1947)

Rubén L. F. Hábito
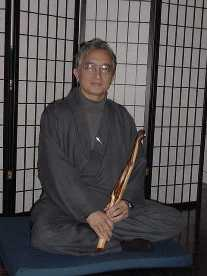
- Title: Rōshi

Personal life
- Born: c. 1947 Philippines
- Education: Ateneo de Manila University; Sophia University; University of Tokyo

Religious life
- Religion: Zen Buddhism; Catholic Church
- School: Sanbo Kyodan
- Lineage: Harada-Yasutani
- Initiation: 1988 by Yamada Koun

Senior posting
- Teacher: Yamada Koun
- Based in: Maria Kannon Zen Center
- Website: www.mkzc.org

Rubén L. F. Hábito (born c. 1947) is a Filipino Zen rōshi of the Sanbō Kyōdan lineage.

== Biography ==
Hábito started out as a Jesuit priest doing missionary work in Japan. There, he began practising under Yamada Kōun, a Zen rōshi who taught Christian students, which was unusual for the time. In 1988, Hábito received dharma transmission from Yamada. Ruben subsequently left the Jesuit order in 1989, and in 1991 founded the Maria Kannon Zen Center, a lay organization in Dallas, Texas.

Hábito has been a faculty member of the Perkins School of Theology at the Southern Methodist University since 1989. He is married and has two sons.

== Bibliography ==
- Habito, Ruben L. F. (2006). Total Liberation: Zen Spirituality and the Social Dimension. Wipf & Stock Publishers. ISBN 1-5975-2899-4.
- Habito, Ruben L. F. (2006). Healing Breath: Zen for Christians and Buddhists in a Wounded World. Wisdom Publications. ISBN 0-8617-1508-X.
- Habito, Ruben L. F. (1995). Living Zen, Loving God. Wisdom Publications. ISBN 0-8617-1383-4.
- Habito, Ruben L. F. (2005). Experiencing Buddhism: Ways Of Wisdom And Compassion. Orbis Books. ISBN 1-5707-5584-1.
- Habito, Ruben L. F.; Keishin Inaba (2006). The Practice of Altruism: Caring and Religion in Global Perspective. Cambridge Scholars Publishing. ISBN 1-9043-0395-1.

== See also ==
- Timeline of Zen Buddhism in the United States
