= Harada Daiun Sogaku =

Japanese Buddhist monk

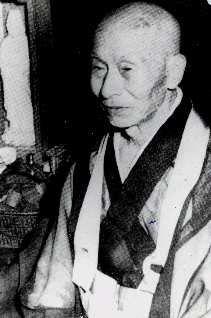
- Title: Rōshi

Personal life
- Born: October 13, 1871 Obama, Japan
- Died: December 12, 1961 (aged 90)
- Education: Komazawa University

Religious life
- Religion: Zen Buddhism
- School: Sōtō

Senior posting
- Successor: Hakuun Yasutani Harada Tangen

Daiun Sogaku Harada (原田 大雲祖岳, Harada Daiun Sogaku; October 13, 1871 – December 12, 1961) was a Sōtō Zen monk who trained under both Sōtō and Rinzai teachers. He became known for his teaching combining methods from both schools. The Harada–Yasutani zen lineage founded by his disciple Hakuun Yasutani has become one of the major Zen traditions in the West. He is known as the "Great Cloud".

== Biography ==
Born in an area known today as Obama, Fukui Prefecture, he entered a Sōtō temple as a novice at age 7 and continued training in temples during his primary and high school years. Haunted by existential questions, at age 20 he entered Shogen-ji, a well-known Rinzai monastery; it is reported that he experienced kensho after two and half years there. In 1901 he graduated from Komazawa University (then Sōtō-shu Daigakurin), the Sōtō university.

He eventually studied under various Sōtō-priests such as Harada Sodo Kakusho, Oka Sotan, Akino Kodo, Adachi Tatsujun, Hoshimi Tenkai, and Rinzai-priests such as Unmuken Taigi Sogon and Kogenshitsu Dokutan Sosan, with whom he completed koan-study. From the years of 1911 to 1923, Harada held a professor position at Soto-shu Daigakurin.

A very strict disciplinarian, he served as abbot at various Sōtō temples throughout Japan: Hosshin-ji, Chisai-in, Bukkoku-ji, Sōji-ji and Chigen-ji. Until almost age 90, he conducted week-long sesshin at Hosshin-ji 6 times a year; he also held sesshin elsewhere.

Harada Roshi's teaching integrated the Rinzai use of Kōan, a practice which was abolished in the Sōtō-school in the 19th century under influence of Gento Sokuchu (1729–1807). He also departed from the Sōtō conventions of his day by training lay persons with monks rather than separately.

A well-known heir in the West is Hakuun Yasutani Rōshi, a Sōtō monk who he also trained in koan study. This led ultimately to the spread of combined Sōtō and Rinzai methods by the Sanbo Kyodan (today Sanbo-Zen International), Zen-community founded by Yasutani which became influential in the West. Harada himself, however, remained within the Sōtō sect. It is often claimed in the West that he received Rinzai inka shomei (dharma transmission) from Dokutan Rōshi; he didn't, as he didn't want to leave the Soto-sect. (Note: James Ford, The Great Cloud Dies: Recalling Zen Master Daiun Sogaku Harada: "There is debate within the Zen community as to whether he [Daiun Sogaku Harada] actually received dharma transmission from Dokutan Roshi. I was told by Maezumi Roshi that while Dokutan Roshi considered Harada Roshi to have completed all necessary training with him to be an independent master of the koan way, there was no formal transmission. In that time and place such a formal recognition would have also had Harada leave the Soto school, something that he had no desire to do." * Barry Kaigen McMahon, The Evolution of the White Plum. A short and incomplete history of its founders and their practice: "Maezumi Roshi told Mr. Yu Ohgushi, a Hannya Dojo roommate of mine and frequent visitor to ZCLA, that it was indeed doubtful if Harada ever actually received or accepted dharma transmission from Dokutan Sosan. The reason being that Harada had already received transmission in the Soto school and it would have been religiously/politically incorrect to get it in the Rinzai school at that time. As Maezumi Roshi did receive dharma transmission from Koryu Roshi perhaps it had become a non-issue after the war.")

Harada Rōshi may be viewed as an eclectically talented Sōtō teacher who did not abide by sectarian boundaries in regard to practice method.

== Criticism ==
Harada has been criticized for his support of the Japanese War-endeavors. A famous quote from Harada, cited in Zen at War, is:

[If ordered to] march: tramp, tramp, or shoot: bang, bang. This is the manifestation of the highest Wisdom [of Enlightenment]. The unity of Zen and war of which I speak extends to the farthest reaches of the holy war [now under way].

== Dharma heirs ==
Dharma-heirs from Harada Roshi are:

- Hakuun Yasutani Rōshi, founder of Sanbo Kyodan
- Harada Tangen Rōshi Head of Bukkoku-ji temple;
- Ban Tetsugyu Soin Rōshi, Head of Tosho-ji temple in Tokyo;
- Watanabe Genshu, Head of Soji-ji temple among others.
- Sozen Nagasawa Rōshi, established Kannon-ji temple.

== See also ==
- Buddhism in Japan

== Sources ==
- Heine, Steven; Wright, Dale S. (2000). The Koan: Texts and Contexts in Zen Buddhism. Oxford University Press. ISBN 0-19-511748-4. OCLC 41090651.
- Tiltenberg (2002), Zen Without Dirty Hands? Report from a seminar and retreat at De Tiltenberg, Vogelenzang in the Netherlands July 17–22, 2001, Couste Que Couste, ISBN 90-807042-3-7
- Victoria, Brian Daizen (2006), Zen at war (Second ed.), Lanham e.a.: Rowman & Littlefield Publishers, Inc.
