= Brian Victoria =

American educator (born 1939)

Brian Andre Victoria (born 1939), also known as Brian Daizen Victoria, is an American educator, Doctor of Philosophy, writer and Buddhist priest in the Sōtō Zen sect. He has published numerous works on the relationship of religion to violence, with a focus on the relationship between Buddhism and Japanese militarism around World War II.

== Education ==
Victoria is a native of Omaha, Nebraska. He graduated in 1961 from Nebraska Wesleyan University in Lincoln, Nebraska. He trained at the Sōtō Zen monastery of Eihei-ji and holds a M.A. in Buddhist Studies from the Sōtō Zen–affiliated Komazawa University in Tokyo. He received his Ph.D. from the Department of Religious Studies at Temple University.

== Vietnam era ==
Victoria was a war protester during the Vietnam War, specifically as a conscientious objector.

In a 2016 interview, he explained how his views were influenced by his time studying in Europe in 1959–60. During a visit to Germany, he saw the lingering effects of World War II, including a bombed church in Hanover displaying photographs of Nazi soldiers with the inscription “forgotten country”. This experience led him to question the relationship between religion and warfare.

"Underneath their photographs ‘forgotten country’ was written, and I wondered to myself, how could these Nazi soldiers have believed that what they were doing for Hitler was for God, perhaps for their country, but how could they have believed that it was for God? It was toward the evening and I sat in the main chapel, as I said it was open to the sky and I sat on a piece of broken concrete, which probably was at one time the roof of the church. And I was contemplating, trying to figure out, what was I going to do when I returned to the US, because it was time for me to sign up for the draft. Unusually for our country it was not at war at the time, it was in-between the Korean War and what, of course, became the Vietnam War. So it wasn’t the case of a particular war, but the question was, would I be willing to kill my fellow human beings on behalf of the officers in charge of me if I were to be drafted? And as I sat there I came to the conclusion that no, I couldn’t do that, or I wouldn’t do that. "

Upon returning to the United States, these reflections contributed to his decision to formally declare himself a conscientious objector, believing he could not participate in armed conflict. As a member of the Methodist Church, he received support in making this decision based on personal conscience.

Seeking an alternative to military service, Victoria moved to Japan in 1961 as a short-term missionary. While there, he became involved in anti-war efforts, including counseling U.S. military personnel stationed at Yokosuka Naval Base who opposed the Vietnam War. It was during this time in Japan, he encountered works on Zen Buddhism. His activism eventually led to legal challenges, and his deportation from Japan, after which he continued advocating for pacifism and human rights.

== Affiliation ==
Victoria has taught Japanese language and culture at the University of Nebraska at Omaha, Creighton University, and Bucknell University in the United States and lectured in the Department of Asian Languages and Literatures at the University of Auckland. He was a senior lecturer in the Centre in Asian Studies at the University of Adelaide in South Australia. He has also been Yehan Numata Distinguished Visiting Professor, Buddhist Studies at the University of Hawaiʻi at Mānoa in Honolulu.

From 2005 to 2013, he was a professor of Japanese studies and director of the Antioch Education Abroad “Japan and Its Buddhist Traditions Program” at Antioch University in Yellow Springs, OH. Since 2013, he is a Fellow at the Oxford Centre for Buddhist Studies at the University of Oxford and a visiting research fellow at the International Research Center for Japanese Studies in Kyoto.

== Zen at War ==
First published in 1997, Zen at War is based on the work of Japanese scholars and Victoria's own studies of original Japanese documents. It describes the influence of state policy on Japanese Buddhism before and during WWII and conversely the influence of Zen philosophy on the Japanese military. The book has been hailed as a major contribution to a previously unexamined aspect of Japanese religious history, and criticized for imposing anachronistic values when evaluating the words and deeds of the time. The work was followed by others exploring the same theme, such as Zen Terror in Prewar Japan (2020).

== Other works ==
Brian Victoria also wrote articles concerning Buddhism at wartime in Japan for The Asia-Pacific Journal.

He offered a critical perspective on the self-proclaimed pacifism of certain figures in Buddhism.

D.T. Suzuki

He highlighted D.T. Suzuki’s relationship to Japanese fascism, not without triggering a lively controversy.

Tsunesaburo Makiguchi

In a 2014 study about Tsunesaburo Makiguchi, he asserted that the founder of the Soka Gakkai organization was not the anti-war zealot described by the Soka Gakkai today. Victoria takes as its starting point Daisaku Ikeda's account of his predecessor's life, which presents him as a defender of democracy, an opponent of imperial power, a pacifist who refused to recant under torture and died in prison for his ideas. Analyzing Makiguchi's writings - but also misinterpreting some of it, his critics said - he shows that Makiguchi was defending his own Nichiren buddhism belief, but could not be considered as a political or religious dissident.

Victoria's analysis of Makiguchi's "putative pacifism" triggered some criticism from professors linked to the Soka Gakkai.

== Criticisms ==
There are a number of criticisms directed at Victoria's methodology in critiquing a number of individuals. Most prominently in "Zen at War", but also in subsequent articles. The criticisms have focused on Victoria's portrayals of D.T. Suzuki, Kodo Sawaki, and Tsunesaburo Makiguchi.

Koichi Miyata, professor at the Soka University in Tokyo, then Dayle M. Bethel, fellow traveller of the Soka Gakkai and a specialist of Makiguchi's philosophy, teaching at The International University Learning Center (Kyoto), contradicted Victoria's work and pointed out the limitations of his analytical methods. Daniel A. Metraux, Professor of Asian Studies at Mary Baldwin College in Staunton (Virginia), and uncritical historian of the Soka Gakkai, denounced "Victoria's Flawed Portrayal of Makiguchi", thus defending Makiguchi's image as a "martyr for the Soka Gakkai movement". "If Makiguchi is guilty as Victoria charges, much of the historical raison d’être of the Soka Gakkai would be severely undercut", writes Metraux, adding that Makiguchi "went to prison not necessarily for anti-war beliefs, which the Soka Gakkai preaches today, but because it was against (his) deeply felt religious principles to adopt Shinto practices".

== Works ==
=== Books ===
- 外人であり、禅坊主であり… [As a Foreigner, As a Zen Priest] (in Japanese). San-ichi Shobo. 1971. ASIN B000J9HRNK.
- Zen Master Dogen: An Introduction with Selected Writings. Weatherhill. 1976. ISBN 978-0834801165. (With Yuhō Yokoi)
- Zen at War (2nd ed.). Rowman & Littlefield Publishers, Inc. 2006. ISBN 978-0742539266.
- Zen War Stories. Routledge. 2012. ISBN 978-0700715800.
- Zen Terror in Prewar Japan: Portrait of an Assassin. Rowman & Littlefield Publishers, Inc. 2020. ISBN 978-1538131664.

=== Articles ===
- "When God(s) and Buddhas Go to War." In War and State Terrorism: The United States, Japan, and the Asia-Pacific in the Long Twentieth Century. Edited by Mark Selden and Alvin Y. So. 2003. Rowman & Littlefield Publishers. pages 91–118. ISBN 978-0742523913
- "'War is a Crime': Takenaka Shōgen and Buddhist Resistance in the Asia-Pacific War and Today". The Asia-Pacific Journal, Volume 12, Issue 37, Number 4, September 15, 2014. (With Muneo Narusawa)
- "Sōka Gakkai Founder, Makiguchi Tsunesaburō, A Man of Peace?". The Asia-Pacific Journal, Volume 12, Issue 37, Number 3, September 15, 2014.
- "Zen Masters on the Battlefield (Part II)". The Asia-Pacific Journal, Volume 11, Issue 27, Number 4, July 7, 2014.
- "Zen Masters on the Battlefield (Part I)". The Asia-Pacific Journal, Volume 11, Issue 24, Number 3, June 16, 2014.
- "A Zen Nazi in Wartime Japan: Count Dürckheim and his Sources—D.T. Suzuki, Yasutani Haku’un and Eugen Herrigel". The Asia-Pacific Journal, Vol. 12, Issue 3, No. 2, January 20, 2014.
- "D.T. Suzuki, Zen and the Nazis". The Asia-Pacific Journal, Volume 11, Issue 43, Number 4, October 28, 2013.
- "Zen as a Cult of Death in the Wartime Writings of D.T. Suzuki". The Asia-Pacific Journal, Volume 11, Issue 30, Number 4, August 5, 2013.
- "Buddhism and Disasters: From World War II to Fukushima". The Asia-Pacific Journal, n.d.
- "Karma, War and Inequality in Twentieth Century Japan". The Asia-Pacific Journal, n.d.

== Critical works ==
- Daniel A. Metraux, "A Critical Analysis of Brian Victoria's Perspectives on Modern Japanese Buddhist History" (Journal of Global Buddhism, ISSN 1527-6457)
- Miyata, Koichi, "Critical Comments on Brian Victoria's 'Engaged Buddhism: A Skeleton in the Closet?'" (Journal of Global Buddhism (vol. 3, 2002), pp. 79–85)
