= Yamada Koun =

Japanese Zen master (1907–1989)

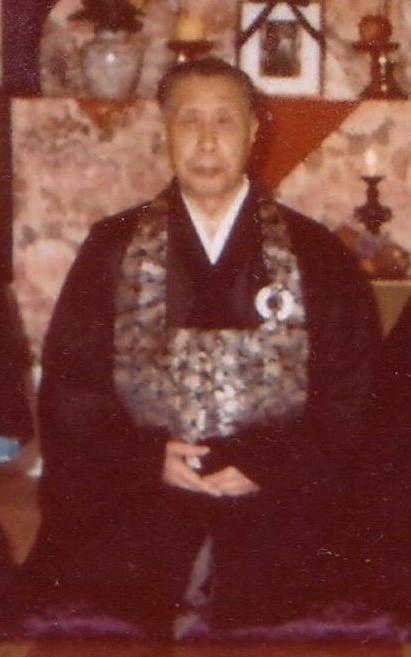
- Title: Roshi

Personal life
- Born: 1907 Nihonmatsu, Japan
- Died: 1989 (aged 81–82) Kamakura, Japan
- Partner: Yamada Kazue Myo-en
- Children: Masamichi Ryoun-ken Yamada

Religious life
- Religion: Zen Buddhism
- School: Sanbo Kyodan

Senior posting
- Teacher: Asahina Sōgen; Hanamoto Kanzui; Harada Daiun Sogaku; Yasutani Haku'un Ryoko
- Predecessor: Yasutani Haku'un Ryoko

Yamada Koun Zenshin (山田 耕雲, Yamada Kōun; 1907—1989), or Koun Yamada, was a Japanese Buddhist who was the leader of the Sanbo Kyodan lineage of Zen Buddhism, the Dharma heir of his teacher Yasutani Haku'un Ryoko. Yamada was appointed the leader of the Sanbo Kyodan in 1967, 1970 or 1973 and continued to differentiate the lineage from other Japanese Zen traditions by deemphasising the separation between laypeople and the ordained—just as his teacher Yasutani had done. Yamada was also instrumental in bringing Christians to the practice of Zen that “by the end of Yamada’s teaching career approximately one quarter of the participants at his sesshins were Christians.”

== Biography ==
=== Early career ===
Yamada Koun was born Yamada Kiozo in Nihonmatsu in Fukushima prefecture of Japan in 1907. He attended school with Soen Nakagawa at Dai-Ichi High School located in Tokyo, Japan, and also went to university with him. In 1941 Yamada began working as a labor supervisor for the Manchurian Mining Company—a company known for poor working conditions and exploiting its slave labor forces composed of Chinese peasants, POWs and criminals. By 1945 he had become deputy director of the General Affairs Department for the company.

While working as supervisor for the company his old friend Soen Nakagawa came to the Mining Company's headquarters in Xinjing (modern-day Changchun, Jilin) on behalf of his master, Gempo Yamamoto, in an effort to encourage workers to double their output for Japan's war efforts.

=== Zen training ===
According to the foreword in the book The Gateless Gate: The Classic Book of Zen Koans,

In Manchuria at age thirty-eight Yamada began Zen training. Three years later he returned to Japan and settled in Kamakura with his wife and three children. Once set on his course in Zen, Yamada pursued his goal relentlessly. Although he was a managing director of a large Tokyo firm, he went twice a day to dokusan with Asahina Sōgen Roshi. After his first kensho was approved, he engaged in koan study for three years and then continued his studies with Hanamoto Kanzui.

In 1953 Yamada invited Haku'un Yasutani to Kamakura and founded the Kamakura Haku-un-kai. Then, according to Stephen Batchelor,

On 26 November 1953, Koun Yamada, a Japanese business executive in Kamakura, was returning home with his wife on a suburban train. He came across a passage in a Zen text in which the author declared: 'I came to realise clearly that Mind is no other than mountains and rivers and the great wide earth, the sun and the moon and the stars.' He broke into tears with the realization that after eight years of zazen he had finally grasped what this statement meant.

Later that night he awoke abruptly from sleep and saw the same passage flash in his mind, which was followed by a kensho experience. The next day Yasutani confirmed that what Yamada had experienced was a kensho.

=== Sanbo Kyodan succession ===
Yamada continued to study under Yasutani for seven years following this experience, and in 1961 he became the successor to Haku'un Yasutani—one year after completing some six hundred koans under him. There is some confusion over the date on which Yamada became the leader of the Sanbo Kyodan:

- According to Daizen Victoria in Zen War Stories, "In 1967 Yamada succeeded to the leadership of the Sanbō-Kyōdan (Three Treasures Association), an independent, lay-oriented Zen sect that Yasutani had created in Kamakura in 1953."
- According to the book The Sound of Liberating Truth, "In 1970 Yamada Kōun became the successor of Yasutani Roshi as head (kanchō) of the Sanbōkyōdan."
- Finally, according to Michelle Spuler in the book Developments in Australian Buddhism, "Yasutani's successor, Yamada Koun Zenshin (1907-1989), was appointed as the leader of the Sanbo Kyodan in 1973."

The date is most likely 1973, however, as Charles S. Prebish writes in his book Luminous Passage: The Practice and Study of Buddhism in America,

With the blessing of both Nakagawa Sōen Rōshi and Yasutani Rōshi, Koun Yamada Rōshi was invited to lead the Diamond Sangha, and he moved to Hawaii in 1971.

It is likely the date is not 1967 or 1970 because Yamada would not need anyone's blessing to go to Hawaii were he already the head of the school, not to mention 1973 was the year of Haku'un Yasutani's death.

== List of Dharma heirs ==
- Robert Chotan Gyoun Aitken (Note: Yamada made Robert Baker Aitken either a sensei or roshi in 1974. Even this date comes with some confusion, as author Richard Seager says he received Dharma transmission in 1974. However, the author David W. Chappell states in the book Buddhist Peacework: Creating Cultures of Peace, "...in 1974 [Aitken] was appointed sensei (teacher) by Kamakura-based Zen master Yamada Koun Roshi. In 1985, Yamada Roshi gave Aitken transmission as an independent roshi". Kyosho newsletter no. 230 (1991) states, "...received full transmission as a master from Yamada Koun Roshi in 1985.")
- Niklaus Brantschen
- Ruben Keiun-ken Habito
- Willigis Jäger
- Johannes Kopp
- Akira Kubota
- Victor Löw
- Elaine MacInnes
- Gundula Meyer
- Ama Samy
- Ana Maria Schlüter
- Roselyn Stone
- Masamichi Ryoun-ken Yamada

== Bibliography ==
- Yamada, Koun (2004). The Gateless Gate: The Classic Book of Zen Koans. Wisdom Publications. ISBN 0-86171-382-6.
- Zen: The Authentic Gate. Wisdom Publications 2015, ISBN 978-1-61429-250-0.

== See also ==
- Buddhism in Japan
- Buddhism in the United States
- Timeline of Zen Buddhism in the United States
- Hakuun Yasutani Lineage Chart

== Sources ==
- Aitken, Robert (1990). Remembering Yamada Kōun Rōshi, The Eastern Buddhist, New Series 23 (1), 152-154
- Batchelor, Stephen (1994). The Awakening of the West: The Encounter of Buddhism and Western Culture. Parallax Press. ISBN 0-938077-69-4. OCLC 30078996.
- Chappell, David W. (2000). Buddhist Peacework: Creating Cultures of Peace. Wisdom Publications. ISBN 0-86171-167-X.
- Habito, Ruben L. F. (1990). In Memoriam: Yamada Kōun Rōshi (1907-1989, Buddhist-Christian Studies 10, 231-237
- King, Sallie B.; Paul O. Ingram (1999). The Sound of Liberating Truth: Buddhist-Christian Dialogues in Honor of Frederick J. Streng. Routledge. ISBN 0-7007-1121-X. OCLC 50518756.
- Prebish, Charles S (1999). Luminous Passage: The Practice and Study of Buddhism in America. University of California Press. ISBN 0-520-21697-0.
- Seager, Richard Hughes (1999). Buddhism In America. Columbia University Press. ISBN 0-231-10868-0. OCLC 40481142.
- Spuler, Michelle (2003). Developments in Australian Buddhism: Facets of the Diamond. Routledge. ISBN 0-7007-1582-7. OCLC 49952207.
- Victoria, Daizen (2003). Zen War Stories. Routledge. ISBN 0-7007-1580-0. OCLC 50518582.
- Yamada, Koun (2004). The Gateless Gate: The Classic Book of Zen Koans. Wisdom Publications. ISBN 0-86171-382-6.
