= Sanbo Kyodan =

Lay Zen school

Sanbo-Zen International
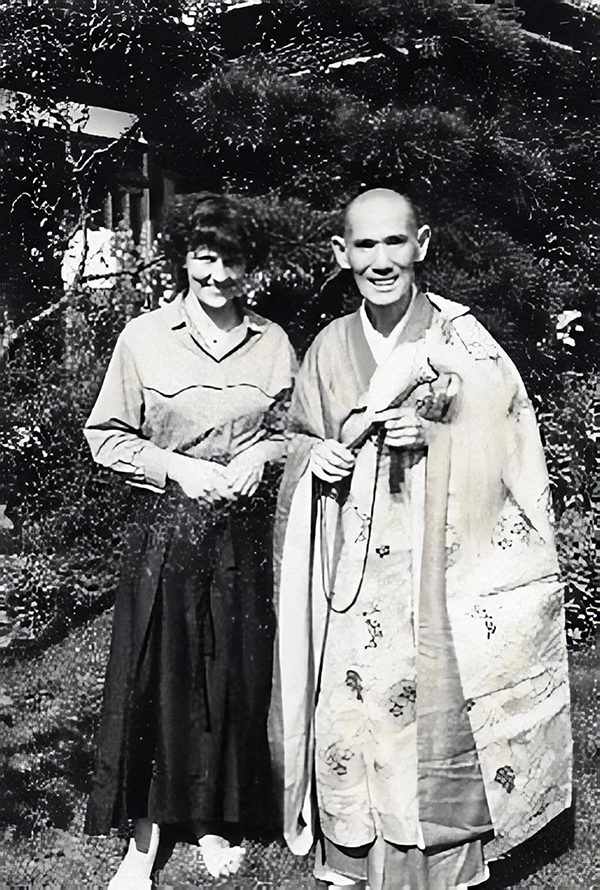
- Hakuun Yasutani (right)
- Formation: 1954
- Type: Zen
- Headquarters: (Japan) Kamakura, Kanagawa
- Website: ssl.sanbo-zen.org

Sanbo Kyodan (三宝教団, Sanbō Kyōdan; literally "Three Treasures Religious Organization") is a lay Zen school derived from both the Soto (Caodong) and the Rinzai (Linji) traditions. It was renamed Sanbo-Zen International in 2014. The term Sanbo Kyodan has often been used to refer to the Harada-Yasutani School. However, a number of Yasutani's students have started their own teaching lines that are independent from Sanbo Kyodan. Strictly speaking, Sanbo Kyodan refers only to the organization that is now known as Sanbo-Zen International.

== History ==
Sanbō Kyōdan was founded by Hakuun Yasutani in 1954, when he "finally gave up his membership in the Sōtō School and professed himself to be connected directly to Dōgen Zenji." (Note: Joan Rieck and Henry Shukman, Sanbō (Three Treasures) Zen) It is also called the "Harada-Yasutani School," in reference to Yasutani's teacher Harada Daiun Sogaku, a Sōtō priest who also studied with Rinzai priests. (Note: Some details of the background and early history of Sanbo Zen can be found in a paper delivered at a Buddhist conference in Tiantong Temple, China in 2014.) Both Harada Roshi and Yasutani Roshi were strong promoters of Zen practice for lay practitioners, and for people of other (non-Buddhist, non-Asian) faith communities and cultures. Their openness to lay practitioners was in line with the modernizing tendency of the Meiji Restoration, which began in 1868. Starting in this period, various Zen institutions began to give permission to lay followers to practice Zen. (Note: Another example of this openness to lay practitioners is the Ningen Zen Kyodan.)

The leaders of the Sanbo Kyodan were involved in the contemporary social and cultural developments in Japan, which followed the abandonment of the medieval feudal system and its opening up to foreign influences and modern western technology and culture. The association of some of them with the fierce militaristic nationalism of the mid-20th century Empire of Japan has become controversial. Among Yamada Koun's friends and associates were Soen Nakagawa, a strong supporter of Japanese imperialism, and Yasutani Roshi's own position has been the subject of arguments. Within Japanese Buddhism, there was a development of Buddhist modernism, but also a tendency to support the autocratic regime in the interest of survival.

== Influence ==
=== Western influence ===
Although the membership of Sanbō Kyōdan is small (3,790 registered followers and 24 instructors in 1988), "the Sanbō Kyōdan has had an inordinate influence on Zen in the West".

Westerners involved with Sanbō Kyōdan, including a number of Roman Catholics, promoted its teachings in North America and Europe in the latter half of the 20th century and early 21st century. One early American Zen member was Philip Kapleau, who published The Three Pillars of Zen, a work of compilation which was largely constructed by Yamada Koun, with help from Kubota Jiun, who together provided rough translations that were later polished by Philip Kapleau, who also wrote some introductions to sections. The three men together edited the book, which appeared in 1965 under Kapleau's name. Kapleau studied under Harada Sōgaku in Obama and Yasutani Haku'un in greater Tokyo in the 1950s and 1960s, but never received formal dharma transmission, and started his own lineage. Other influential teachers who studied with Yasutani and started their own organizations included Taizan Maezumi and Robert Baker Aitken, although most of Aitken's training was under Koun Yamada. In Europe, the Sanbō Kyōdan was associated particularly with Roman Catholic practitioners such as Hugo Enomiya-Lassalle and others.

Yasutani's lineage has grown rapidly, constituting one of the largest Zen networks in the United States, although some of Yasutani's disciples, and disciples of his successor Yamada Koun, have left the Sanbo Kyodan and started their own organisations.

=== Charismatic authority ===
The Sanbō Kyōdan was also influential in introducing charismatic authority in Western Zen, by its dependency on the authority of Yasutani, while simultaneously standing outside the mainstream of Japanese Zen. It was transplanted into a culture that is unaware of the specific characteristics of Japanese culture regarding authority. The stress on kenshō as means of authority, coupled to the primacy of maintaining the correct dharma transmission, led to institutional problems when Yasutani's heir Yamada Koun died, in the view of some disaffected former members. Shortly before his death in 1989 Yamada Koun passed on the leadership of the Sanbo Kyodan directly to Kubota Jiun Roshi, who was its abbot until 2004, whereupon the abbacy passed to Yamada Ryoun Roshi. While a handful of Western teachers authorized by Sanbo-Zen left the organization, some 40 or so remain within it, and the institution itself has evolved and shows signs of growing strength and resilience. The direct lineage of the “Three Clouds” (Harada, Yasutani and Yamada) maintains a strong core and trunk in today's Sanbo-Zen. Seeing one's nature gives an autonomous confirmation of Zen's ultimate truth, which may conflict with the need to maintain institutions and traditions. (Note: See Sharf (1995, pp. 444–452) for an exposition of the problems that the Sanbo Kyodan faced, after the death of Yamada Koun. As Sharf notes: "[C]harisma can spread too widely, and the resulting centripetal forces pull the organisation apart, with new sects spinning off in several directions".; "[T]he Sanbō Kyōdan would not survive long were it to elevate every student with kensho to the status of master".; "The institution would have little chance of survival were it not to balance claims concerning the ultimacy and autonomy of kensho with a course of training that inspires obedience and loyalty to the tradition".; These remarks also seem to apply to USA-zen, which lacks central authority, despite the formal ties to Soto-shu of many groups.) On the other hand, it may foster a renewal and revitalization of the core of Zen teaching, and allow for styles of Zen practice to emerge that are more relevant to non-Japanese contexts.

== Yasutani and Japanese imperialism ==
Yasutani's support for the Pacific War was criticized after World War II. The publication of Brian Victoria's Zen at War led to a public apology by Kubota Jiun, the third Abbot of Sanbō Kyōdan. (Note: Apology for What the Founder of the Sanbo Kyodan, Yasutani Haku'un Roshi, Said and Did During World War II)

== See also ==
- Buddhism in the United States

== Sources ==
=== Printed sources ===
- Ford, James Ishmael (2006). Zen Master Who?: A Guide to the People and Stories of Zen. Wisdom Publications. ISBN 0-86171-509-8.
- Lachs, Stuart (1999), Means of Authorization: Establishing Hierarchy in Ch'an /Zen Buddhism in America
- Lachs, Stuart (2006), The Zen Master in America: Dressing the Donkey with Bells and Scarves
- K., Vladimir; Lachs, Stuart (2009), The Aitken-Shimano Letters
- McMahan, David L. (2008), The Making of Buddhist Modernism, Oxford University Press, ISBN 9780195183276
- Prebish, Charles S. (1999). Luminous Passage: The Practice and Study of Buddhism in America. University of California Press. ISBN 9780520216976.
- Sato, Kemmyō Taira (2008), D.T. Suzuki and the Question of War (PDF)The Eastern Buddhist 39/1: 61–120
- Seager, Richard Hughes (2000). Buddhism in America. Columbia University Press. ISBN 0-231-10868-0.
- Sharf, Robert H. (August 1993), "The Zen of Japanese Nationalism", History of Religions, 33 (1): 1–43, doi:10.1086/463354, S2CID 161535877
- Sharf, Robert H. (1995), "Sanbokyodan. Zen and the Way of the New Religions" (PDF), Japanese Journal of Religious Studies, 22 (3–4), doi:10.18874/jjrs.22.3-4.1995.417-458
- Shimano, Eido Tai (1996), "Dai Bosatsu Mandala. A Portrait of Soen Nakagawa". In: Kazuaki Tanahashi & Roko Sherry Chayat (1996), "Endless Vow. The Zen Path of Soen Nakagawa", Boston, Massachusetts: Shambhala Publications, Inc.
- Spuler, Michelle (2002). Developments in Australian Buddhism: Facets of the Diamond. Routledge. ISBN 0-7007-1582-7.
- Victoria, Brian (2003), Zen War Stories, Routledge
- Victoria, Brian Daizen (2006), Zen at war (Second ed.), Lanham e.a.: Rowman & Littlefield Publishers, Inc.
- Yamada, Koun (2004), The Gateless Gate, Wisdom Publications, ISBN 978-0-86171-382-0
- Yamada, Koun (2015), Zen: The Authentic Gate, Wisdom Publications, ISBN 978-1-61429-250-0
