= Claude AnShin Thomas =

American Zen Buddhist monk

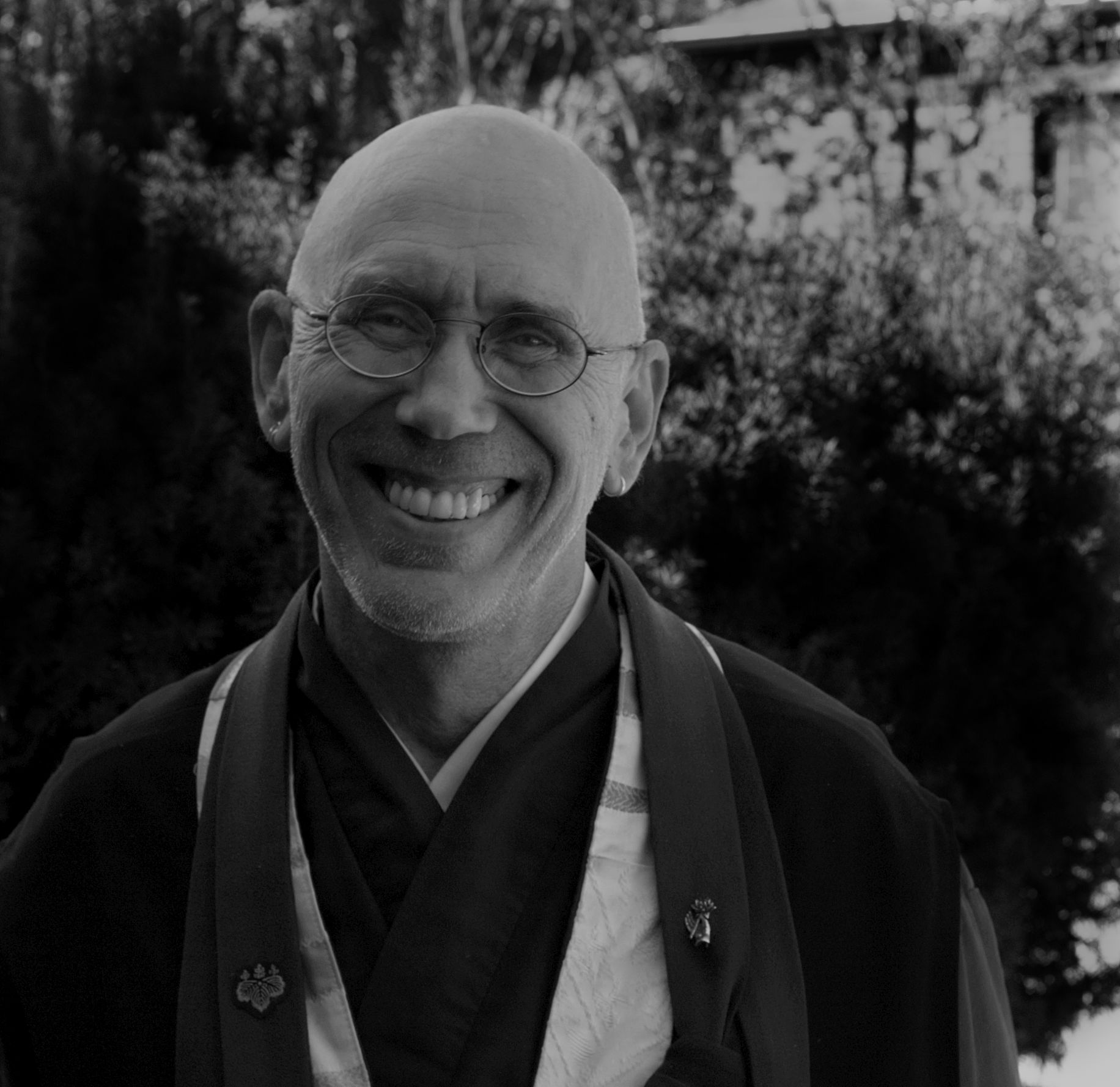
- Claude Anshin Thomas

Personal life
- Born: Claude Anshin Thomas; 1947 (age 78–79) Pennsylvania
- Website: www.zaltho.org

Religious life
- Religion: Zen Buddhism
- School: Sōtō

Claude Anshin Thomas (born 1947) is an American Zen Buddhist monk and Vietnam War veteran. He is an international speaker, teacher and writer, and an advocate of non-violence. Thomas was brought to Buddhism by Vietnamese Zen Buddhist teacher Thich Nhat Hanh, and was ordained in 1995 by Tetsugen Bernard Glassman of the Zen Peacemaker Order. Thomas teaches Buddhist meditation practice and dharma to the public through social projects, talks, and retreats. Since 1994, Thomas has walked 19,000 miles (31,000 km) on peace pilgrimages throughout Europe, Asia, the Middle East, and the United States. While walking, Thomas carries no money, and begs for food and shelter in the mendicant monk tradition. He is the author of At Hell's Gate: A Soldier's Journey from War to Peace (2004) and founder of the Zaltho Foundation, a nonprofit organization dedicated to ending violence.

== Early life ==
Thomas was born in November 1947 in Pennsylvania and grew up in the town of Waterford. His father was a teacher and World War II veteran, and his mother worked as a barmaid, waitress, and house cleaner. His grandfather was a World War I veteran and one of his great-grandfathers fought in the Spanish–American War. Thomas experienced an abusive childhood; his mother physically abused him in his home, and his father was emotionally distant. In one incident, his mother threw him down a flight of stairs, and in another his father severely beat him. His relatives spoke glowingly about their war experiences, talking about it as a great adventure and influencing the young Thomas. When he was 11, his parents separated. Thomas began studying Korean style Karate (Hapkido) at the age of 14; His teacher worked closely with him and practiced a secular form of Zen that did not include the teachings of the Buddha.

In school, Thomas was a competitive athlete and was influenced by the warrior mentality he found on the playing field. He was influenced by Hollywood movies, which sold him on the idea of going to war. Thomas was offered an athletic scholarship to attend college, but turned it down when his father convinced him he was not ready for college and was afraid he would drop out. Thomas would often steal cars for joyriding and lived by his own rules. After graduating from high school in 1965 he joined the U.S. Army, and later with his father's permission, he volunteered to serve in Vietnam at the age of 17.

== Vietnam War service ==
"The war is never over. War does not begin with a declaration and ends with an armistice. Wars can not exist unless we support them. War is a collective expression of our individual aggression, it is a collective expression of our individual suffering. - This is an example of the interconnectedness of all things -. If a bag of rice falls in China, it has an impact on my life whether I see it or not, whether I touch it or not. And if I am not willing to wake up then this reality of aggression will continue."

— Claude Anshin Thomas

From September 1966 to November 1967, Thomas served as a helicopter crew chief in the Vietnam War. He began as a door gunner with the 90th Replacement Battalion in Long Binh and was next assigned to the 116th Assault Helicopter Company in Phu Loi, where he began using the M60 machine gun. On one ground patrol, Thomas and four other men in his unit were fired upon by men dressed as Buddhist monks carrying weapons beneath their robes. All five soldiers were wounded and three died.

As a soldier, Thomas killed several hundred Vietnamese people. The helicopter crews he worked on made bets among themselves on which soldiers could kill the most enemy troops. Thomas survived being shot down five times. On the fifth occasion, in mid-1967, he was shot down in the Mekong Delta. The pilot and commander were killed and the gunner and Thomas were wounded. Thomas was injured in the shoulder and face, and broke his jaw, cheekbones, ribs and neck, and split his sternum. Thomas received 25 Air Medals, the equivalent of 625 combat hours, and the Distinguished Flying Cross and the Purple Heart military decorations.

== Return to U.S. ==
Thomas was returned to the U.S. and spent nine months in physical therapy recovering from his shoulder injury at the Ireland Army Community Hospital in Fort Knox, Kentucky. He was released from the hospital and honorably discharged from the Army on August 23, 1968. Thomas returned to a country that still supported the war, but many employers would not hire veterans, and he had difficulty finding a job. He carried a gun everywhere, and slept with one for protection. He tried to forget about the war, and did not speak much about it, but he could not stop thinking about it. "Everywhere I looked there was the war." Thomas got married and enrolled at Slippery Rock University of Pennsylvania where he studied English Education, but soon found himself homeless, unemployed and addicted to drugs and alcohol. He spent several spells in jail, and tried to cope with the symptoms of posttraumatic stress disorder (PTSD). Images of the war replayed themselves in his mind, leading to the disintegration of his marriage and the abandonment of his wife and son.

PTSD made it difficult to sleep, and at night he would relive his memories of the war. For two years, Thomas lived in a burned-out car in the Strip District in Pittsburgh. He began traveling outside the U.S. in 1970, and in 1974, Thomas bought a one-way ticket from London to Iran, and later returned to the U.S. In the early 1980s, Thomas worked as a counselor for the Veteran's Outreach Center in Boston. In 1983, Thomas successfully completed drug rehabilitation in New Hampshire, and stopped carrying a gun in 1984 because he no longer felt it kept him safe. Although he had studied and taught martial arts for 27 years, he realized that martial arts was contributing to the "seeds of violence", and he stopped his involvement in 1989. Thomas later received a master's degree from Lesley College in Management and reconciled with his son.

== Buddhism ==
In the beginning of the 1990s, Thomas was residing in Concord, Massachusetts. Confined to his home and afraid to go outside, Thomas experienced the symptoms of severe PTSD. When he did leave, jets flying overhead would make him think he was under attack. If he went grocery shopping, he would imagine that the canned goods were booby-trapped. To deal with these feelings, he began working with a social worker in Cambridge, who recommended visiting a retreat for Vietnam veterans run by Thich Nhat Hanh, a Vietnamese Buddhist monk. Thomas traveled to Rhinebeck, New York, to attend a retreat at the Omega Institute. Several months later, a nun invited Thomas to Plum Village Monastery in France to work directly with the Vietnamese community. Thich Nhat Hanh invited Thomas to become a monk in 1992, but Thomas refused because he believed he was not ready. Actor and Zen Buddhist Michael O'Keefe introduced Thomas to Tetsugen Bernard Glassman in 1994. While participating in a peace pilgrimage in Auschwitz, Thomas took sixteen vows as a Zen Peacemaker from Glassman on December 6 at the Birkenau extermination camp. During the ceremony, Glassman gave Thomas two new names: Anshin ("Heart of Peace") and Angyo ("Peacemaker"). Less than a year later, Glassman ordained Thomas as a Zen Buddhist monk in the Japanese Soto and Rinzai Zen tradition in Yonkers, New York, on August 6, 1995.

== Writing ==
Thomas began publishing essays, poetry, and books about his experience as a veteran and Buddhist after combining mindfulness meditation and writing, a practice he learned at the Veterans Writing Workshop organized by author Maxine Hong Kingston. In 1996, he wrote an essay called "Finding Peace after a Lifetime of War", which was published in a collection of works about Engaged Buddhism by Parallax Press. His poems were published in 1997 as part of the poetry collection, What book!? Buddha Poems from Beat to Hiphop, and in 2004, Shambhala Publications released his first book, At Hell's Gate: A Soldier's Journey from War to Peace. In Italy, At Hell's Gate was published by il Saggiatore as Una volta ero un soldato – Dall'orrore del Vietnam all'incontro con il Buddhismo. In 2006, selected work by Thomas was included in Kingston's Veterans of War, Veterans of Peace, a collection of stories by veterans who attended Kingston's workshops.

== Pilgrimages ==
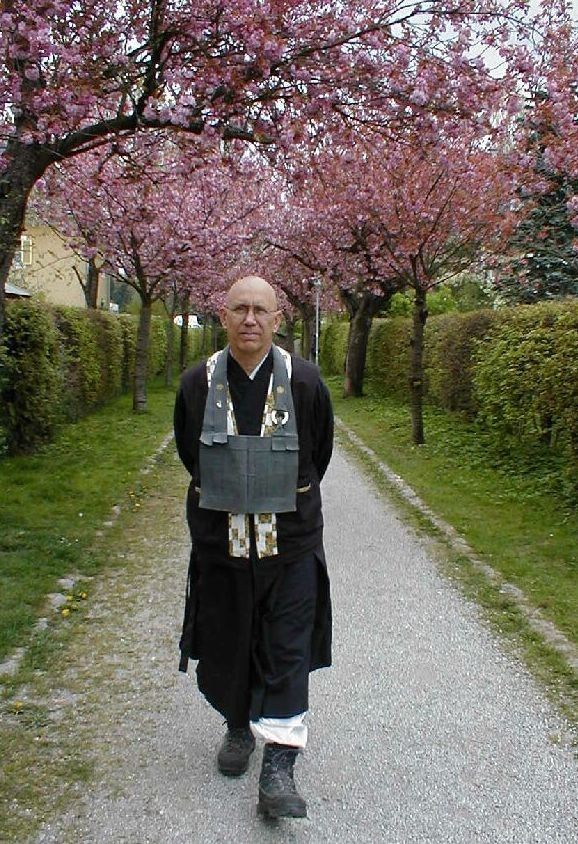
Thomas walking

Thomas organizes and participates in international peace pilgrimages. Clothed in only robes and carrying no money, Thomas leads groups of Buddhists who travel between towns begging for food and lodging, a practice known as takuhatsu. This practice of generosity is rooted in the Buddhist virtue called dāna, the first of the ten pāramitās. Buddhists like Thomas are trying to keep the practice of dāna alive, as they believe that the act of giving benefits those who give. Since 1994, Thomas has walked 19,000 miles (31,000 km) on peace pilgrimages.

=== Auschwitz to Vietnam ===
In December 1994, Sasamori Shonin and other Japanese Nichiren Buddhist monks helped organize and lead a meeting of 200 people at Auschwitz for The Interfaith Pilgrimage for Peace and Life., an eight-month peace march from Auschwitz to Hiroshima, which was timed to coincide with the fiftieth anniversary of the atomic bombings of Hiroshima and Nagasaki and the liberation of the Auschwitz concentration camp. Thomas helped lead the 5,000 miles (8,000 km) peace pilgrimage that would allow him to "bear witness to major sites of war and violence" through 27 countries in Eastern Europe and Asia. The pilgrimage continued to Vienna, Croatia, Hungary, Serbia, Romania, Bulgaria, Greece, the West Bank, Gaza, Israel, Jordan, Iraq, India, Malaysia, Thailand, Cambodia, and Vietnam, where Thomas was accompanied by his son. Because of the distances to be covered, closed borders and government restrictions, the group was unable to walk on occasions and had traveled by alternative means. Reflecting on the march, Thomas writes:

On the pilgrimage from Auschwitz to Vietnam, I went to practice peace, to be peace, but I was not walking expressly for peace. If I have some preconceived notion of what peace is, I might never be able to participate in it. Peace is not an idea, peace is not a political movement, not a theory or a dogma. Peace is a way of life: living mindfully in the present moment, breathing, enjoying each breath. Peace becomes. It is fresh and new with every moment.

=== New York to California ===
In 1998, Thomas and group of Zen Buddhists walked 3,000 miles (4,800 km) from New York to California in the tradition of mendicant monks. When they arrived in a new town, they would visit local religious organizations and ask them for a place to sleep and eat. If the answer was no, they would sleep outside and go hungry. The group covered an average distance of between 15 miles (24 km) and 30 miles (48 km) a day with large packs on their backs. They encountered few problems except in the eastern U.S., particularly in the state of Ohio where they were stopped more often by the police. Nevertheless, the group was helped by strangers throughout the country; some invited them into their homes. In Boulder, Colorado, the group used a truck to carry their water through the desert.

=== Germany ===
Thomas and six others walked more than 620 miles (1,000 km) across Germany between August and October 1999; more walkers joined them en route. They held Buddhist retreats and services at sites of "terror, abuse, degradation, torture and killing", and hundreds of people participated in the events.

=== Hungary to Germany ===
From August to October 2002, Thomas made a pilgrimage from Budapest to the Mauthausen-Gusen concentration camp and then to the Bergen-Belsen concentration camp, following the route of the death marches made by Jews during the Holocaust.

=== Massachusetts to Washington, D.C. ===
From September to October 2004, Thomas and a small group walked from Concord, Massachusetts, through Connecticut, New York, New Jersey, and Delaware, to Washington, D.C.

=== Texas to California ===
From March to June 2007, Thomas and eight Zen Buddhists walked 1,650 miles (2,660 km) along the U.S.-Mexico border between Brownsville, Texas and Border Field State Park, Imperial Beach, California. Support was provided by the All Souls Unitarian Universalist Church in Brownsville. It took a month to walk from Brownsville to El Paso during which, the group was often stopped by law enforcement, sometimes by the county sheriff, the National Guard, or the Border Patrol. Each time they were stopped, the officers would approach the group with loaded firearms, expressing concern for their safety. Thomas used these incidents as an opportunity to practice nonviolence. When law enforcement personnel asked if they could do anything for the walkers, Thomas answered, "We're ok, we have plenty of water, but could you take your hands off your sidearm?" According to Thomas, 87% removed their hands from the gun. He would then ask if he could tell them about their pilgrimage. While passing through West Texas, the group encountered a dust storm; 68 days later, they arrived at the Pacific Ocean.

== Other activities ==
For more than a decade, Thomas has participated in meditation retreats with war veterans and their families in the United States and Europe. He is often asked how to support returned service personnel. Thomas responds:

Wake up to the roots of war in you. And, allow them to be your teacher. Because we can't do anything for them, not really, unless they ask us, unless they want that. But, we can't hear what they're saying, we can't hear what people are saying, unless we're willing to wake up to our conditioning. Because it was my conditioning, it was the karma that I inherited, and then the karma that I was creating that kept me deaf. I couldn't hear. I did not have the gift of Avalokiteśvara, of kanzeon, bodhisattva. I didn't have the gift of hearing. I couldn't hear the sounds of the world.

In 1993, Thomas started the Zaltho Foundation, a non-profit organization committed to ending violence, supporting socially engaged projects in schools, communities, organizations, and families. Programs include pilgrimages, talks, retreats, and outreach to veterans, prisoners, substance abusers, the homeless, and refugees. The foundation operates two Buddhist teaching centers: the Magnolia Zen Center in Mary Esther, Florida and the Clock Tower Practice Center in Maynard, Massachusetts.

== Publications ==
- Thomas, Claude (1996). "Finding Peace after a Lifetime of War". In Arnold Kotler (ed.). Engaged Buddhist Reader. Parallax Press. ISBN 0-938077-98-8.
- Thomas, Claude Anshin (1997). "Claude Anshin Thomas". In Gary Gach (ed.). What book!? Buddha Poems from Beat to Hiphop. Parallax Press. pp. 74–78. ISBN 0-938077-92-9.
- Thomas, Claude Anshin (2004). At Hell's Gate: A Soldier's Journey from War to Peace. Boston: Shambhala Publications. ISBN 1-59030-134-X.

== See also ==
- Peace Pilgrim

== Further reading and resources ==
- Abernethy, Bob (1997-10-17). "Profile: Thich Nhat Hanh". Religion & Ethics Newsweekly. Public Broadcasting Service. Archived from the original on May 3, 2004.
- Bisbee Lotus Sangha (2007). "Audio Dharma: Rev. Claude AnShin Thomas" (Podcast). Bisbee Lotus Sangha. Archived from the original on 2011-07-25.
- Flanders, Laura (2009-09-03). "At Hell's Gate: A Soldier's Journey From War to Peace". New York City: GRITtv.
- Fliakos, Phoebe (1993-12-12). "Group sows 'Seeds of Peace' in Bosnia". Boston Herald. p. 16. See also: "Trying to Light a Candle; Schaeffer-Duffy on Peace Mission". Telegram & Gazette. 1993-12-04.
- Glassman, Bernie (1998). Bearing Witness: A Zen Master's Lessons in Making Peace. New York: Bell Tower. ISBN 0-609-60061-3.
- Johnson, Bela (2005-04-01). "Alternative Currents: Claude AnShin Thomas". weru.org (Podcast). WERU-FM. Archived from the original on 2011-07-28.
- Maida, Gaetano Kazuo; Kingsley, Ben; Hanh, Thich Nhat; Thomas, Claude (2005). Peace is Every Step - Meditation in Action: The Life and Work of Thich Nhat Hanh (Documentary). Festival Media.
- Miller, Celinda (2007-04-05). "Buddhist Monk war veterans stop in Columbus on journey". The Deming Headlight.
- O'Keefe, Michael (director); Weinstock, Brett (producer) (1997). Raising the Ashes (Documentary).
- Sullivan, Emily (April 2008). "The Journey to Peace". New Life Journal. 9 (3): 30–31.
- Thomas, Claude Anshin (2005). "The Flame at the Tip of the Candle". In Melvin McLeod (ed.). The Best Buddhist Writing 2005. Shambhala Publications. pp. 27–39. ISBN 1-59030-275-3.
- Thomas, Claude Anshin (2006) [2004]. At Hell's Gate: A Soldier's Journey from War to Peace. Boston: Shambhala Publications. ISBN 1-59030-271-0.
- Thomas, Claude Anshin (2006-09-01). "Claude AnShin Thomas" (Podcast). Global Studies Department, Warren Wilson College.
- Whalen-Bridge, John; John Phillips (May 2006). "Enlightenment (Zen Buddhist)". Theory, Culture & Society. 23 (2–3): 180. doi:10.1177/026327640602300231. S2CID 145507733.
