= Angel Kyodo williams =

American writer

angel Kyodo williams
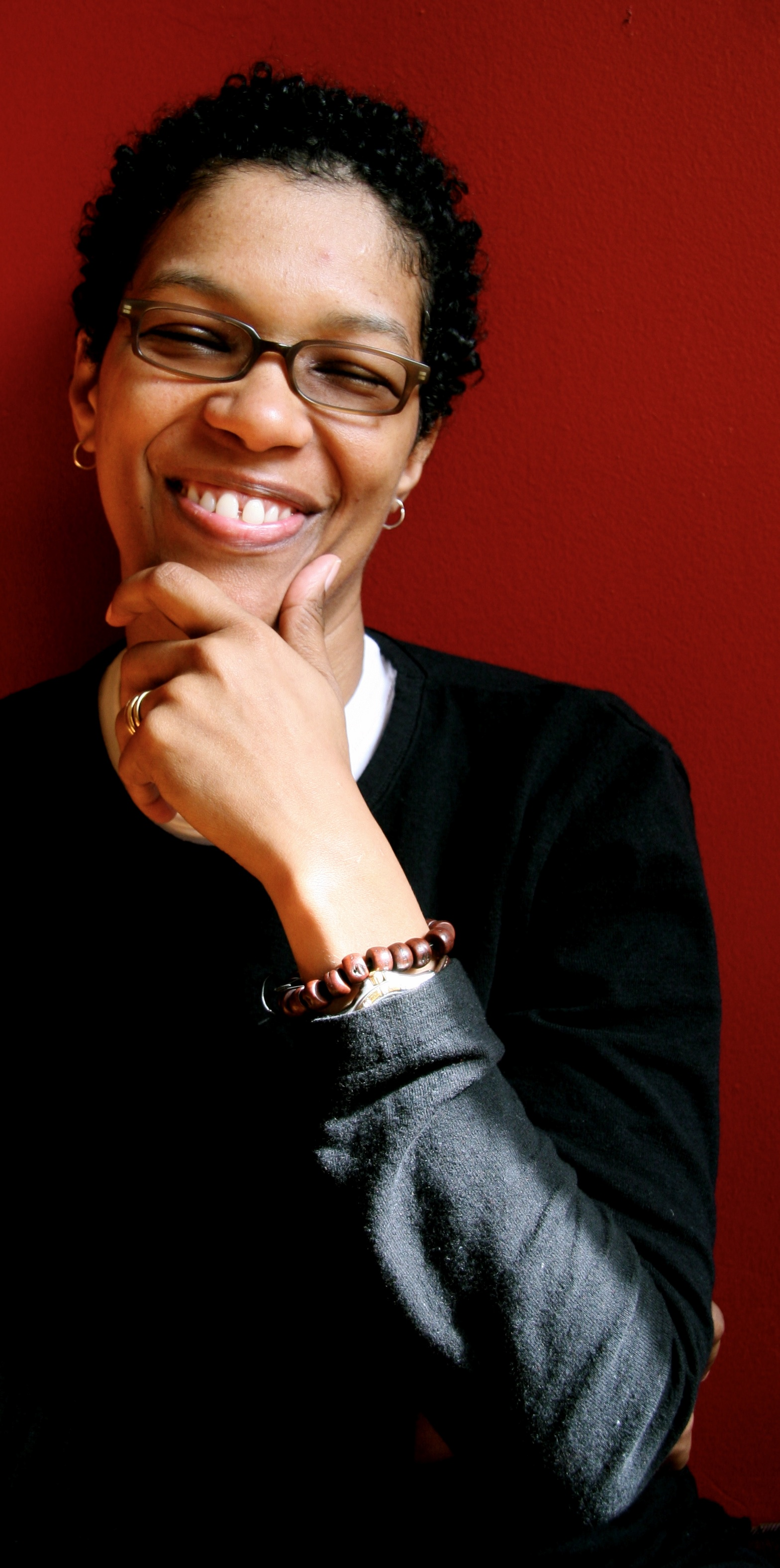
- angel Kyodo williams, photo Bethanie Hines, 2008
- Born: December 20, 1969 (age 56); New York City, U.S.
- Occupations: spiritual teacher, author, entrepreneur
- Website: angelkyodowilliams.com

angel Kyodo williams (born December 2, 1969) is an American writer, activist, ordained Zen priest and the author of Being Black: Zen and the Art of Living with Fearlessness and Grace, published by Viking Press in 2000, and the co-author of Radical Dharma: Talking Race, Love, and Liberation, published by North Atlantic Books. Called "the most vocal and most intriguing African-American Buddhist in America" by Library Journal, williams is the Spiritual Director of the meditation-based newDharma Community and founder of the Center for Transformative Change in Berkeley, California and is also credited with developing fearlessMeditation, fearlessYoga and Warrior Spirit Training. As of October 2013, she is the world's 2nd female Zen teacher of African descent. Her given Buddhist name, Kyodo, means "Way of Teaching."

== Biography ==
=== Early life ===
Williams was raised by her father, a firefighter, in Queens and Brooklyn and then by her mother in Tribeca, Manhattan, after her parents separated when she was very young. She attended junior high school in Chinatown, New York, high school in Chelsea and attended Nazareth College in Rochester, NY.

=== Spiritual history ===
After reading D. T. Suzuki's Zen and Japanese Culture, Shunryu Suzuki's, Zen Mind, Beginner's Mind, and receiving her first formal meditation instruction at San Francisco Zen Center while visiting California, williams sought a community and teacher. Originally a formal student of Roshi Pat Enkyo O'Hara at the Village Zendo in New York City, she was ordained as a priest by Francisco "Paco" Lugoviña, from whom she also received denkai and hoshi empowerments, authorizing her to transmit the precepts to others and making her a dharma holder in the Zen tradition, respectively. As of October 2013, she is the world's second black female Zen teacher.

=== Career ===
In 1996, she and Rebecca Walker, daughter of novelist Alice Walker, opened Kokobar, the first cybercafe owned and operated by African-American women, in Fort Greene, Brooklyn, with financial backing from, among others, musician Tracy Chapman, filmmaker Spike Lee and Rita Owens (mother of Dana Owens, a.k.a. Queen Latifah). Walker withdrew from the affairs of the business and left it to williams shortly after it opened. Sheriffs began to remove the physical property of the cafe, allegedly because of Chapman's unpaid loan. This caused the cafe to close in 1997.

In 2000, williams wrote Being Black: Zen and the Art of Living With Fearlessness and Grace, a nonfiction work published by Putnam/Penguin, to introduce more Black people and people of color to Buddhist principles. She sought to use Buddhism's "profoundly anti-elitist, anti-authoritarian, and antisectarian essence to revitalize" Black identity politics and practice in America.

In 2003, Waxploitation Records founder Jeff Antebi approached williams's publisher to create a musical companion to Being Black. The CD, published by Spun Records, features work by well-known hiphop artists, MCs and producers, including Blackalicious, will.i.am of The Black Eyed Peas, DJ Jazzy Jeff, Jurassic 5 and King Britt, among others. The CD includes both original and existing music "inspired by" the book. Poet Ursula Rucker performs vocal interludes that are quotes of Williams taken directly from the book. A Japan-distributed import version was released shortly after the American release.

In 2003, she also received a Spiritual Activism Fellowship, along with seven others considered at the forefront of that field.

Later that year, she moved from New York City to Oakland, California, and in January 2004 founded the New Dharma Meditation Center, serving as teacher and spiritual director. The center was established specifically to serve the spiritual needs of people of color while developing an approach to training that viewed individual, community and social transformation as a spiritual practice. Williams consistently challenged the established Buddhist communities in America, which are largely white, to make people of color welcome in practice settings, which she regarded as a failure of that population. Beginning in a small sublet, it transitioned to a three-story Victorian home on the border of Emeryville.

Having grown into a residential practice center with a focus on social transformation, the New Dharma Meditation Center moved in 2007 to its current home in Berkeley, California. There, it was renamed the Center for Urban Peace and in 2009 became the Center for Transformative Change (CXC).

Williams has been featured on the Oxygen Channel and CNNfn, and has appeared in The New York Times, Boston Globe, Village Voice, Wired, Essence, and other publications. She now focuses her attention on the emerging field of "transformative social change" — an approach to social justice outcomes williams deems a new social movement — and is credited with coining the phrase for with respect to this area and field of work by way of several essays.

== See also ==
- Buddhism in the United States
- Five Precepts

== Books ==
- Being Black: Zen and the Art of Living With Fearlessness and Grace, hardcover edition ISBN 0-670-89268-8 (2000)
- Being Black: Zen and the Art of Living With Fearlessness and Grace, paperback edition ISBN 0-14-019630-7 (2002)
- Framing Deep Change: Essays on Transformative Social Change, editor, ISBN 978-0-9828845-0-8 (2010)
- Radical Dharma: Talking Race, Love, and Liberation, paperback edition ISBN 978-1-6231709-8-1 (2016)

== Recordings ==
- Being Black: A Musical Companion Inspired By the angel Kyodo williams Classic, worldcat.org ASIN B00007KFSG (2003)
- Being Black: A Musical Companion Inspired By the angel Kyodo williams Classic, Japan Release (2003)

== Selected board participation ==
- Seasons Fund for Social Transformation
- Stand, formerly Forest Ethics
