= Zen Peacemakers =

Network of socially engaged Buddhists

The Zen Peacemakers is a diverse network of socially engaged Buddhists, currently including the formal structures of the Zen Peacemakers International, the Zen Peacemaker Order and the Zen Peacemaker Circles, many affiliated individuals and groups, and communities formed by Dharma Successors of Roshi Bernie Glassman. It was founded by Bernie Glassman and his second wife Sandra Jishu Holmes in 1996, as a means of continuing the work begun with the Greyston Foundation in 1980 of expanding Zen practice into larger spheres of influence such as social services, business and ecology but with a greater emphasis on peace work. Eve Marko, Bernie Glassman's third wife, is a founding teacher of the Zen Peacemaker Order. Zen Peacemakers have developed from the White Plum Asanga lineage of Taizan Maezumi.

== Tradition and lineage ==
Although Zen Peacemakers are associated with the White Plum Asanga lineage, founder Bernie Glassman did not envisage it as an organization bound by traditional Japanese Sōtō Zen practice. Bernie Glassman has said:

Maezumi Roshi was not carrying out the tradition of the Japanese Soto sect when he came here. The Soto sect of Japan was not carrying out the traditions of Chinese Zen. You have to be careful with the word 'traditional.' We honor a lot of eccentric people.

Likewise, although within the lineage, the Zen Peacemaker Order was not formed as part of the White Plum Asanga organization. Links between the two organizations are now distant; despite being named as heir to the presidency of the White Plum Asanga in Maezumi's will, Glassman ceased attending the annual meetings of Taizan Maezumi's dharma heirs within a few years of his former teacher's death. According to the author James Ishmael Ford, as of 2006 Glassman has "transferred his leadership of the White Plum Asanga to his Dharma brother Merzel Roshi and has formally 'disrobed,' renouncing priesthood in favor of serving as a lay teacher and leader of what is now called the Zen Peacemaker Family."

== Greyston Foundation ==
Activities of the Zen Peacemakers originated in Yonkers, New York with the opening of the Greyston Bakery, its most well-known and prosperous project, in 1982. Its projects eventually united under the auspices of the Greyston Foundation, a network of community development companies and non-profit organizations based in the inner city. Greyston Family Inn opened in 1991, on proceeds from the sale of Greyston mansion. It provides permanent housing for homeless people, with a child day-care center amongst services available for residents. Currently, there are three buildings, providing fifty housing units. Other projects include the Greyston Garden Project, five community-run gardens established on neglected properties. In 1992 Greyston Health Services was formed, primarily to provide services for poor people with HIV/AIDS. In 1997 Issan House opened, named after Issan Dorsey a Zen Roshi who had died from an AIDS-related condition in 1990. It provides thirty-five permanent housing units for people living with both HIV/AIDS and mental illness or chemical dependency. The Maitri Day Program within the building provides a variety of health and rehabilitative service to 150 people with HIV/AIDS from the local community. As one of the first 'welfare to work' programs in the US, in 2004 Greyston had an annual budget of over $20 million and received numerous government grants. At Yonkers, they occupy the former Ethan Flagg House-Blessed Sacrament Monastery, added to the National Register of Historic Places in 1998.

== International ==
In 1996 Bernie Glassman - with his wife Sandra Jishu Holmes - officially founded the Zen Peacemaker Order, later the Zen Peacemaker Circle and currently Zen Peacemakers. According to professor Christopher S. Queen, "The order is based on three principles: plunging into the unknown, bearing witness to the pain and joy of the world and a commitment to heal oneself and the world."

Zen Peacemaker projects have included a Paris soup kitchen for immigrants and non-violence efforts in the Palestinian territories, with joint Israeli-Palestinian peaceful coexistence projects in Israel. Zen Peacemakers in Poland established 'Nonviolent Communications Training and Practice' in the national public school system and opened an AIDS hospice. The Auschwitz project brought together families of the Holocaust survivors and the descendants of those who ran the camps to '"bear witness to the horrors of war" during retreats at the site of the former German concentration camp in Poland. In the United States, Zen Peacemakers have campaigned for prison reform, provided hospice care and worked with the poor in both inner-city and rural areas.

Zen Peacemakers have 70 affiliate centers in 5 Continents and 12 Countries. Countries with groups affiliated to Zen Peacemakers include Austria, Belgium, Brazil, Germany, Ireland, Mexico, the Netherlands, Switzerland, and the UK. In the United States affiliates include the Upaya Institute and Zen Center led by Joan Halifax in Santa Fe, New Mexico.

== Elders and Spiritual Directors ==
The founder Roshi Bernie Glassman has served as the spiritual director of Zen Peacemakers from its inception. In May 2005 Roshi Enkyo Pat O'Hara was ratified as Co-Spiritual Director by the Zen Peacemaker Board. Rami Efal serves as director of the Zen Peacemakers International organisation, acting as a 'hive' to collect and share ideas for the widespread community. In Europe, Cornelius Collande, Barbara Wegmueller, Michel DuBois, and Frank De Waele are among the elders of the Zen Peacemakers community and the Auschwitz Bearing Witness retreat. For the Zen Peacemaker Circles, the current coordinator in Europe is Kathleen Battke, who succeeded Barbara Wegmueller in the role, and in America, the longest-serving elder in Circle practice is Jeana Moore.

== Zen Peacemaker Sangha ==
The structure of Zen Peacemakers is, like the Greyston Foundation, somewhat complex and also like Greyston is described as a mandala. The mandala is based on the Five Buddha Families with the intention that the organization addresses needs in all aspects of life. The Zen Peacemakers Sangha (ZPS) is a branch of the Zen Peacemakers Order. It is an association of groups founded by or led by seniors empowered by Bernie Glassman or groups who practice Zen and socially engaged Zen. The ZPS is a forum for sharing the diverse methods of practice, service and teaching within the Zen Peacemakers Order for the purpose of education and personal development as practitioners and teachers.

== The Mother House ==
Formerly sited in Montague, Massachusetts, in the United States, the Mother House was the study and practice center of the Zen Peacemakers. The approach of the institute is based on the Japanese concept gyogaku funi, or "practice and study are not two". It provides various training paths, study programs, and hands-on internships. The Mother House hosted various programs including the Montague Farm Zendo, the Montague Farm Zen House and a residence program.

The Mother House was foreclosed on in 2011 and sold to a private owner in 2012.

== Training and Spiritual practices ==
The training of the Zen Peacemakers is grounded in traditional Zen practice - meditation, retreats, liturgy, personal study-relationships with empowered teachers - and also explores new forms and structures. Council circle, Nonviolent Communication, international Bearing Witness retreats, and "plunges" - immersing oneself in unfamiliar situations, often connected with social action, which requires the participant to let go of what they know and responds in new ways - have come to form core elements of the training throughout the network of practitioners. Glassman trained in clowning as a personal plunge, visiting war zones, and performing for the children. In his later years, Glassman disrobed from the priesthood to develop lay zen practice, following the tradition of his heart teacher Koryu Osaka Roshi. Together with his third wife Eve Marko, he empowered lay zen preceptors, and Eve Marko worked on a new set of "householder koans". Lay and circle forms of liturgy such as the Gate of Sweet Nectar, Glassman's translation, and elaboration of the traditional Japanese Kanromon ceremony of feeding the hungry ghosts, came to be explored and shared with the community. At the heart of the Zen Peacemakers approach is the conviction that service and social action are themselves zen practice, together with the challenge to develop new 'upayas' (tools) to meet each new situation.

Formulations of spiritual principles specific to the order include "The Sixteen Practices of a Zen Peacemaker", comprising the "Three Refuges", the "Three Tenets" and the "Ten Practices" of a Zen Peacemaker

== Zen Peacemaker Circles ==
A few years later, we formed something called Peacemaker Circle International, dedicated to creating networks of spiritually-based social activists. Not just networks, but coalitions. And not just coalitions, but circles. We had done a lot of direct services – building homes, taking care of kids, taking care of the sick, creating jobs for people. What we noticed is that if we just did this one thing, each of us could only do so much. Even if each of us did a wonderful job, it was still just that one job. Now, how do you take care of the poor? How do you take care of people who have AIDS in Africa when all you can do is just one job? So you need to change the game. Instead of always competing with everybody for money or recognition and all of the politics that NGOs and not-for-profits engage in, why don't we spend some of that energy to start linking – linking and creating a real force for social action that's made up of all of us working together? If somebody says, "What is Buddhist about this?" I would ask, "How do you define Buddhism?" If it's about awakening to the oneness of life, then this is a real way to do it. Working together is a wonderful way to wake up to this oneness. So we started bringing this work to different countries. We started in Europe. Then we went to the Middle East. And then we started in Latin America ... We introduced this model of organizing interlocking circles and began planning how these different groups could work to help each other, instead of working separately.

In the early 2000s, Bernie Glassman and his third wife Eve Marko worked with circles of spiritually minded activists around the world to develop a consensus-based model for social action and interfaith spiritual practice. Initially called Peacemaker Circle International, they later became known as Zen Peacemaker Circles. The interfaith strand of the Zen Peacemakers was influenced by Bernie Glassman's friendship with Sufi teacher and radio host Lex Hixon, his appreciation of the Jewish renewal leader Rabbi Zalman Schachter-Shalomi, and his many Christian zen students and successors. Zen Peacemaker Circles were established globally, presenting a model of zen practice that replaced the traditional role of 'Zen teacher' with innovative communities of practitioners learning from each other and sharing ideas between Circles. Decision making used the approach of Sociocracy, and Bernie Glassman created two new community roles of Steward and Circle Dharmaholder to support the model. The 'circular transmission' experiment was largely abandoned after the loss of the Mother House in 2011, although Zen Peacemaker Circle training continues in the UK, Germany and the US. In other communities, the tools of Circle practice, especially Council circle have been incorporated into traditional zen training, to give a voice to students, for social action and for governance

Dharma teachers are often schooled in the dharma, in delivery, but not in community decision making. Traditionally organizations have been run on a hierarchical model, with one or two people making all the decisions. How inspiring to have processes that can engage entire groups. The circles of decision-makers are an image of interdependence. Interdependence should be reflected in the organization of organizations. How to continue to realize and express the project of interdependence? The inherent interconnectedness of all life.

== Street Retreats ==
'Street retreats', excursions by Bernie Glassman and others into the streets for days at a time to live amongst the homeless, have become a feature of Zen Peacemaker practice. Author James Ishmael Ford writes, "... 'street retreats,' for instance, moves sesshin into the streets: participants eat in soup kitchens, and, if they know they're not displacing homeless people, sleep in homeless shelters or, otherwise, sleep in public places. Zazen takes place in parks and dokusan in alleys."

== Socially Engaged Buddhism ==
As a leader of Socially Engaged Buddhism, the Zen Peacemakers publish Bearing Witness, a free monthly online newsletter. The socially engaged practices of Zen Peacemakers is aimed at extending Dharma beyond the meditation hall to the worlds of business, social services, conflict resolution and environmental stewardship. Socially Engaged Buddhism has frequently led to new models of practice, allowing Buddhists to addressing the needs of individuals and communities in disadvantaged areas. The Zen Peacemakers' way is intended to "illuminate all life as a boundless meditation hall".

== Appraisal ==
Religious historian Richard Hughes Seager writes "The Zen Peacemaker Order ... has the potential to rival Thich Nhat Hanh's groups and the Buddhist Peace Fellowship as a force in American activism".

== Notable Zen Peacemakers ==
- Ellen Burstyn
- Tetsugen Bernard Glassman
- Enkyo Pat O'Hara
- Joan Halifax
- Joshin Brian Byrnes
- Robert Kennedy

== Zen Peacemaker Communities ==
- Upaya Institute and Zen Center
- Peacemaker Institute
- Village Zendo
- Zen Center of Los Angeles
- Greyston Foundation
- UK Zen Peacemaker Circles
- Zen Peacemakers Switzerland
- Bread Loaf Mountain Zen Community
- Zen Peacemakers Lage Landen
- Helsinki Zen - Peacemakers Finland

== See also ==
- Timeline of Zen Buddhism in the United States

== Gallery ==
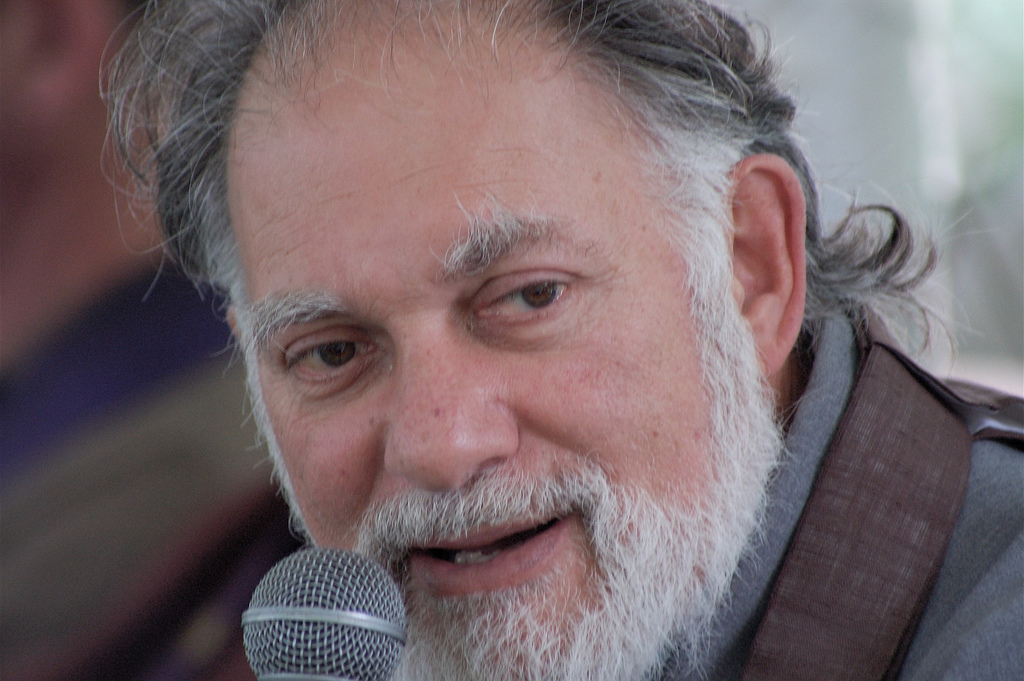

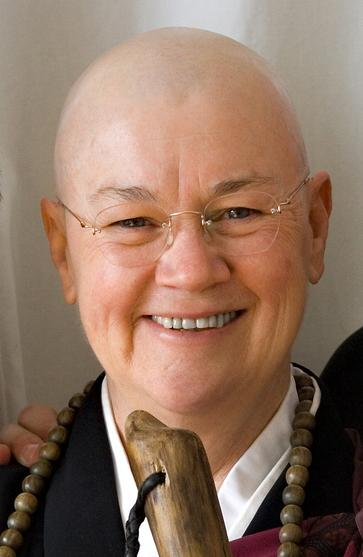

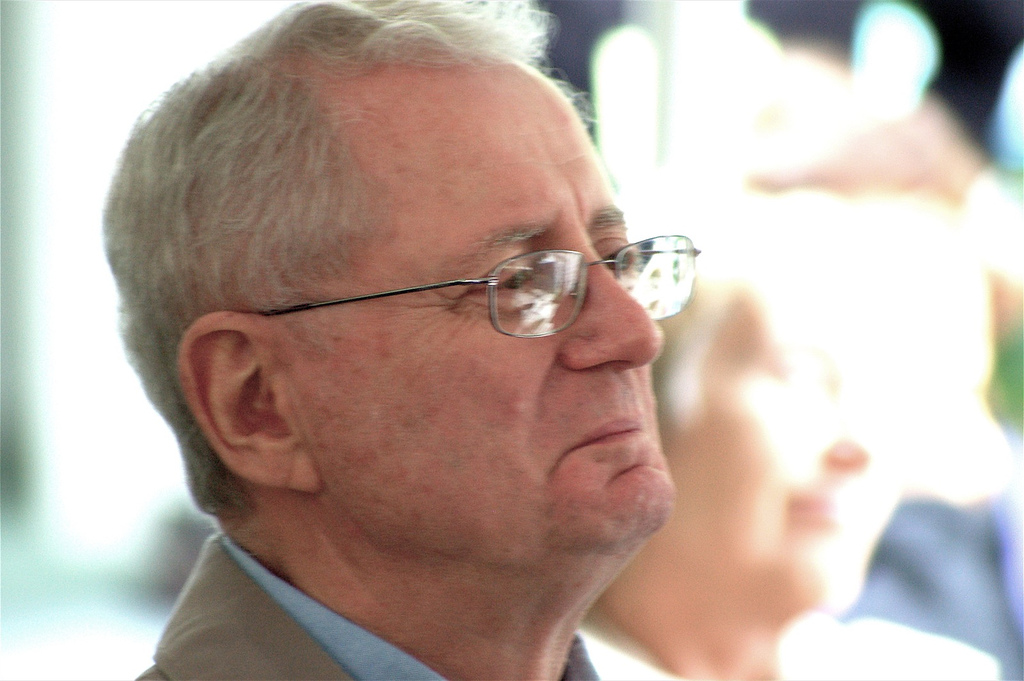

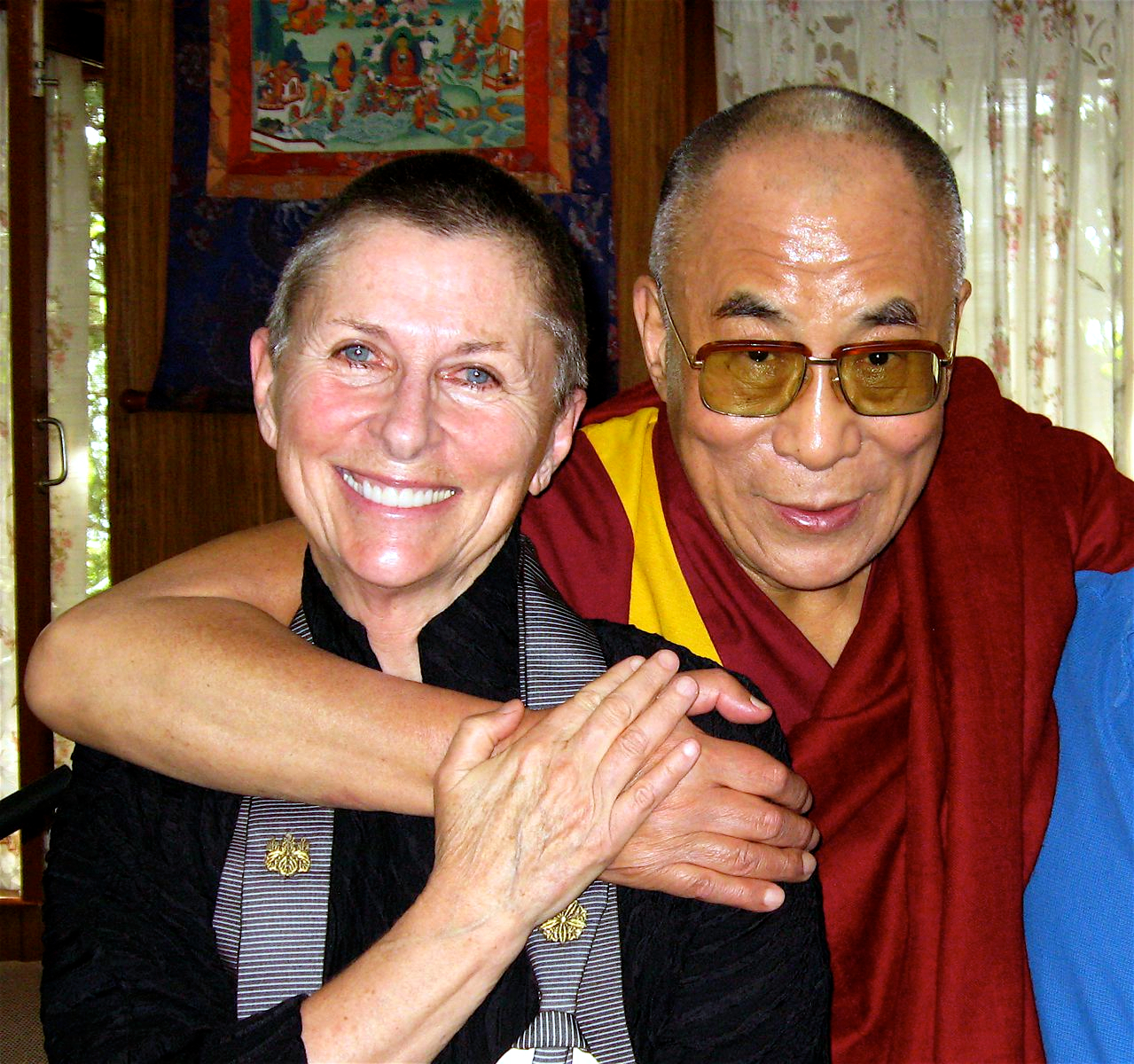
