= New York Zen Center for Contemplative Care =

Soto Zen Centre in New York City, US

Religion
- Affiliation: Sōtō, (White Plum Asanga)

Location
- Location: 119 W. 23rd Street, Suite 401 New York, NY 10011
- Country: United States
- Interactive map of New York Zen Center for Contemplative Care
- Coordinates: 40°44′36″N 73°59′36″W

Architecture
- Founder: Koshin Paley Ellison, Robert Chodo Campbell

Website
- https://www.zencare.org/

New York Zen Center for Contemplative Care is a Soto Zen practice center in Manhattan. It was founded in 2007 by Zen teachers and monks Koshin Paley Ellison and Robert Chodo Campbell. In addition to Soto Zen Buddhist practice and study, NYZC offers training in end-of-life care for medical professionals, carepartners, and those who are dying. Since the Zen center was founded, the priests and their students have worked with over 150,000 people. New York Zen Center for Contemplative Care offers the first fully-accredited Zen Buddhist Clinical Pastoral Education program in the United States.

== Lineage ==
New York Zen Center is a practice center of the White Plum lineage. Founders and Guiding Teachers, Paley Ellison and Campbell, received dharma transmission from Dai En Friedman. Friedman received it from Roshi Peter Matthiessen, who received it from Roshi Bernie Glassman. Glassman was a dharma successor of Taizan Maezumi, who founded the White Plum Asanga lineage.

== See also ==
- Zen in the United States
- Buddhism in the United States
- Timeline of Zen Buddhism in the United States
