= Village Zendo =

Soto Zen practice center in New York City

Coordinates: 40.72482°N 73.99723°W

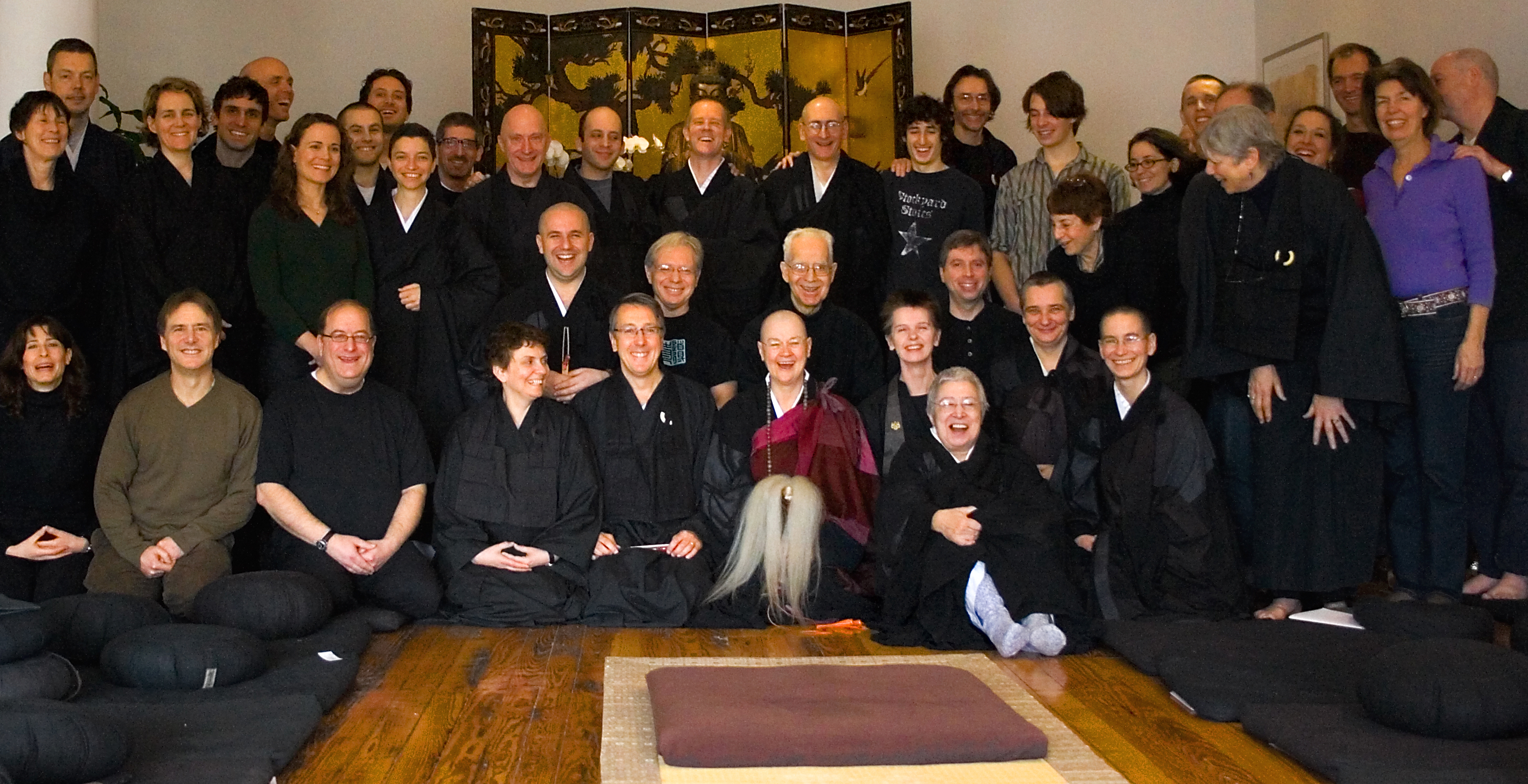
- Group shot of the Village Zendo sangha.

Religion
- Affiliation: Sōtō (White Plum Asanga); Zen Peacemakers

Location
- Location: 260 West Broadway, New York, New York 10013
- Country: United States
- Interactive map of Village Zendo

Architecture
- Founder: Enkyo Pat O'Hara
- Completed: 1986

Website
- www.villagezendo.org/

Village Zendo is a Soto Zen practice center in SoHo, Manhattan, New York City. Originally located in the apartment of Enkyo Pat O'Hara and Barbara Joshin O'Hara, who co-founded the zendo in 1986, the Zen center took up the majority of space in O'Hara's apartment. Village Zendo is a practice center in the lineage of the White Plum Asanga and Zen Peacemakers, the former founded by O'Hara's teacher Taizan Maezumi and the latter by Bernard Glassman.

== Mission Statement ==
To provide a way for realizing a life of awareness, wisdom and compassion. Village Zendo does this by offering training in the teachings of Zen Buddhism and by cultivating and maintaining a practice environment that is supported by teachers and a community of practitioners in the heart of New York City.

== See also ==
- Buddhism in the United States
- Timeline of Zen Buddhism in the United States
