= Enkyo Pat O'Hara =

Enkyō Pat O'Hara
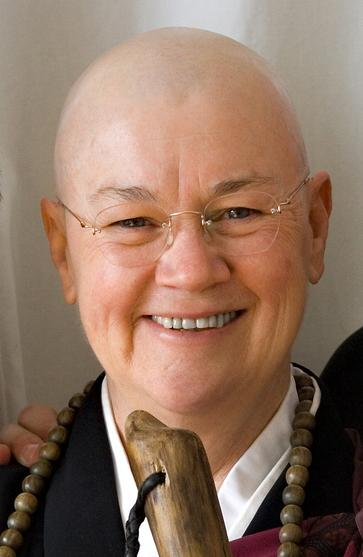
- Title: Roshi

Religious life
- Religion: Zen Buddhism
- School: Sōtō; Zen Peacemakers
- Lineage: White Plum Asanga

Senior posting
- Based in: Tisch School of the Arts; Village Zendo
- Predecessor: Tetsugen Bernard Glassman
- Successor: Barbara Joshin O’Hara; Jules Shuzen Harris Randall Ryotan Eiger; Sinclair Shinryu Thomson; Catherine Anraku Hondorp; Julie Myoko Terestman; Robert Kaku Gunn; Jeremy Manasia; Allan JoAn Tibbetts; Traven Fusho Rice
- Website: www.villagezendo.org

Enkyō Pat O'Hara is a Soto Zen priest and teacher in the White Plum order of Sōtō Zen Buddhism, founded by Roshi Taizan Maezumi.

== Biography ==
Growing up as a young white girl in Tijuana, Mexico while attending Catholic School in the United States, O’Hara was familiar with racism and prejudice. With one foot in each world, racial slurs and comments that were made to her left her feeling ostracized and insecure. However, it wasn’t until her high school years when she discovered and entered the Beat Generation and took to reading various literature including poems by Gary Snyder, who gave way to new ways of thought. It was also in her high school years when she read R.H. Blyth’s translations of Haiku, Buddhist sutras, and writings of D.T. Suzuki that the door to Zen Buddhism opened, her attraction being Zen’s artistic expression.

O'Hara studied with John Daido Loori but differences with her teacher led her to begin studying with Taizan Maezumi, who himself was Loori's teacher. It was when she began studying under Taizan Maezumi Roshi that she felt like she found her true teacher and main influencer. It was their shared love of freedom, new experiences, dharma, and love of empowering women that made O’Hara feel a strong connection, often referring to his teaching as feminine.

O'Hara was ordained a Soto priest by Hakuyu Taizan Maezumi in 1995 and received shiho from Bernard Glassman in 1997. In June 2004 Glassman gave O'Hara inka.

She is the abbot emerita and co-founder of the Village Zendo in New York City. She served as co-spiritual director of the Zen Peacemaker Order along with Tetsugen Bernard Glassman. She is also a former professor of interactive media at New York University's Tisch School of the Arts. She holds a doctorate in Media ecology. A socially engaged Buddhist, she is a member of the White Plum Asanga and was involved with the Buddhist AIDS Network.

=== Activism ===
Much of Enkyo's activism has been in the world of HIV/AIDS, from teaching meditation to HIV-positive practitioners to working on prevention strategies among those at risk, and serving as Chairperson of the Board of the National AIDS Interfaith Network. Enkyo, who is a lesbian, has articulated a Zen Buddhist approach to issues dealing with sexuality, race, class, and health.

== Bibliography ==
- O'Hara, Pat Enkyo (2014). Most Intimate: A Zen Approach to Life's Challenges. Shambhala Publications. ISBN 978-1590309742.
- O'Hara, Pat Enkyo (2020). A Little Bit of Zen. Sterling Ethos. ISBN 978-1454940593.
- O'Hara, Pat Enkyo (2011). A Winter Sesshin. Self-Published.

== Gallery ==
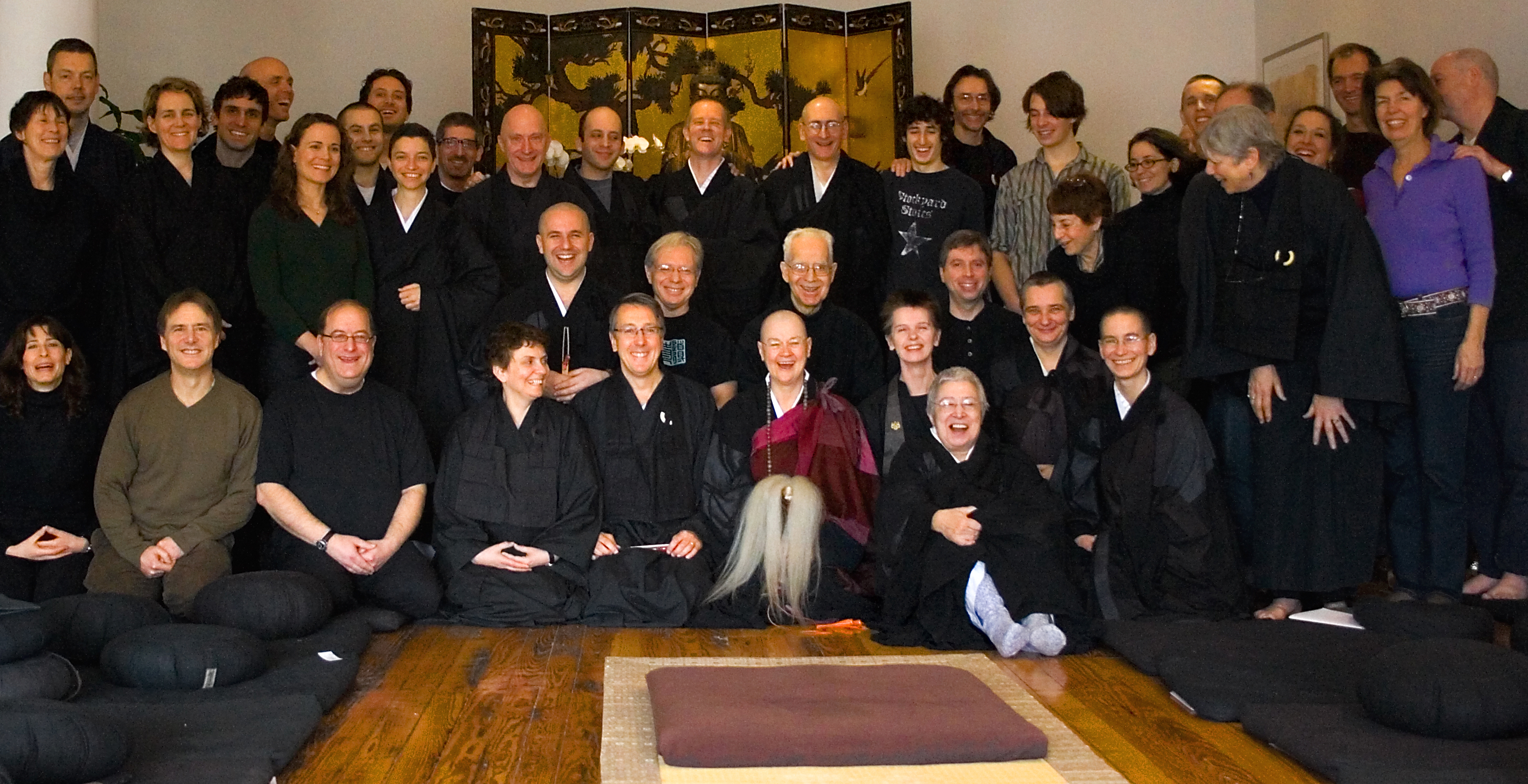
Village Zendo sangha

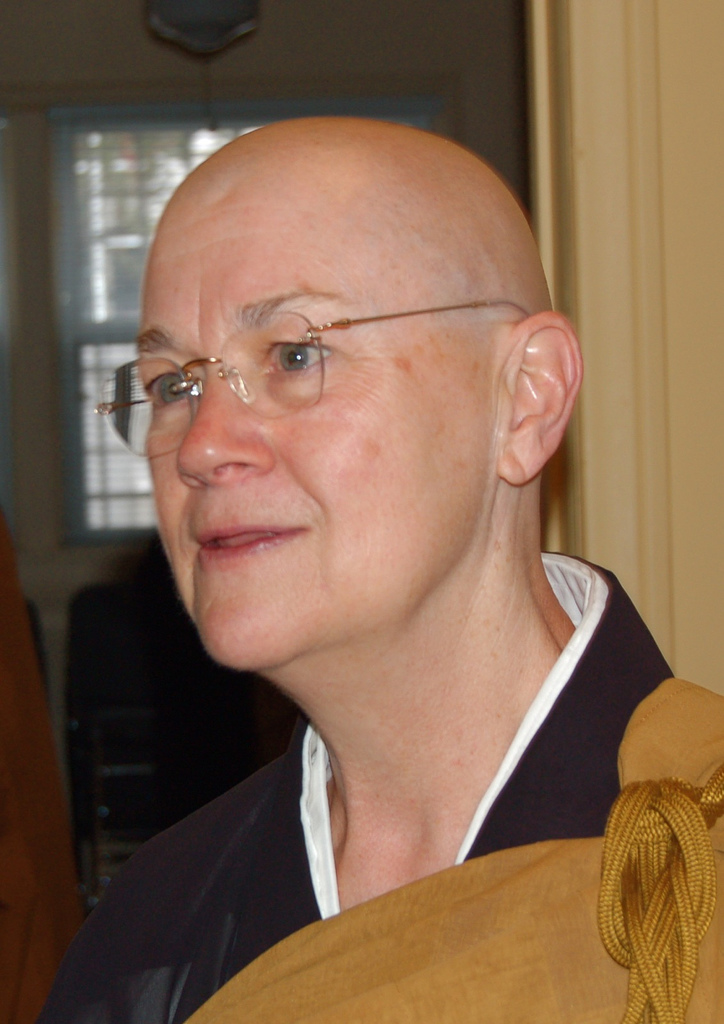

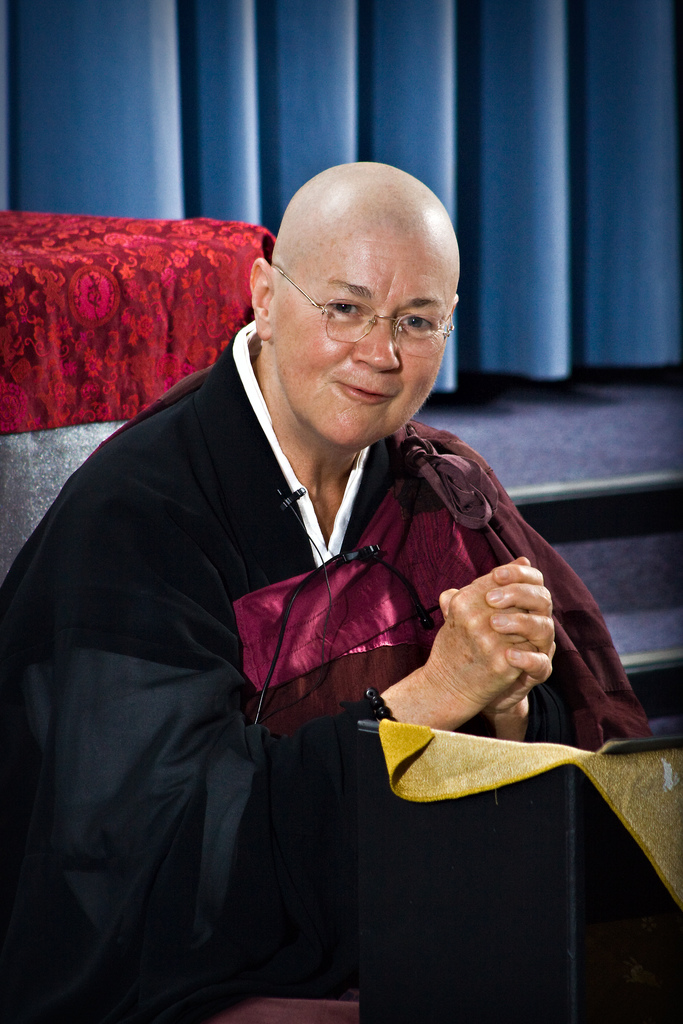

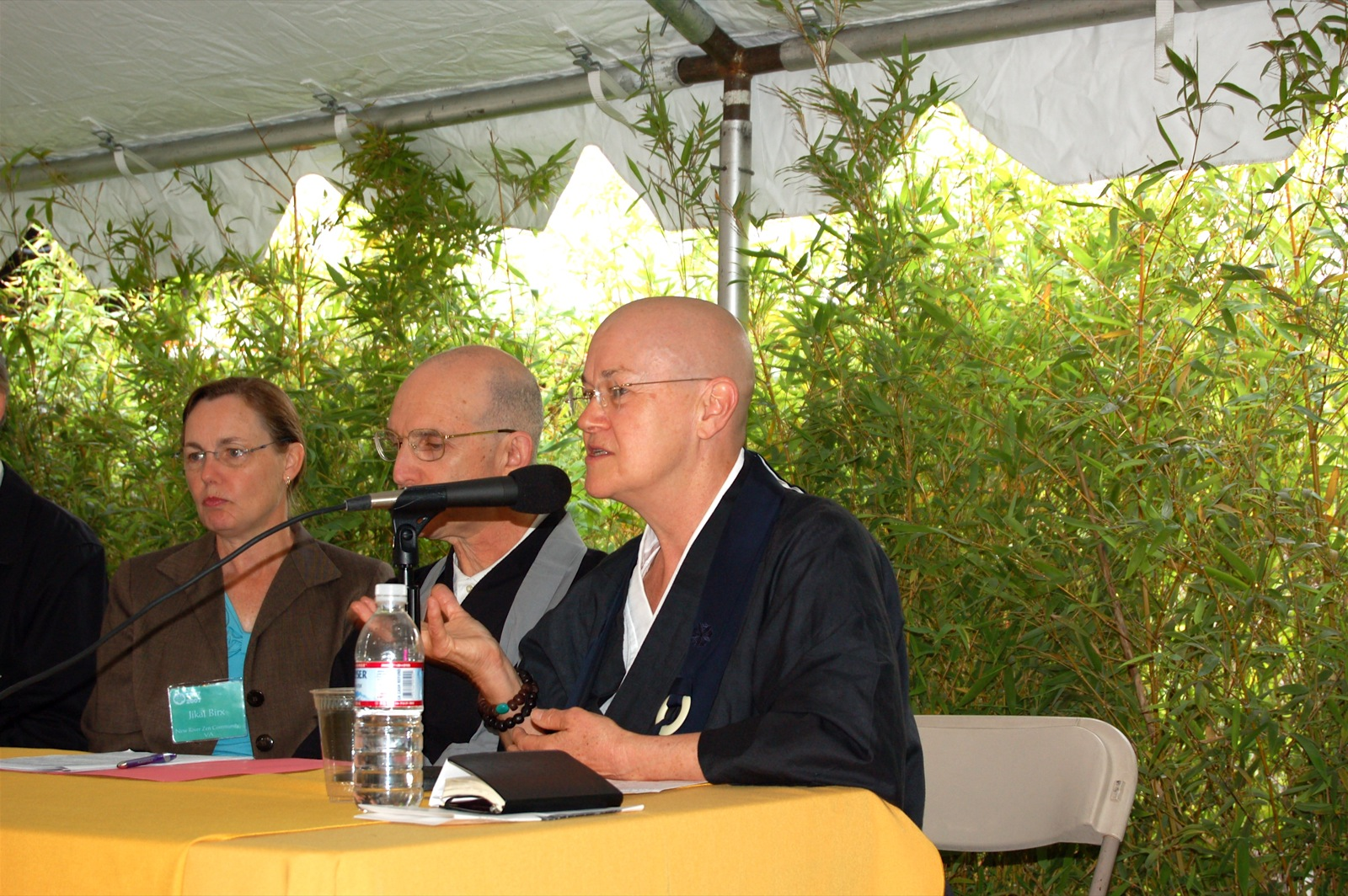

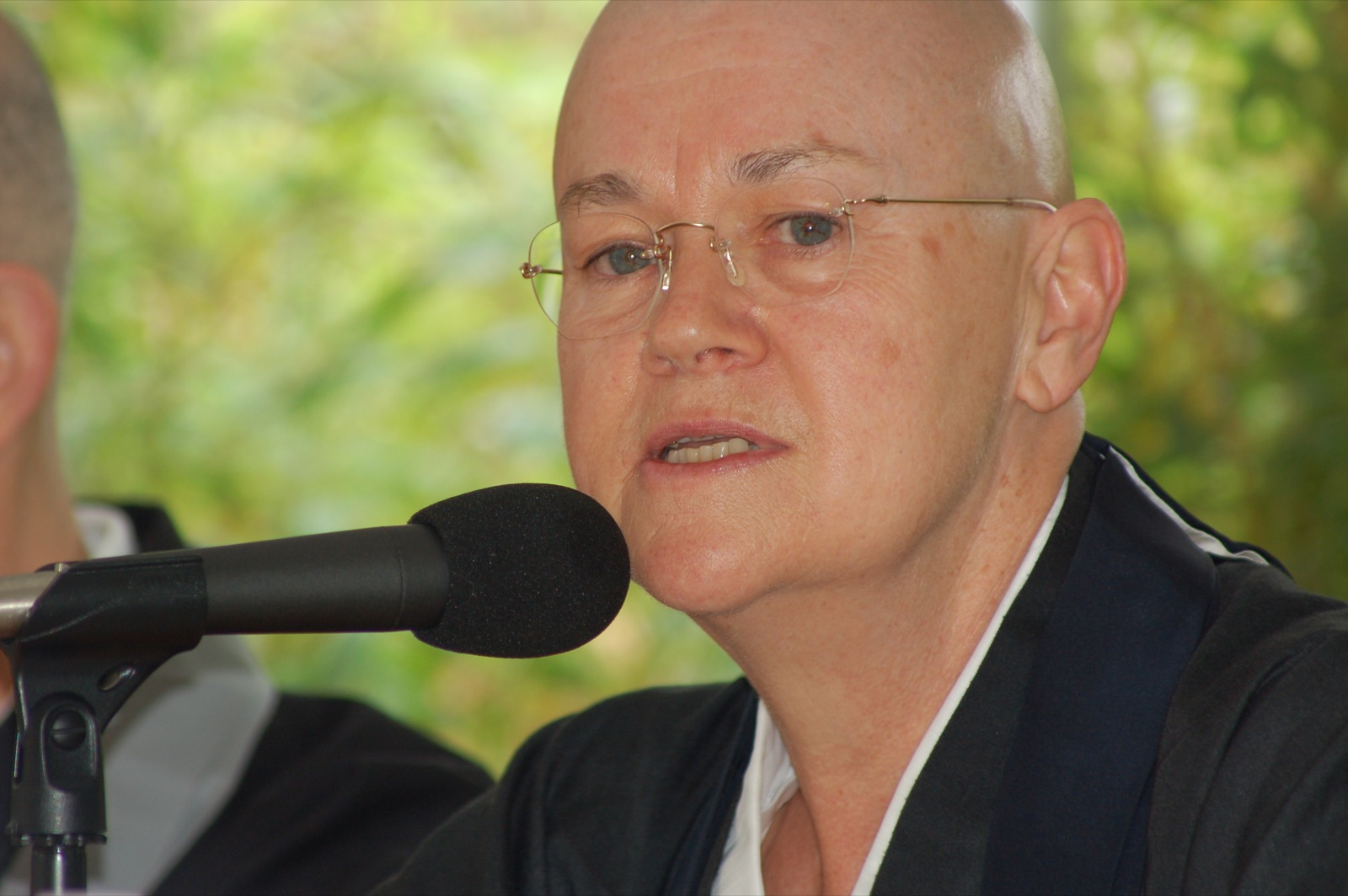

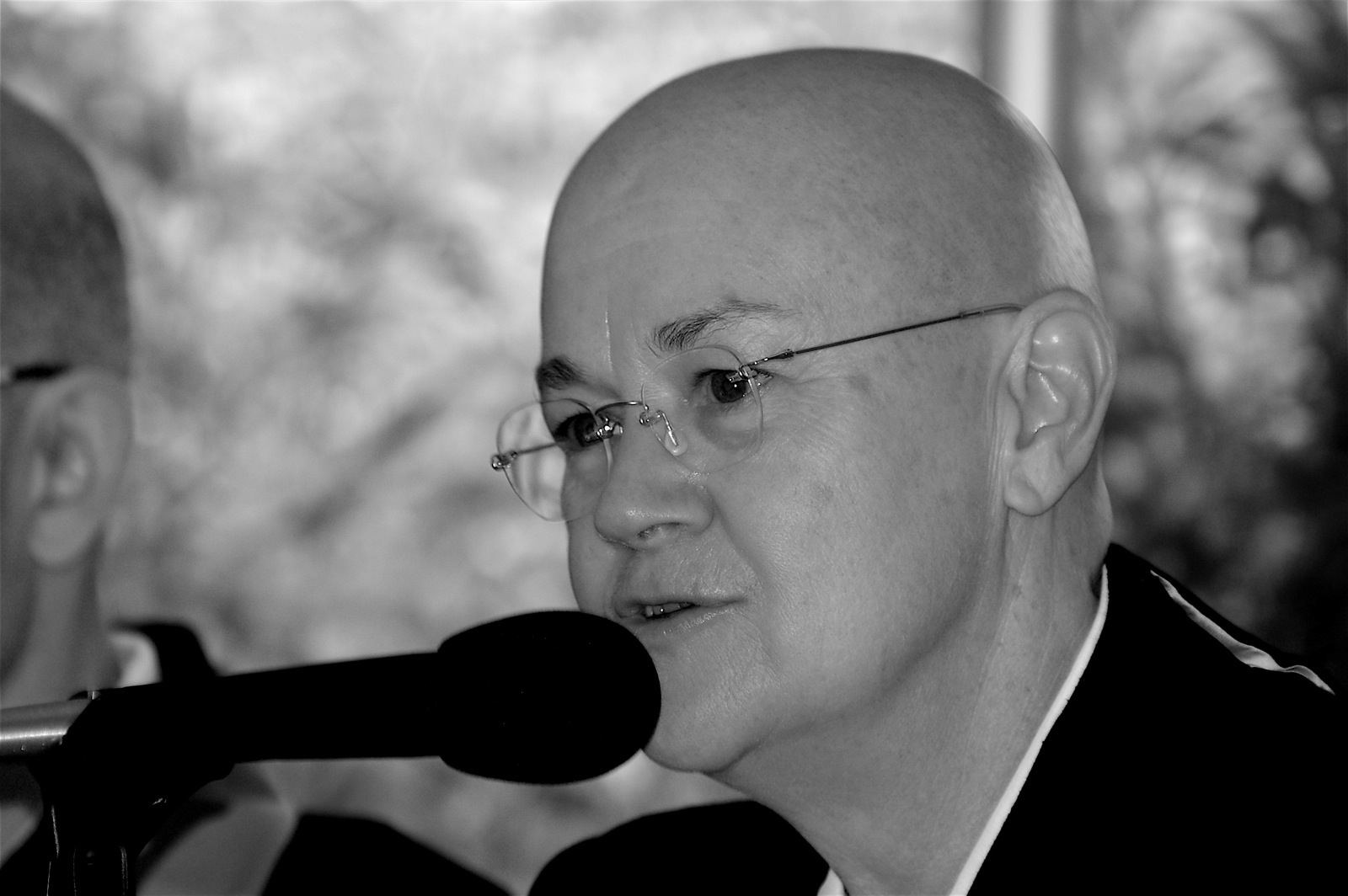

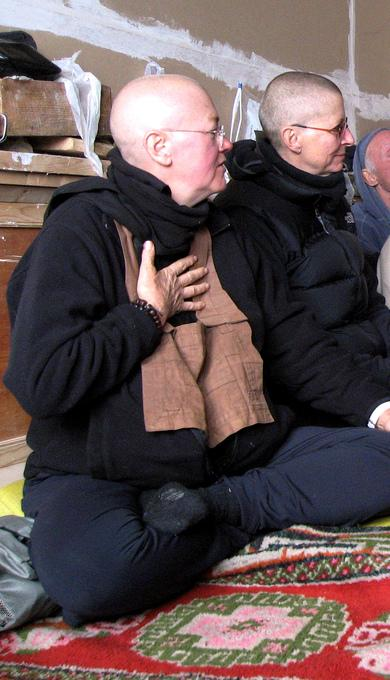
with Joan Halifax

== See also ==
- Buddhism in the United States
- Buddhism and sexual orientation
- Timeline of Zen Buddhism in the United States
