= Robert Kennedy (Jesuit) =

American Jesuit priest

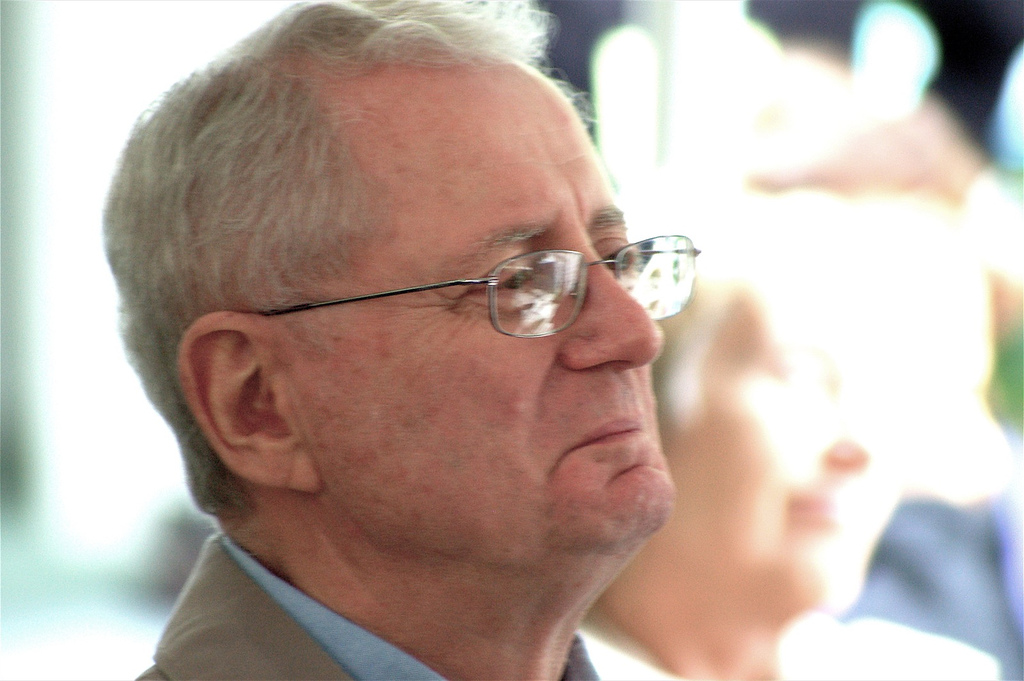
- Born: June 20, 1933 (age 93)
- Other name: Harada Roshi
- Title: Jesuit; Roshi; Psychoanalyst; Professor

Robert Edward Kennedy (born June 20, 1933) is an American Jesuit priest, professor of theology, psychoanalyst and Zen rōshi in the White Plum lineage.

== Life and career ==
Kennedy joined the Jesuits on August 8, 1951. At the end of a long spiritual and academic training he was ordained a priest in Japan in 1965. He studied with Yamada Koun in Japan in the 1970s. He was installed as a Zen teacher of the White Plum Asanga lineage in 1991 and was given the title Roshi in 1997. Kennedy studied Zen with Yamada Roshi in Kamakura, Japan, Maezumi Roshi in Los Angeles and Bernard Glassman Roshi in New York City. Glassman Roshi installed Kennedy as a sensei in 1991 and conferred inka (his final seal of approval) in 1997, making him a roshi (master). Kennedy is currently an elder in the Zen Peacemaker Order founded by Glassman in 1996.

Kennedy was for a time chairperson of the theology department of Saint Peter's College in Jersey City, New Jersey. Currently, he teaches theology and used to teach Japanese. In addition to his work at the college, he is a practicing psychoanalyst in New York City, a representative at the United Nations of the Institute for Spiritual Consciousness in Politics and the author of two books, Zen Spirit, Christian Spirit and Zen Gifts to Christians. He sits with his Zen students daily at the Morning Star Zendo in Jersey City and with students in other zendos located throughout the tri-state area. He conducts weekend and weeklong sesshins (Zen retreats) at various centers in the United States, Mexico, Poland, England, Ireland, and Northern Ireland.

== Dharma successors ==
To date, Kennedy has installed 17 dharma successors: Janet Richardson Roshi, Charles Birx Roshi, Ellen Birx Roshi, Janet Abels Roshi, Ray Cicetti Roshi, Gregory Abels Roshi, Paul Schubert Sensei, Inge von Wobeser-Hopfner Sensei, Patrick Eastman Roshi, Michael Holleran Sensei, Carl Bachmann Roshi, Carl Viggiani Sensei, Miriam Healy Sensei, Kevin Hunt Sensei (a Trappist monk from St. Joseph's Abbey at Spencer, Massachusetts), Cuca Montacel Sensei Tim Butler Sensei, Mary Laheen Sensei, Amy Yee Sensei.

== Bibliography ==
- Kennedy, Robert E. (1984). Psychotherapy and Zen Buddhism in Christian Ministry. Andover Newton Theological School.
- Kennedy, Robert E. (1996). Zen Spirit, Christian Spirit. Continuum International Publishing Group. ISBN 0-8264-0919-9.
- Kennedy, Robert E. (2000). Zen Gifts to Christians. Continuum International Publishing Group. ISBN 0-8264-1654-3.

== Gallery ==
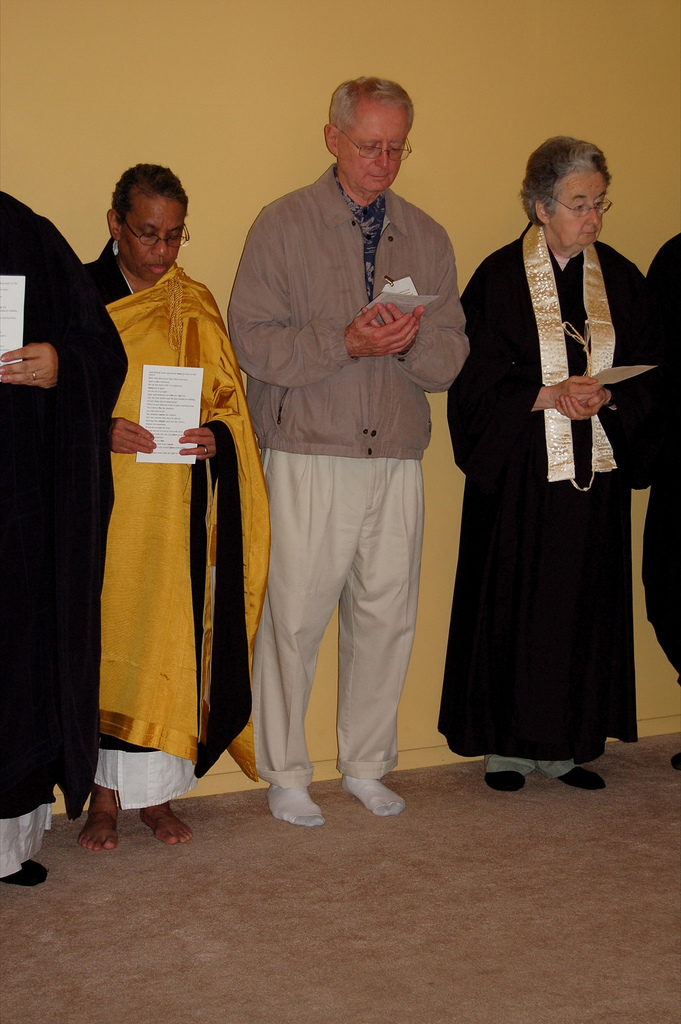
At a memorial service: Kodo sensei, Kennedy, Sister Rose Mary

== See also ==
- Zen Peacemakers
- Ruben Habito
