= Upaya Institute and Zen Center =

Center for residential Zen practice in Santa Fe, New Mexico, US

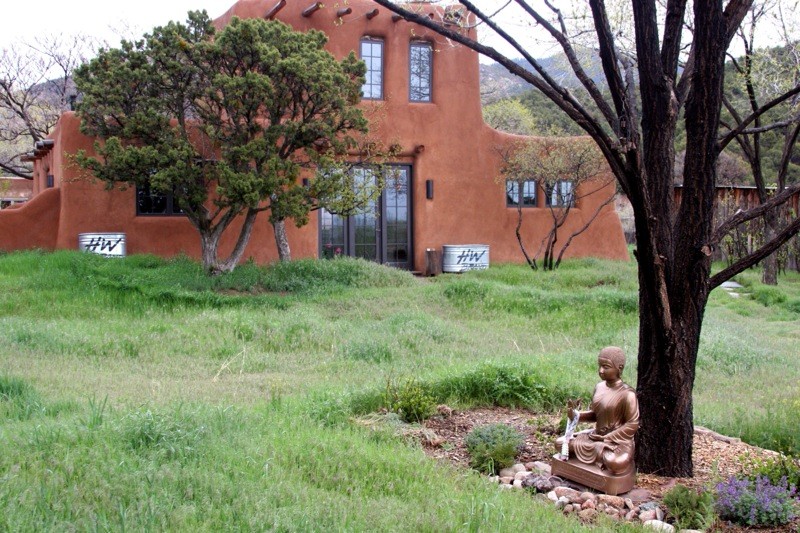

Religion
- Affiliation: Prajna Mountain Buddhist Order; White Plum Asanga

Location
- Location: 1404 Cerro Gordo Road; Santa Fe, New Mexico
- Country: United States
- Interactive map of Upaya Institute and Zen Center
- Coordinates: 35°40′58″N 105°54′28″W

Architecture
- Founder: Joan Halifax

Website
- www.upaya.org

Upaya Institute and Zen Center is a center for residential Zen practice located in Santa Fe, New Mexico, and founded by Joan Halifax Roshi.

== Summary ==
The center focuses on integration of Zen practice with social action, with traditional cultivation of wisdom and compassion in the Buddhist sense. It also provides service in the areas of death and dying, prison work, environment, women's rights and peace work. According to the Upaya website, in 2002 Joan Halifax founded the Prajna Mountain Buddhist Order. A non-profit organization, Prajna is a new Buddhist Order in the lineage of Taizan Maezumi Roshi, the Zen Peacemaker Order and White Plum Asanga.

=== Residency ===
Upaya offers residency for aspiring Zen practitioners. The resident program is intended for people who wish to practice and learn while living in community at Upaya. A 4 month program with the possibility of making a long term commitment is offered.

== Gallery ==
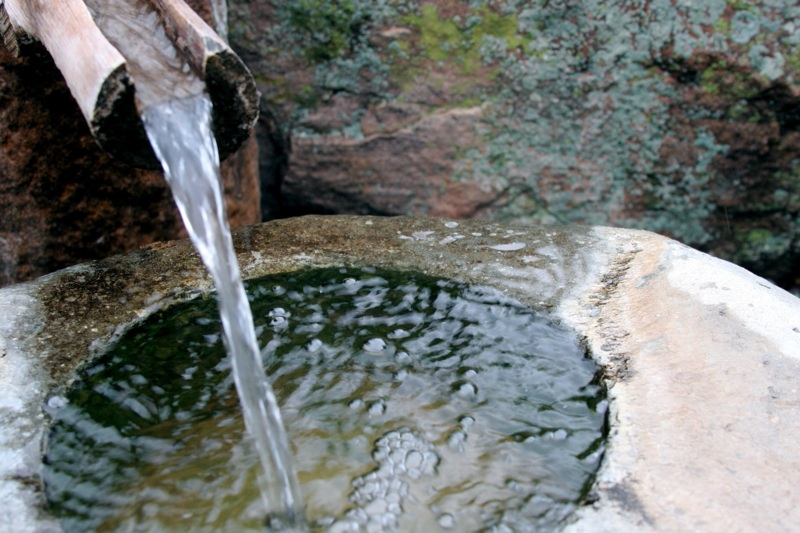

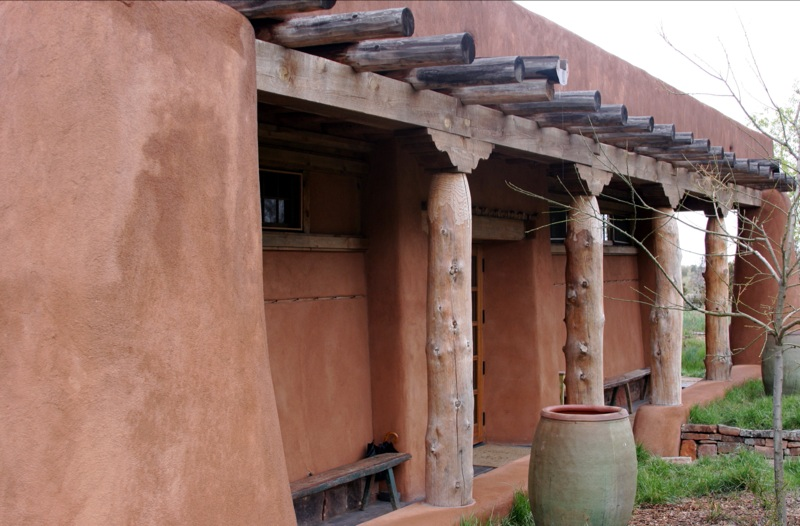

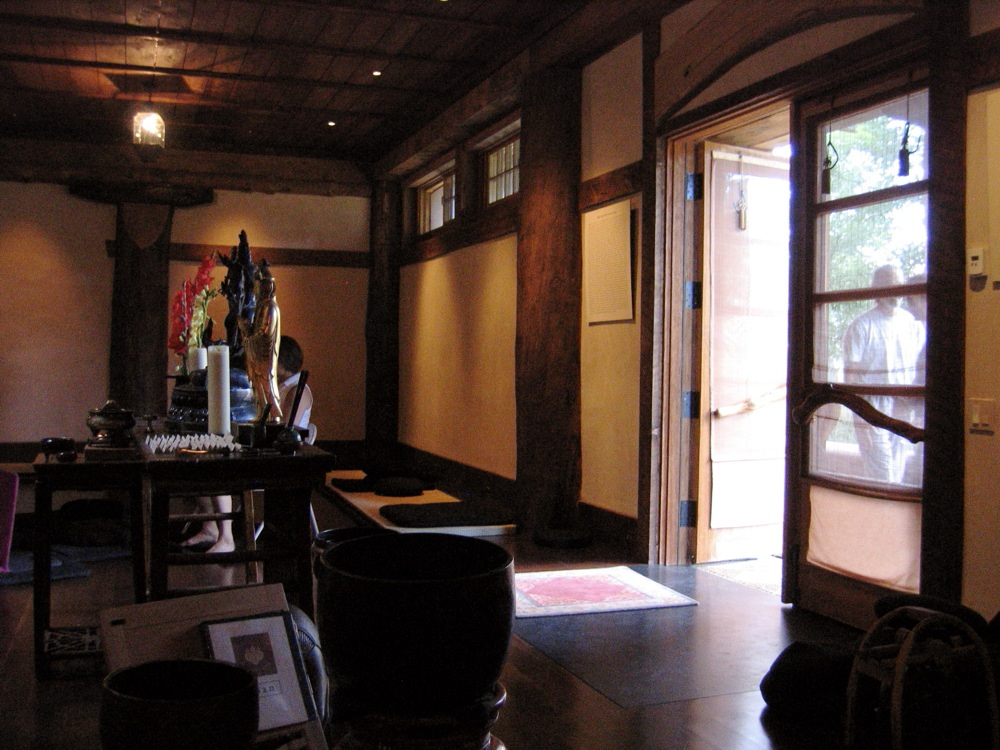

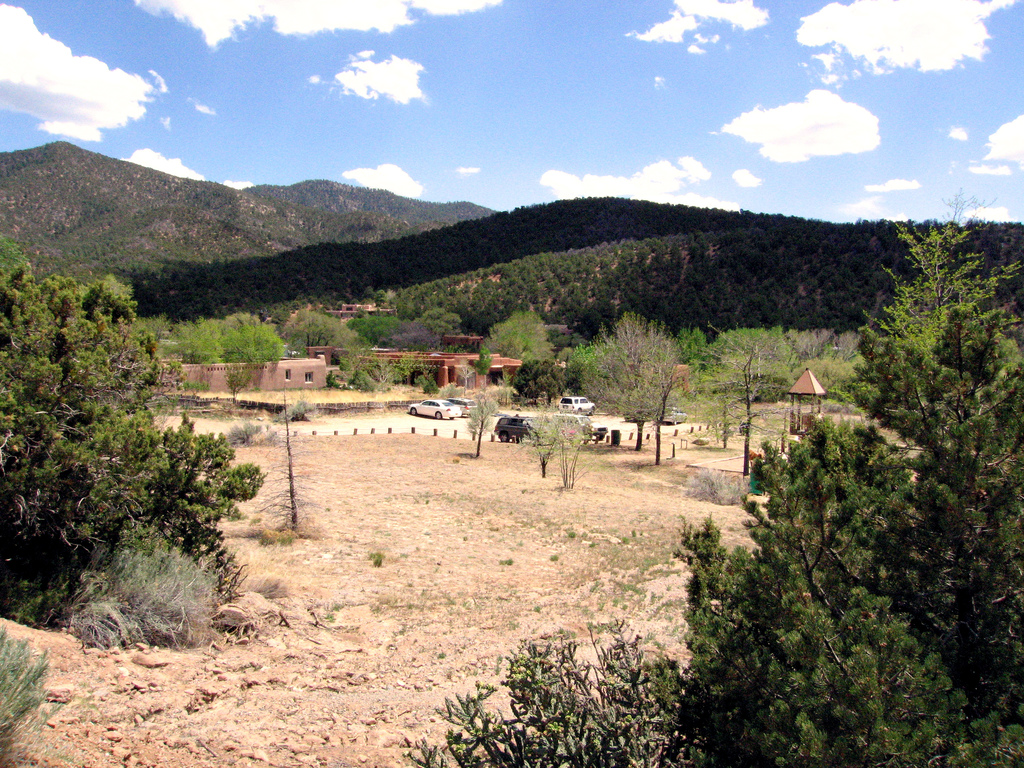

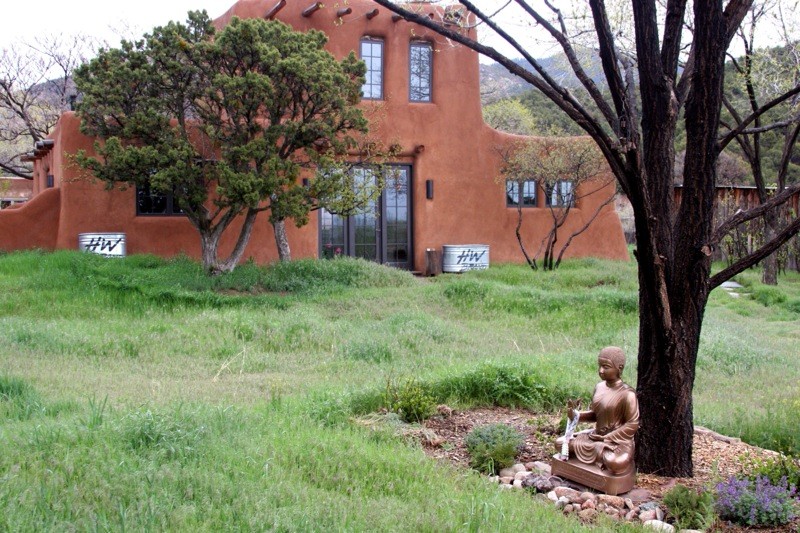

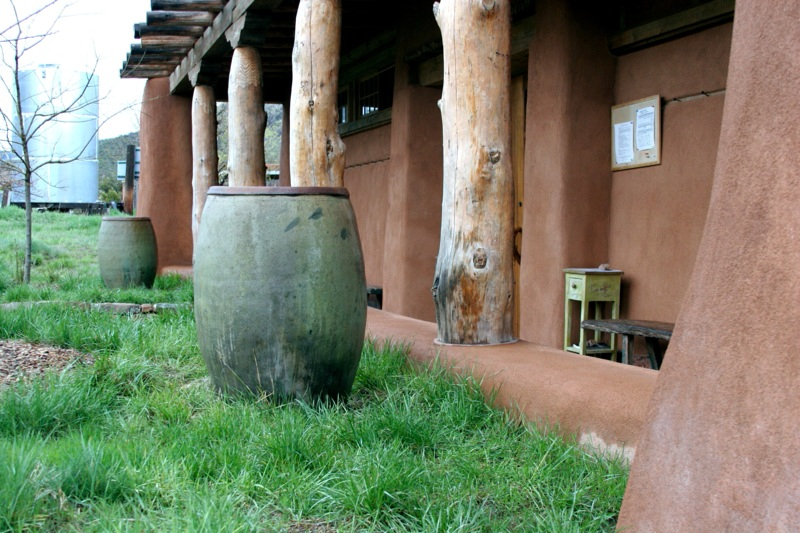

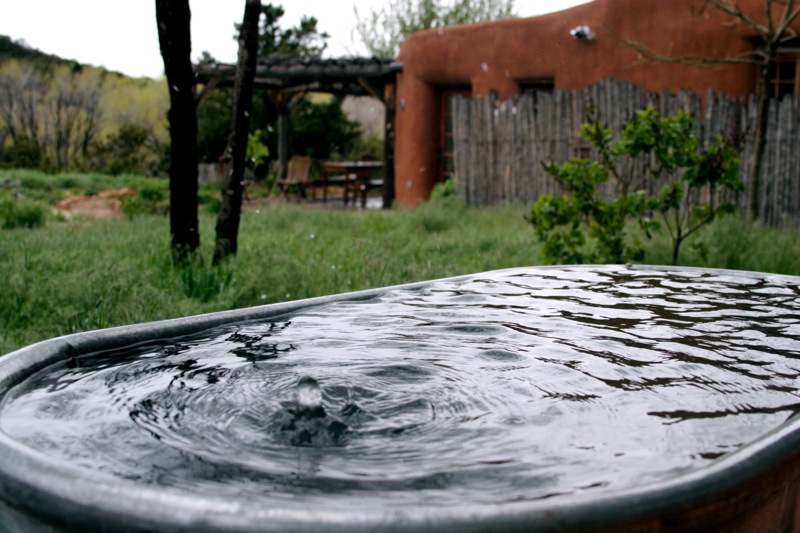

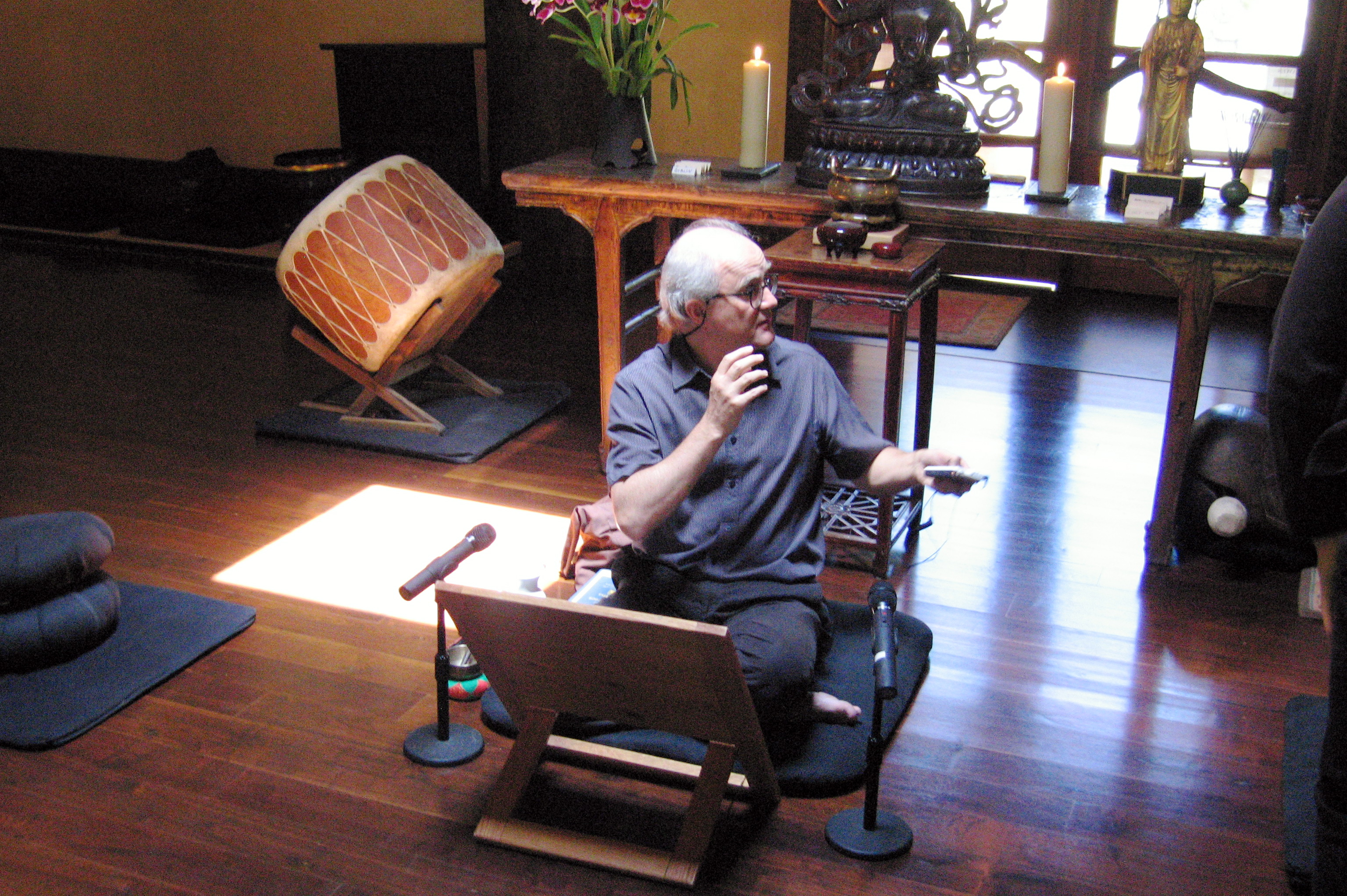

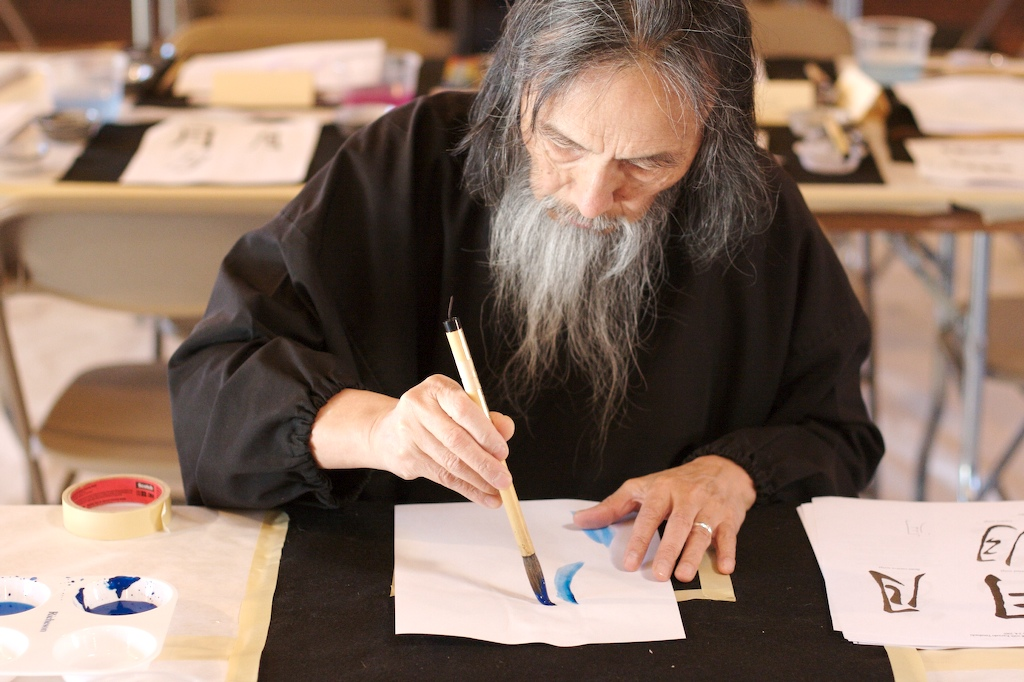

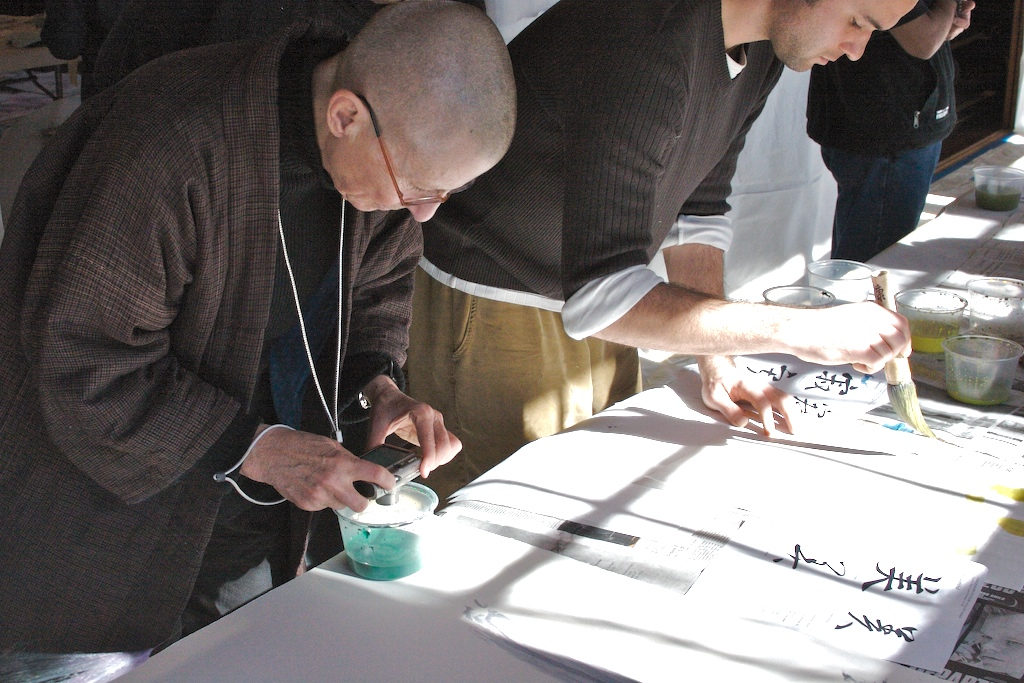

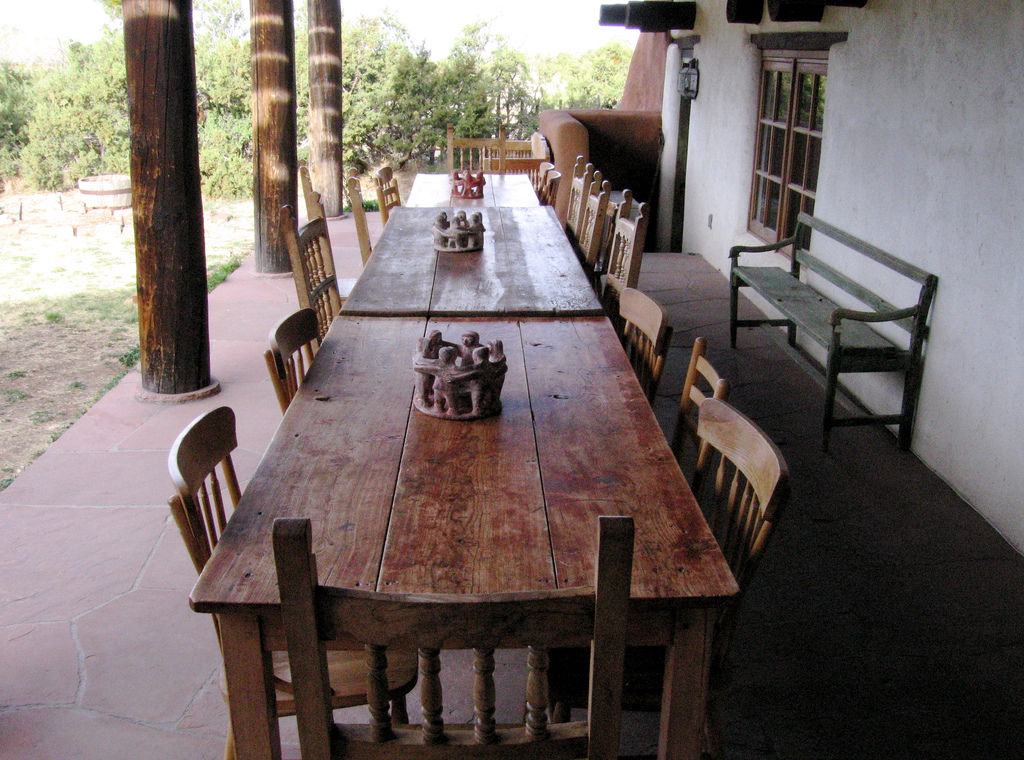

== See also ==
- Buddhism in the United States
- Timeline of Zen Buddhism in the United States
