= White Plum Asanga =

Zen organization

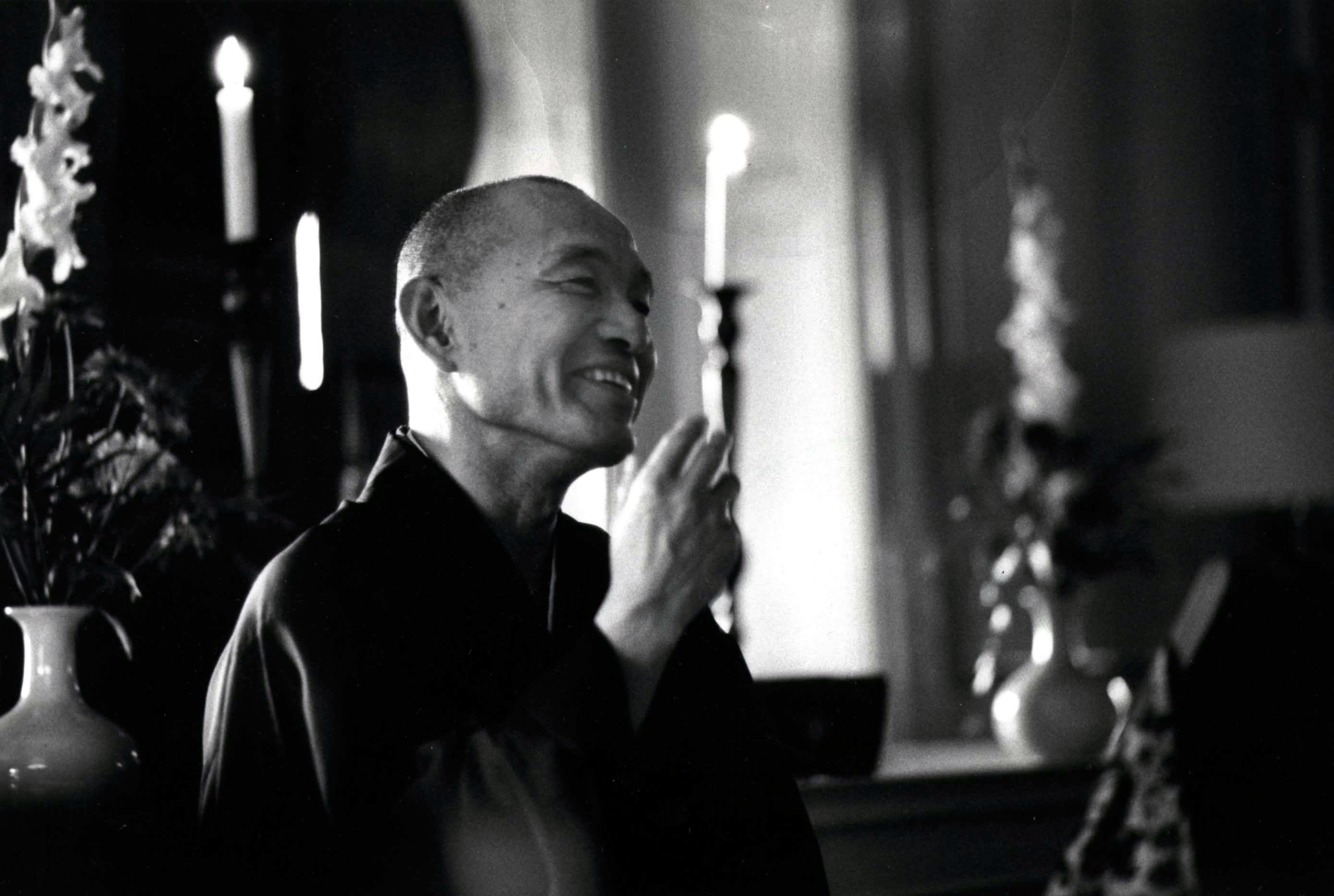
Taizan Maezumi

White Plum Asanga is an organization of Zen teachers in the lineage of Hakuyu Taizan Maezumi. It was created by Maezumi and Tetsugen Bernard Glassman, and consists of Maezumi's Dharma heirs and successors.

== History ==
The White Plum Asanga was conceived of informally in 1979 by Maezumi and Glassman, and was named after Maezumi's father, Baian Hakujun Dai-osho. The name "White Plum" reflects the Japanese elements haku ("white") and bai ("plum") in his name. The organization took shape around Maezumi's dharma lineage; a 2020 interview with Kipp Ryodo Hawley described it as beginning with Maezumi and his first two successors, Glassman and Dennis Genpo Merzel.

White Plum was incorporated in 1995 as a non-profit following Maezumi's death. Glassman was the White Plum Asanga's first president and was succeeded by Merzel. Merzel later resigned as a member of White Plum.

A diverse organization spread across the United States and with a small presence in Europe, the White Plum Asanga has been described as including teachers who represent a range of American Zen styles, including socially engaged Buddhism, family practice, Zen and the arts, secularized Zen, and progressive traditionalism.

In a 2009 article for Tricycle: The Buddhist Review, Sean Murphy described the White Plum Asanga as "the largest single lineage network of Zen teachers in the West". Murphy reported that it included about 80 teachers and characterized it as an affinity association for formally sanctioned teachers in Maezumi's lineage, rather than a body responsible for certifying or disciplining teachers. In 2026, the organization reports 261 members.

In a 2010 paper on the organization, Franz Metcalf described ambiguity around the names "White Plum Asanga" and "White Plum Sangha", but identified White Plum Asanga as the organization's name. Metcalf noted that most lineage websites used "White Plum Asanga" and that the organization's own website did not identify it as White Plum Sangha. He quoted Gerry Shishin Wick as saying that "White Plum Sangha" had been used during Glassman's presidency, and explained that asanga means "without attachment", a play on words chosen by Glassman and Maezumi.

In a 2020 interview with Water Wheel, the publication of the Zen Center of Los Angeles, Kipp Ryodo Hawley said his term as president of the board had begun that year. Hawley distinguished the board presidency from leadership of the overall organization, saying that as White Plum had grown larger and more diverse, "there is no longer one person at the head". He also described board elections as membership votes for three-year terms and said that individual teachers, rather than Zen centers, belong to the Asanga.

As of June 2026, Kipp Ryodo Hawley is the president.

== Partial list of notable members ==
Notable members listed publicly by White Plum include:

- Susan Myoyu Andersen
- Jan Chozen Bays
- Charles Tenshin Fletcher
- Joan Jiko Halifax
- Diane Musho Hamilton
- Kipp Ryodo Hawley (president)
- Robert Jinsen Kennedy
- Wendy Egyoku Nakao
- Pat Enkyo O'Hara
- Anne Seisen Saunders (past president)
- Daniel Doen Silberberg
- Gerry Shishin Wick (past president)
- John Gendo Wolff
- Michael David Zimmerman

In memoriam:

- Merle Kodo Boyd
- Tetsugen Bernard Glassman (co-founder, first president)
- John Daido Loori
- Hakuyū Taizan Maezumi (White Plum lineage source)
- Peter Muryo Matthiessen

Former:

- Dennis Genpo Merzel (past president)

== Partial list of affiliated Zen centers that practice in the White Plum lineage ==
Although membership in the White Plum Asanga is held by individual teachers rather than Zen centers, a number of Zen centers are led by teachers in Maezumi's lineage.

- Upaya Institute and Zen Center
- Zen Center of Los Angeles
- Zen Mountain Monastery
- Village Zendo
- Great Vow Zen Monastery
- New York Zen Center for Contemplative Care
- Two Arrows Zen

=== Past ===
- Kanzeon Zen Center

== See also ==
- Buddhism in the United States
- Timeline of Zen Buddhism in the United States

== Sources ==
- Maezumi, Taizan; Glassman, Bernard (2002). On Zen Practice: Body, Breath, Mind. Wisdom Publications. ISBN 0-86171-315-X. OCLC 49822921.
- Prebish, Charles S.; Baumann, Martin (2002). Westward Dharma: Buddhism Beyond Asia. University of California Press. ISBN 0-520-22625-9. OCLC 48871649.
- Prebish, Charles S (1999). Luminous Passage: The Practice and Study of Buddhism in America. University of California Press. ISBN 0-520-21697-0.
- Tucker, Mary Evelyn (1997). Buddhism and Ecology: The Interconnection of Dharma and Deeds. Harvard University Press. ISBN 0-945454-13-9.
