= Joan Halifax =

American Zen Buddhist roshi, anthropologist, ecologist, and civil rights activist

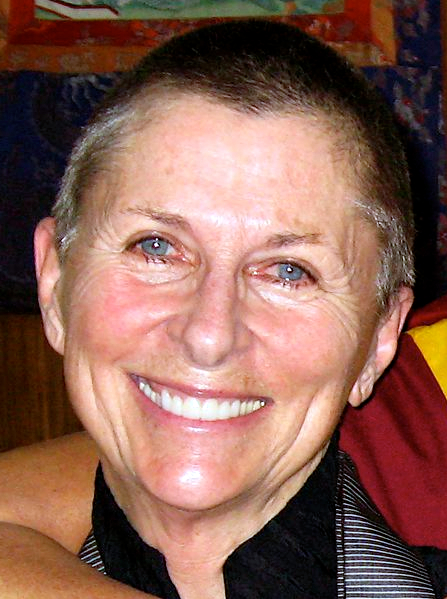
- Halifax in February 2008

Personal life
- Born: July 30, 1942 (age 84) Hanover, New Hampshire, U.S.
- Education: Harriet Sophie Newcomb College at Tulane University; University of Miami School of Medicine; Union Graduate School

Religious life
- Religion: Zen Buddhism
- Lineage: Zen Peacemaker Order; White Plum Asanga

Senior posting
- Teacher: Seung Sahn, Bernard Glassman, Thich Nhat Hanh
- Based in: Upaya Zen Center

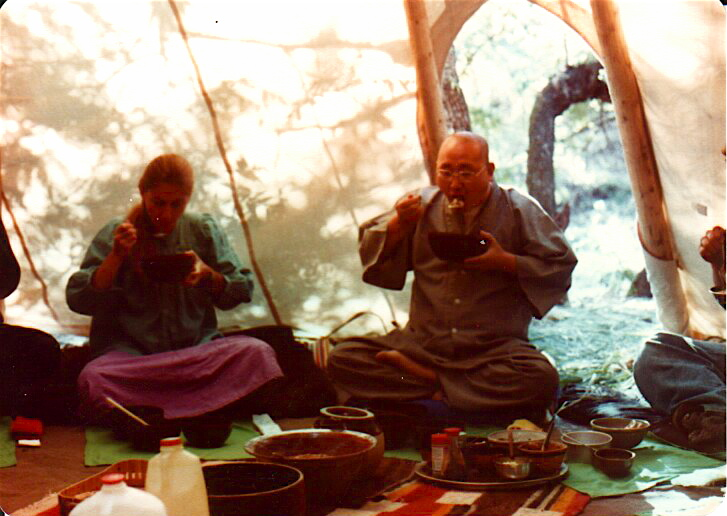
Joan with Seung Sahn Soen Sa Nim at the Ojai Foundation in 1979.

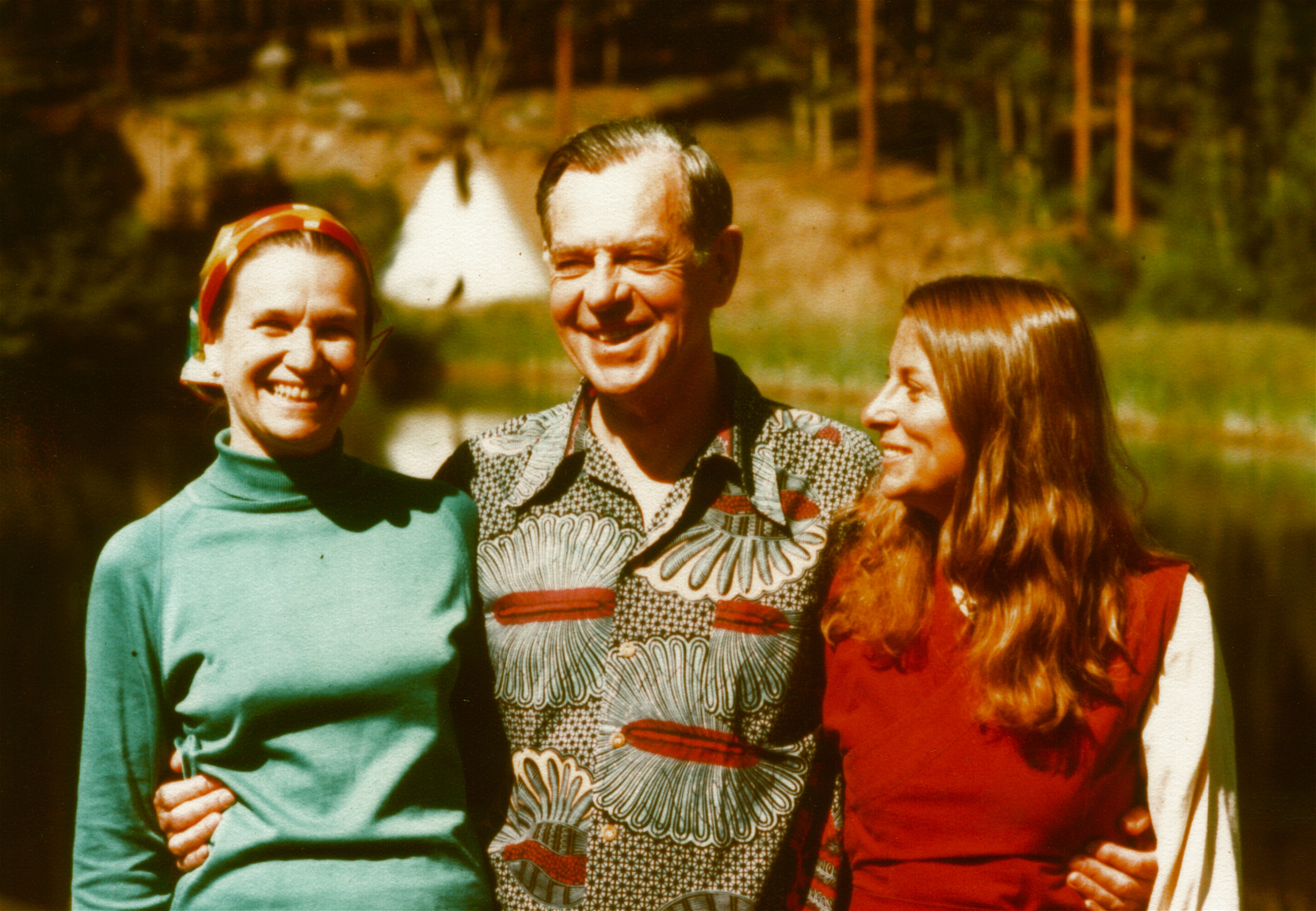
Left to right: Jean Erdman, Joseph Campbell and Joan, at Feathered Pipe Ranch, Montana, late 1970s

Joan Jiko Halifax (born July 30, 1942) is an American Zen Buddhist teacher, anthropologist, ecologist, civil rights activist, hospice caregiver, and the author of several books on Buddhism and spirituality. She serves as an abbot and guiding teacher of Upaya Zen Center in Santa Fe, New Mexico, a Zen Peacemaker community she founded in 1990. Halifax has received Dharma transmission from Bernard Glassman, and previously studied with the Korean zen master Seung Sahn.

In the 1970s she collaborated on LSD research projects with her ex-husband Stanislav Grof, in addition to other collaborative efforts with Joseph Campbell and Alan Lomax. She is founder of the Ojai Foundation in California, which she led from 1979 to 1989. As a socially engaged Buddhist, Halifax has done extensive work with the dying through her Project on Being with Dying (which she founded). She is on the board of directors of the Mind and Life Institute, a non-profit organization dedicated to exploring the relationship of science and Buddhism.

== Biography ==
Joan Halifax was born in Hanover, New Hampshire in 1942. At age four a serious virus caused her to go legally blind, from which she recovered two years later. In 1964 she graduated from Harriet Sophie Newcomb College at Tulane University in New Orleans, Louisiana, where she had become drawn into the American civil rights movement and participated in anti-war protests. Halifax moved to New York City and began working with Alan Lomax, and by 1965 she was reading books on Buddhism and teaching herself how to meditate. She worked at the Bureau of Applied Social Research at Columbia University with Alan Lomax from 1964 to 1968. She then went to Paris and worked at the Museum of Man in the Ethnographic Film Section. She received her Ph.D. from Union Institute & University at Cincinnati in medical anthropology and psychology and worked at the University of Miami School of Medicine. She also went to Mali, where she studied the indigenous Dogon tribe. During the 1970s, Halifax went to Mexico to study the Huichols.

Halifax entered a relatively short-lived marriage with Stanislav Grof in 1972. While together, the two examined the use of LSD as a support mechanism for those dying, jointly publishing the book The Human Encounter With Death in 1977. The book discusses several "rebirth" incidents which are rather similar to regular reports of near death experiences.

In 1979, Halifax founded the Ojai Foundation, an educational and interfaith center. In 1990 Halifax founded Upaya Zen Center located in Santa Fe, New Mexico. The center offers Zen training, in addition to various courses and retreats on topics such as engaged Buddhism and caring for the dying. According to author Sarah Buie, Upaya is, "...a residential and teaching center on the outskirts of Santa Fe on the site of earlier Buddhist communities. While proceeding in an organic and incremental way, integrating existing structures into the Upaya campus, Joan's vision for its present form has been comprehensive. It is based on her deep understanding of the consonance of mind and spatial expressions. She considers our condition of interrelatedness and interdependence (ties to ancestors and traditional uses of the land, natural cycles and resources, placing sites within the local topography of mountain and river, the interdependence of exterior and interior spaces, and relationships with the community itself) in the design choices she has made. Caring stewardship of the land and its resources has been a constant factor in the development of the site.

Halifax has done extensive work with the dying over her career. Professor Christopher S. Queen writes—in the book Westward Dharma (edited by Charles S. Prebish and Martin Baumann), "She teaches the techniques of 'being with death and dying' to a class of terminally ill patients, doctors, nurses, lovers, family, and friends. She speaks calmly, with authority. In a culture where death is an enemy to be ignored, denied, and hidden away, Joan physically touches the dying. She holds them, listens to them, comforts them, calms them, and eases their suffering by any means possible. She shares their thoughts and fears; she feels their last shuddering breaths, holding them in her arms. She travels easily from church to synagogue, hospice to hospital, dispensing techniques and training born of Buddhist traditions and beliefs in a culturally and spiritually flexible manner."

In March 2011, she was appointed a distinguished visiting scholar at the John W. Kluge Center, Library of Congress.

== Works ==
=== Books ===
- Halifax, Joan (1968). Trance in Native American Churches. OCLC 26412971.
- Grof, Stanislav; Halifax, Joan (1977). The Human Encounter with Death. E.P. Dutton. ISBN 0-525-12975-8. OCLC 2633012.
- Halifax, Joan (1982). Shaman, the Wounded Healer. Crossroad. ISBN 0-8245-0066-0. OCLC 8667806.
- Halifax, Joan (1991). Shamanic Voices: A Survey of Visionary Narratives. Arkana. ISBN 0-14-019348-0. OCLC 27975715.
- Halifax, Joan (1993). The Fruitful Darkness: Reconnecting With the Body of the Earth. HarperSanFrancisco. ISBN 0-06-250369-3.
- Halifax, Joan (1998). A Buddhist Life in America: Simplicity in the Complex. Paulist Press. ISBN 0-8091-3785-2. OCLC 37837453.
- Halifax, Joan (2008). Being with Dying: Cultivating Compassion and Fearlessness in the Presence of Death. Boston; Boulder: Shambhala, 2008. ISBN 1590307186
- Halifax, Joan (2018). Standing at the Edge: Finding Freedom Where Fear and Courage Meet. New York: Flatiron Books, 2018.

=== Other media ===
Audio

- Halifax, Joan (1987). Thorns and Roses Living Mindfully. New Dimensions Foundation. OCLC 16185539.
- Halifax, Joan (1997). Being With Dying. Sounds True. ISBN 1-56455-493-7. OCLC 37529532.

Video

- Omega Institute for Holistic Studies (1992). Elder As Healer With Joan Halifax. Panacea Productions. OCLC 28118179.
