= Greyston Bakery =

Social enterprise in Riverdale, New York

Coordinates: 40.941053°N 73.900404°W

- Type: Social enterprise
- Industry: Baked goods
- Founded: Bronx, New York, U.S. (1982)
- Founder: Tetsugen Bernard Glassman
- Headquarters: Yonkers, New York
- Key people: Joseph D. Kenner, CEO & President
- Products: Ice cream mix-ins, brownies, cakes
- Number of employees: 78 (2020)
- Parent: Greyston Foundation
- Website: greyston.org

Greyston Bakery was founded in Riverdale, New York, by Bernie Glassman, a Zen Buddhist. Although it is a for-profit company, its profits go to its non-profit parent organization, the Greyston Foundation, where they are used on behalf of the local community.

== History ==
The bakery was founded in 1982. Later that decade, Ben Cohen of Ben & Jerry's ice cream company agreed to purchase Greyston Bakery brownies for chocolate fudge brownie ice cream. In 2004, Greyston Bakery moved to a larger facility designed by Maya Lin to accommodate growth. In 2012, Greyston Bakery became New York State's first registered benefit corporation.

== Social mission ==
The company aims to hire the hard-to-employ and is known for its "open hiring" practices, where anyone can sign up regardless of background. All profit from the company go to the Greyston Foundation, which uses it for low-income housing, day care open to the community, a medical center for those with AIDS, and other community endeavors.

The hiring process at the bakery is via a first-come, first-served waiting list. There are no background checks or interviews. When a name gets to the top of the list after a number of months, that person is offered a paid apprenticeship, initially at slightly above minimum wage. The apprenticeship lasts six or more months, as required to train the employee. At the successful completion of the apprenticeship (reached by about 40% of new hirees), the employee is given a permanent position. The company claims that apprentice training costs them $1,900 per employee, compared to $1,400 typically spent in recruiting and vetting expenses, and that employee turnover is comparable with other businesses in the industry.

Greyston has a social worker on-site to assist employees solve problems, such as transportation issues, child care, and housing, which may interfere with their work.

== Products ==
Greyston Bakery is the primary supplier of brownies for Ben & Jerry's, which is its main client. The bakery also has its own line of baked goods that it sells online and a co-branded line of products with Whole Planet Foundation sold exclusively at Whole Foods Market.
