= Bernie Glassman =

American Buddhist teacher

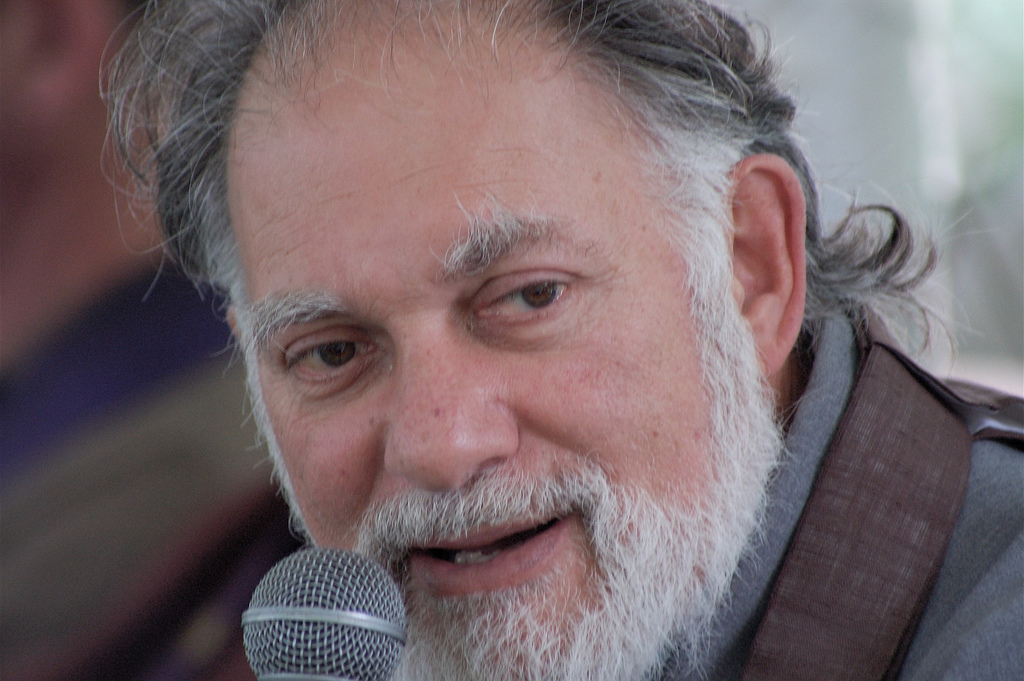
- Title: Roshi

Personal life
- Born: Bernard Glassman; January 18, 1939 Brighton Beach, Brooklyn, New York, U.S.
- Died: November 4, 2018 (aged 79) Springfield, Massachusetts, U.S.
- Spouse: Eve Marko
- Education: Brooklyn Polytechnic Institute; University of California, Los Angeles
- Other name: Bernie Glassman
- Website: zenpeacemakers.org

Religious life
- Religion: Buddhist
- School: Zen Peacemaker Order
- Lineage: White Plum Asanga
- Dharma name: Tetsugen

Senior posting
- Predecessor: Taizan Maezumi
- Successor: Joan Halifax; Father Robert Kennedy; Wendy Egyoku Nakao; Pat Enkyo O'Hara; Lou Nordstrom; Don Singer; Grover Genro Gauntt; Anne Seisen Saunders; Francisco "Paco" Lugoviña; Barbara Salaam Wegmueller; Roland Yakushi Wegmueller

Bernie Glassman (January 18, 1939 – November 4, 2018) was an American Zen Buddhist roshi, aeronautical engineer and founder of the Zen Peacemakers (previously the Zen Community of New York), an organization established in 1980. In 1996, he co-founded the Zen Peacemaker Order with his late wife, Sandra Jishu Holmes. Glassman was a Dharma heir of the late Taizan Maezumi-roshi, and gave inka and Dharma transmission to several people.

Glassman was known as a pioneer of social enterprise, socially engaged Buddhism, and "Bearing Witness Retreats" at Auschwitz and on the streets with homeless people.

According to author James Ishmael Ford, in 2006 he

...transferred his leadership of the White Plum Asanga to his Dharma brother Merzel Roshi and has formally "disrobed," renouncing priesthood in favor of serving as a lay teacher.

== Biography ==
Bernie Glassman was born to Jewish immigrants in Brighton Beach, Brooklyn, New York, in 1939. He attended university at the Brooklyn Polytechnic Institute and received a degree in engineering. Following graduation, he moved to California to work as an aeronautical engineer at McDonnell-Douglas. He then received his Ph.D. in applied mathematics from the University of California, Los Angeles.

Glassman first encountered Zen when he was assigned Huston Smith's The Religions of Man for an English class in 1958. From there, he continued with books by Alan Watts, Christmas Humphreys, and D.T. Suzuki. In the early 1960s, Glassman began meditating, soon thereafter seeking a local Zen teacher. He found Taizan Maezumi in Los Angeles, California, and Glassman became one of the original founding members of the Zen Center of Los Angeles. He received Dharma transmission in 1976 from Maezumi, who intended to create an inka shomei ceremony for him in 1995, shortly before Maezumi's death, conferring the influences of his own teachers to Glassman.

In 1980, he founded the Zen Community of New York. In 1982, Glassman opened Greyston Bakery in Yonkers, New York, which initially provided jobs for the Zen students but evolved into an effort to help alleviate the widespread homelessness in the area. The bakery provided jobs for inner city residents who lacked education and skills. Greyston employed low-skilled workers from the neighborhood, many of whom were homeless themselves, and sold baked goods to shops and restaurants in Manhattan. In 1989, Glassman entered an agreement with Ben & Jerry's, and Greyston Bakery became the supplier of brownies for several lines of ice cream.

Through the success of his bakery—which earned $12 million in revenues in 2016—Glassman founded the Greyston Foundation (sometimes called Greyston Mandala) with his wife, Sandra Jishu Holmes, in 1989. He retired from the Greyston Foundation in 1996 to pursue socially engaged Buddhist projects through the Zen Peacemakers. As of 2004, the Foundation had developed $35 million worth in real estate development projects in Westchester County, New York. The Foundation offers HIV/AIDS programs, provides job training and housing, child care services, educational opportunities, and other endeavors. In 2003, the bakery moved to a new building, which allowed for higher output and more employment opportunities.

In 1996, Glassman founded the Zen Peacemaker Order with his wife, Sandra Jishu Holmes. Professor Christopher S. Queen states, "The order is based on three principles: plunging into the unknown, bearing witness to the pain and joy of the world, and a commitment to heal oneself and the world." Richard Hughes Seager wrote, "The Zen Peacemaker Order...has the potential to rival Thich Nhat Hanh's groups and the Buddhist Peace Fellowship as a force in American activism."

In 2012, Glassman founded The Stone Soup Cafe in Greenfield, Massachusetts (originally the "Let All Eat Cafe" in Montague) with Academy Award-winning actor Jeff Bridges. Glassman and Bridges created an environment at the Stone Soup Café that promotes dignified treatment and accessibility for all. They designed the meal experience to ensure patrons felt attended to at a relaxed pace, nourishing the body, mind, and soul. Influenced by the Zen Peacemakers' principles, the café operates on a pay-what-you-can model, fostering a mixed-income dining experience that unites individuals from diverse backgrounds.

Glassman died on November 4, 2018, from complications of a stroke, in Springfield, Massachusetts, at the age of 79.

== Teachings ==
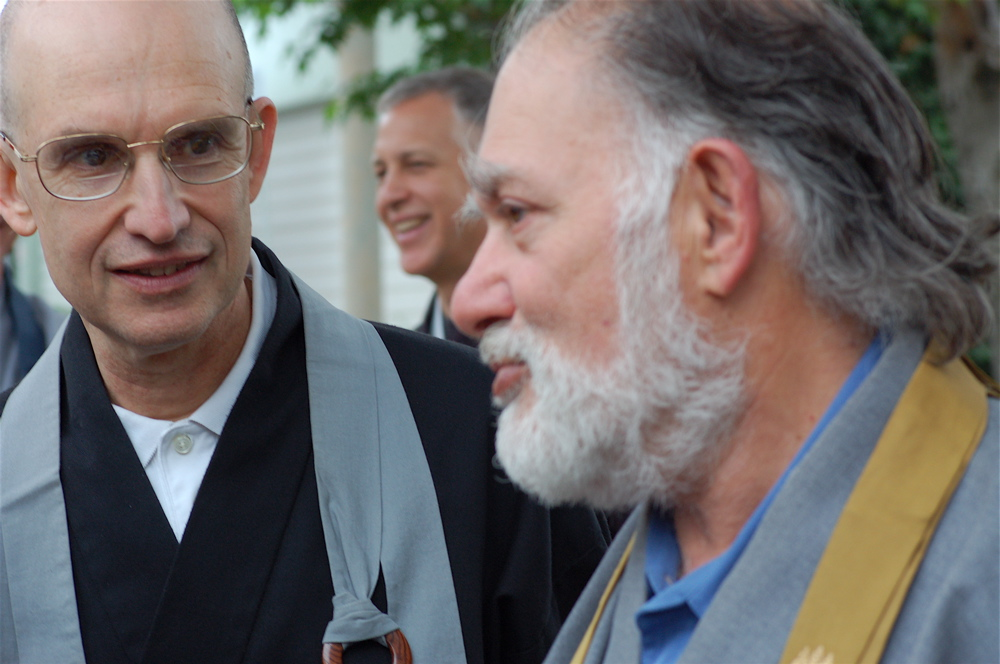
Bernie Glassman with Elihu Genmyo Smith

Glassman taught about what his teacher, the late Taizan Maezumi, called the "unknowing." Not-knowing is the first tenet of the Zen Peacemakers, and Glassman said of it, "In Zen the words source and essence are the equivalent of Unknowing, and they come up again and again. We have the absolute and the relative perspectives about life, and Unknowing is the one source of both of these." Also, Glassman was known for his many "street retreats." Author James Ishmael Ford writes, "...'street retreats,' for instance, moves sesshin into the streets: participants eat in soup kitchens, and, if they know they're not displacing homeless people, sleep in homeless shelters or, otherwise, sleep in public places. Zazen takes place in parks." In the 2000s, Glassman developed an experiment in sociocratic consensus-based zen training and interfaith facilitation, known initially as Peacemaker Circle International and later Zen Peacemaker Circles. Interconnected projects were established globally, replacing the role of 'Zen teacher' with participants learning from each other and sharing ideas between Circles. Starting in 2001, Glassman taught "Clowning Your Zen" workshops with Moshe Cohen, and founded a "clown order" called the Order of Disorder within the Zen Peacemaker Order. In his last years, having disrobed from the priesthood, Glassman together with his third wife Eve Marko continued the work of his teacher Koryu Osaka Roshi in developing lay forms of Zen practice.

== Lineage ==
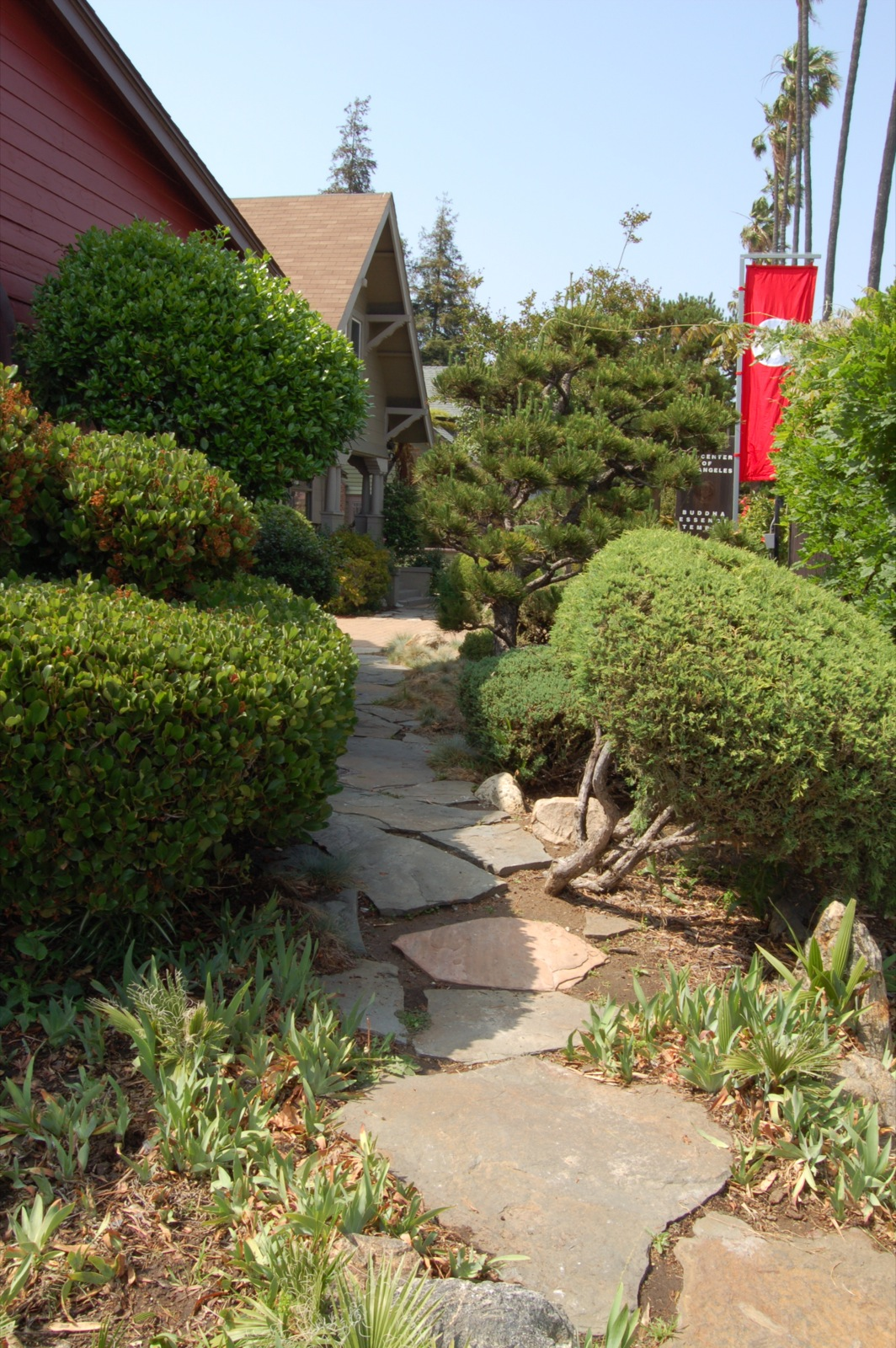
Zen Center of Los Angeles

Bernie Glassman appointed several "senseis" and "roshis" in traditional zen, and established the non-hierarchical roles of 'Steward' and 'Circle Dharmaholder' as coordinators and visionholders to continue the Zen Peacemaker Circles model. A number of his successors have also given dharma transmission to some of their own students.

== Bibliography ==
- Bridges, Jeff; Glassman, Bernie (2013). The Dude and the Zen Master. Blue Rider Press. ISBN 978-0399161643.
- Maezumi, Taizan; Glassman, Bernie (2007). The Hazy Moon of Enlightenment: Part of the On Zen Practice Series. Wisdom Publications. ISBN 978-0-86171-314-1. OCLC 73742251.
- Glassman, Bernie (2002). Infinite Circle: Teachings in Zen. Shambhala Publications. ISBN 1-57062-591-3.
- Maezumi, Taizan; Glassman, Bernie (2002). On Zen Practice: Body, Breath, Mind. Wisdom Publications. ISBN 0-86171-315-X. OCLC 49822921.
- Glassman, Bernie (1998). Bearing Witness: A Zen Master's Lessons in Making Peace. Bell Tower. ISBN 0-609-80391-3.
- Glassman, Bernard; Fields, Rick (1996). Instructions to the Cook: A Zen Master's Lessons in Living a Life That Matters. Bell Tower. ISBN 0-517-88829-7.

== Other media ==
=== Audio ===
Glassman, Bernard; Fields, Rick (1996). Instructions to the Cook: A Zen Master's Lessons in Living a Life That Matters. Shambhala Lion Editions. ISBN 1-57062-260-4. OCLC 35811026.

=== Video ===
- Wegmüller, Roland (documentarian). Japan Tour of Temples, Monasteries and Tradition.
- Wold, Christof (director) (2006). Instructions to the Cook: A Zen Master's Lessons in Living a Life That Matters. Loyola Productions Munich GmbH. ISBN 3-939926-00-0. OCLC 182060644.
- Gregory, Peter (director) (2004). Gate of Sweet Nectar: Feeding Hungry Spirits in an American Zen Community. Zen Center of Los Angeles. OCLC 56132158.
- O'Keefe, Michael (director) (2001). Raising the Ashes. Polonia Films. OCLC 51062604.
- Eich, George (director) (1999). Zen on the Street. Project Ananda Productions. OCLC 51062219. Archived from the original on December 26, 2005.

== Selected honors ==
- 1991 Best of America Award for Social Action, U.S. News & World Report
- Ethics in Action Award, Ethical Culture Society of Westchester
- E-chievement Award, E-Town, Tom's of Maine
- Man of the Year, Westchester Coalition of Food Pantries
- 2016 Babson College Lewis Institute Social Innovator Award

== Selected board participation ==
- The Temple of Understanding
- White Plum Asanga
- AIDS Interfaith National Network
- Social Venture Network
- Westchester Interfaith Housing Corp.

== See also ==
- List of peace activists
