= Buddhism in the United States =

Buddhism in the United States refers to the diverse Buddhist communities, traditions, and practices found in the United States. Buddhism was first established in the country through Asian immigrant communities in the 19th century, especially Chinese and Japanese immigrants, and later expanded through additional immigration from Buddhist-majority countries in East, Southeast, and South Asia. Since the late 19th and 20th centuries, Buddhism has also attracted non-Asian American converts and practitioners through interest in meditation, philosophy, Zen, Tibetan Buddhism, Theravada, and other traditions.

American Buddhism includes immigrant and heritage Buddhist communities, convert Buddhist communities, and organizations with origins in Asia that actively expanded in the United States. Major traditions represented in the country include Japanese Pure Land, Nichiren, Zen, Tibetan Buddhism, Theravada, Chinese Buddhism, Korean Seon, Vietnamese Thiền. Scholars have noted that these categories can overlap and that Buddhist identity in the United States is complicated: some people identify culturally or religiously as Buddhist, while others participate in meditation or Buddhist communities without adopting the label “Buddhist.”

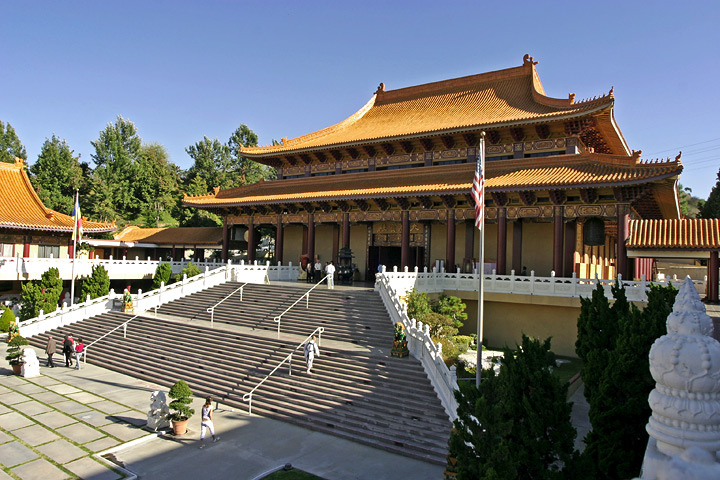
Covering 15 acres (61,000 m^{2}), California's Hsi Lai Temple is one of the largest Buddhist temples in the western hemisphere.

Services at the Hompa Hongwanji Buddhist Temple, Los Angeles, around 1925

== Statistics ==
=== U.S. states by Buddhist population ===
State(s)	Buddhist population (%)
Hawaii	8
California	2
Alaska, Arizona, Colorado, Connecticut, Illinois, Kansas, Louisiana, Maine, Maryland, Massachusetts, Michigan, Missouri, Montana, New Mexico, New York, Ohio, South Dakota, Tennessee, Texas, Utah, Vermont, Virginia, Washington, Wyoming	1

The Buddhist population rapidly increased in the 1960s with the change in Asian immigration law to the United States. By the 1980s, multiple Buddhist communities began to sprout throughout the country.

=== Buddhism in American Overseas territories ===
The following is the percentage of Buddhists in the U.S. territories as of 2010:

Territory	Percent
American Samoa	0.3%
Northern Mariana Islands	10.6%
Guam	1.1%
Puerto Rico	<1%
US Virgin Islands	unknown

== Types of Buddhism in the United States ==
Three broad types of American Buddhism are found in the United States:

1. The oldest and largest of these is "immigrant" or "ethnic Buddhism", those Buddhist traditions that came to America with immigrants who were already practitioners and that largely remained with those immigrants and their descendants.
2. The next oldest and arguably the most visible group Prebish refers to as "import Buddhists", because they came to America largely in response to interested American converts who sought them out, either by going abroad or by supporting foreign teachers; this is sometimes also called "elite Buddhism" because its practitioners, especially early ones, tended to come from social elites.
3. A trend in Buddhism is "export" or "evangelical Buddhist" groups based in another country who actively recruit members in the US from various backgrounds. Modern Buddhism is not just an American phenomenon.

This typology has been the subject of debate among scholars who have noted the problematic nature of equating "ethnic" Buddhists with Asian immigrants which elides the ethnicity or cultural specificity of white American Buddhists.

== Immigrant Buddhism ==
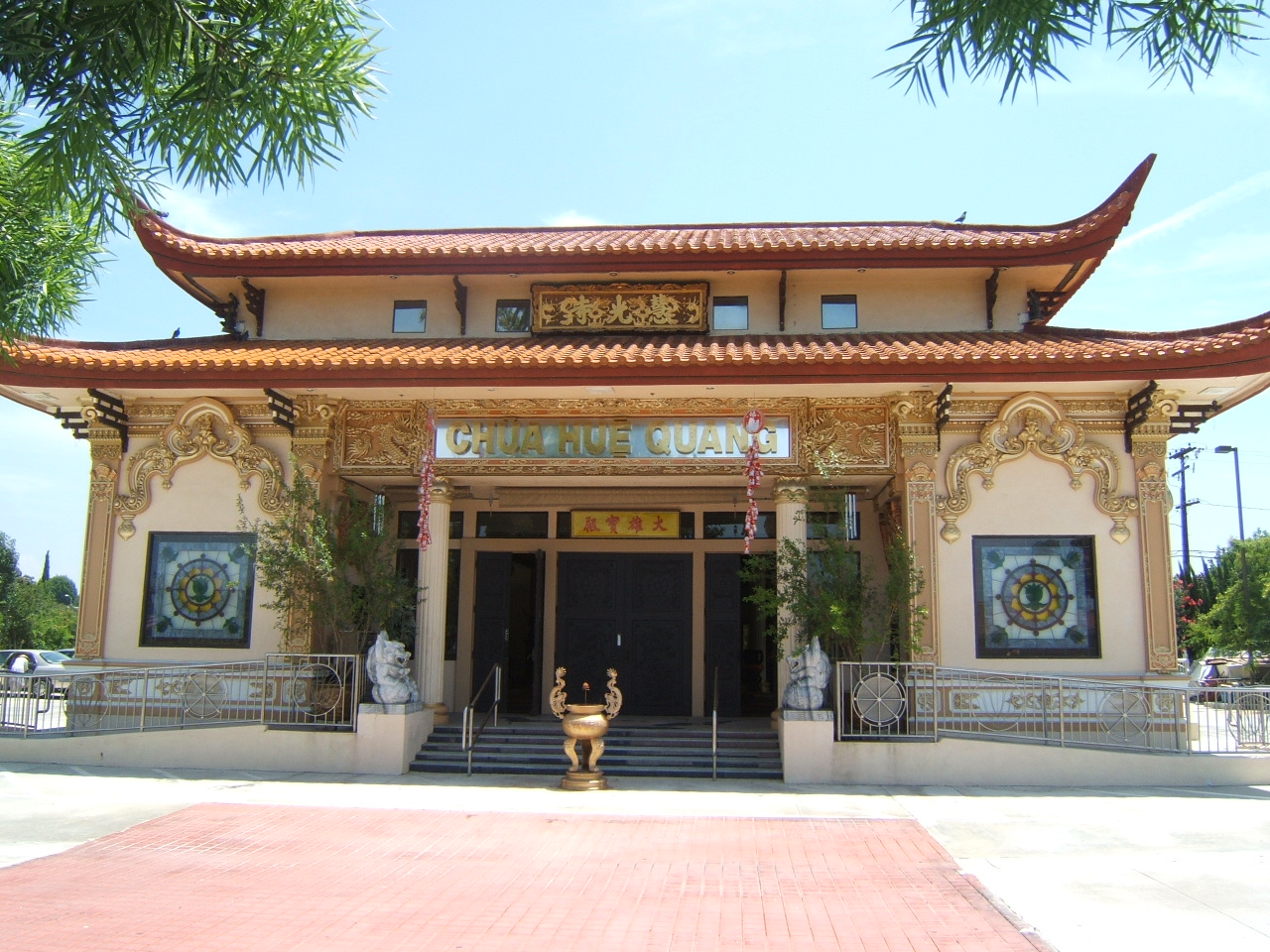
Chùa Huệ Quang Buddhist Temple, a Vietnamese American temple in Garden Grove

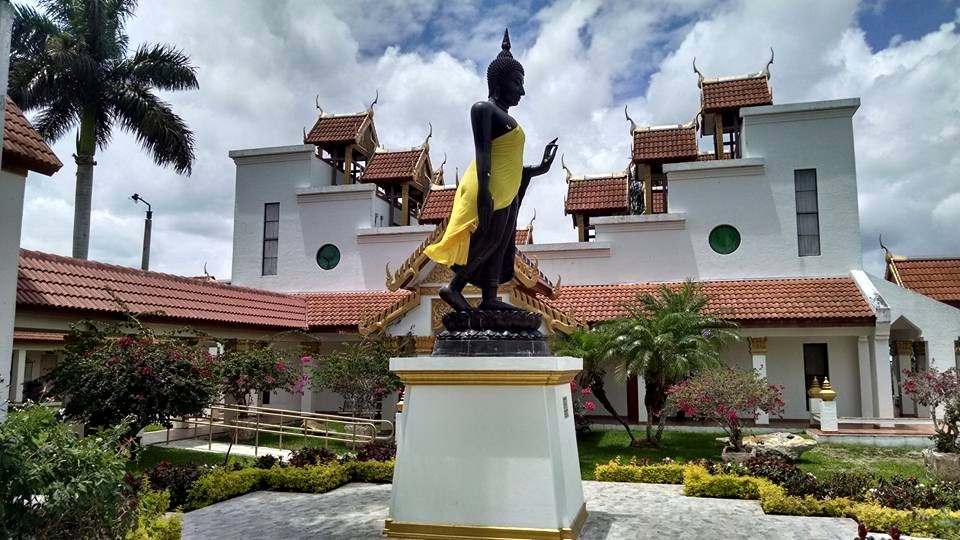
Wat Buddharangsi Buddhist Temple of Miami

Buddhism was introduced into the US by Asian immigrants in the 19th century, when significant numbers of immigrants from East Asia began to arrive in the New World. In the United States, immigrants from China entered around 1820, but began to arrive in large numbers following the 1849 California Gold Rush.

Immigrant Buddhist congregations in North America are as diverse as the different peoples of Asian Buddhist extraction who settled there. The US is home to Sri Lankan Buddhists, Chinese Buddhists, Japanese Buddhists, Korean Buddhists, Thai Buddhists, Cambodian Buddhists, Vietnamese Buddhists and Buddhists with family backgrounds in most Buddhist countries and regions. The Immigration Act of 1965 increased the number of immigrants arriving from China, Vietnam and the Theravada-practicing countries of Southeast Asia.

=== Chinese immigration ===
The first Buddhist temple in America was built in 1853 in San Francisco by the Sze Yap Company, a Chinese American fraternal society. Another society, the Ning Yeong Company, built a second in 1854; by 1875, there were eight temples, and by 1900 approximately 400 Chinese temples on the west coast of the United States, most of them containing some Buddhist elements. Unfortunately a casualty of racism, these temples were often the subject of suspicion and ignorance by the rest of the population, and were dismissively called joss houses.

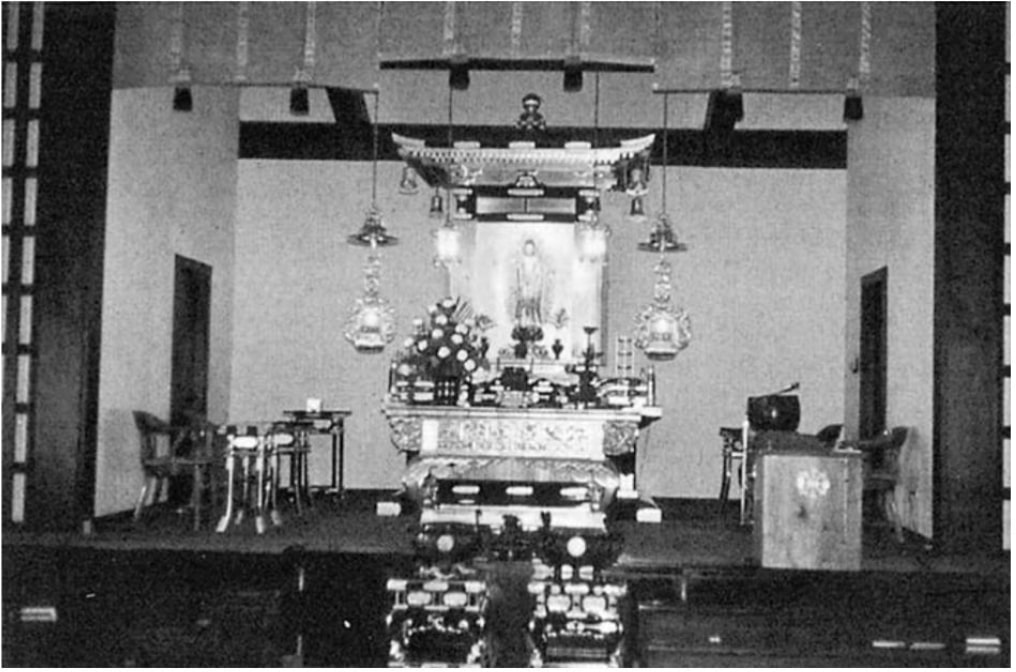
The Amida and altar of the Midwest Buddhist Temple in Chicago, Illinois.

=== Japanese and Korean immigration ===
The Chinese Exclusion Act of 1882 curtailed growth of the Chinese American population, but large-scale immigration from Japan began in the late 1880s and from Korea around 1903. In both cases, immigration was at first primarily to Hawai‘i. Populations from other Asian Buddhist countries followed, and in each case, the new communities established Buddhist temples and organizations. For instance, the first sanctioned Japanese temple in Hawai‘i, the Hāmākua Bukkyo Kaido (later renamed as the Hāmākua Jodo Mission), was built in 1896 by the Jōdo-shū school under the guidance of Reverend Gakuo Okabe. In 1898, Japanese missionaries and immigrants established a Young Men's Buddhist Association, and the Rev. Sōryū Kagahi was dispatched from Japan to be the first Buddhist missionary to Hawai‘i. The first Japanese Buddhist temple in the continental U.S. was built in San Francisco in 1899, and the first in Canada was built at the Ishikawa Hotel in Vancouver in 1905. The first Buddhist clergy to take up residence in the continental U.S. were Shuye Sonoda and Kakuryo Nishimjima, missionaries from Japan who arrived in 1899.

=== Contemporary Immigrant Buddhism ===
==== Japanese Buddhism ====
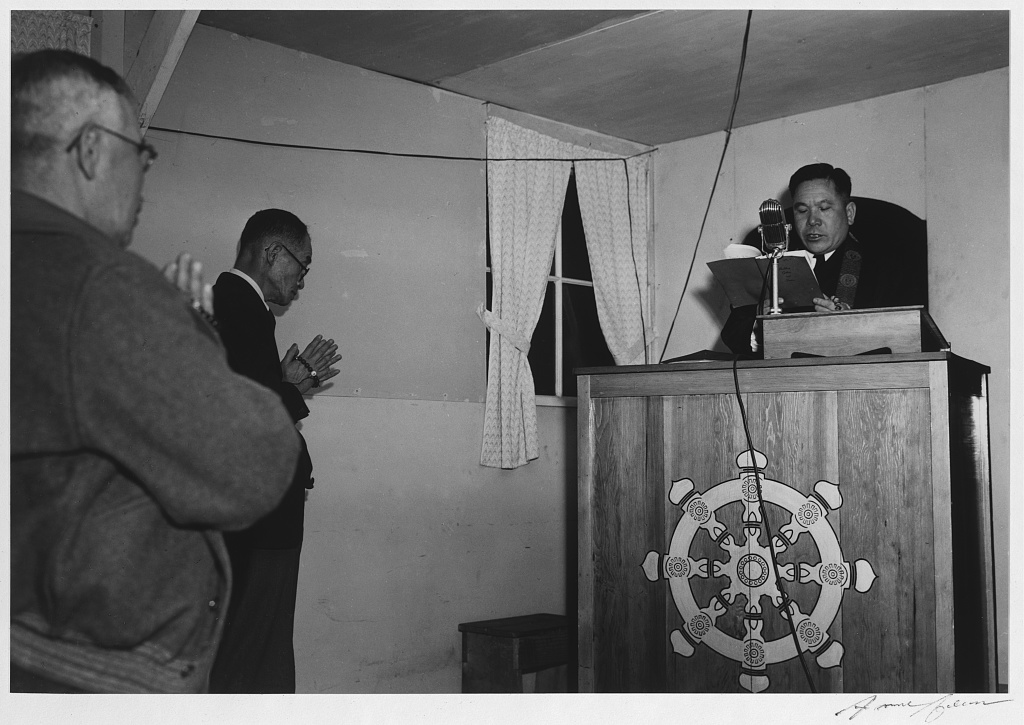
Buddhist service at the Manzanar War Relocation Center in 1943

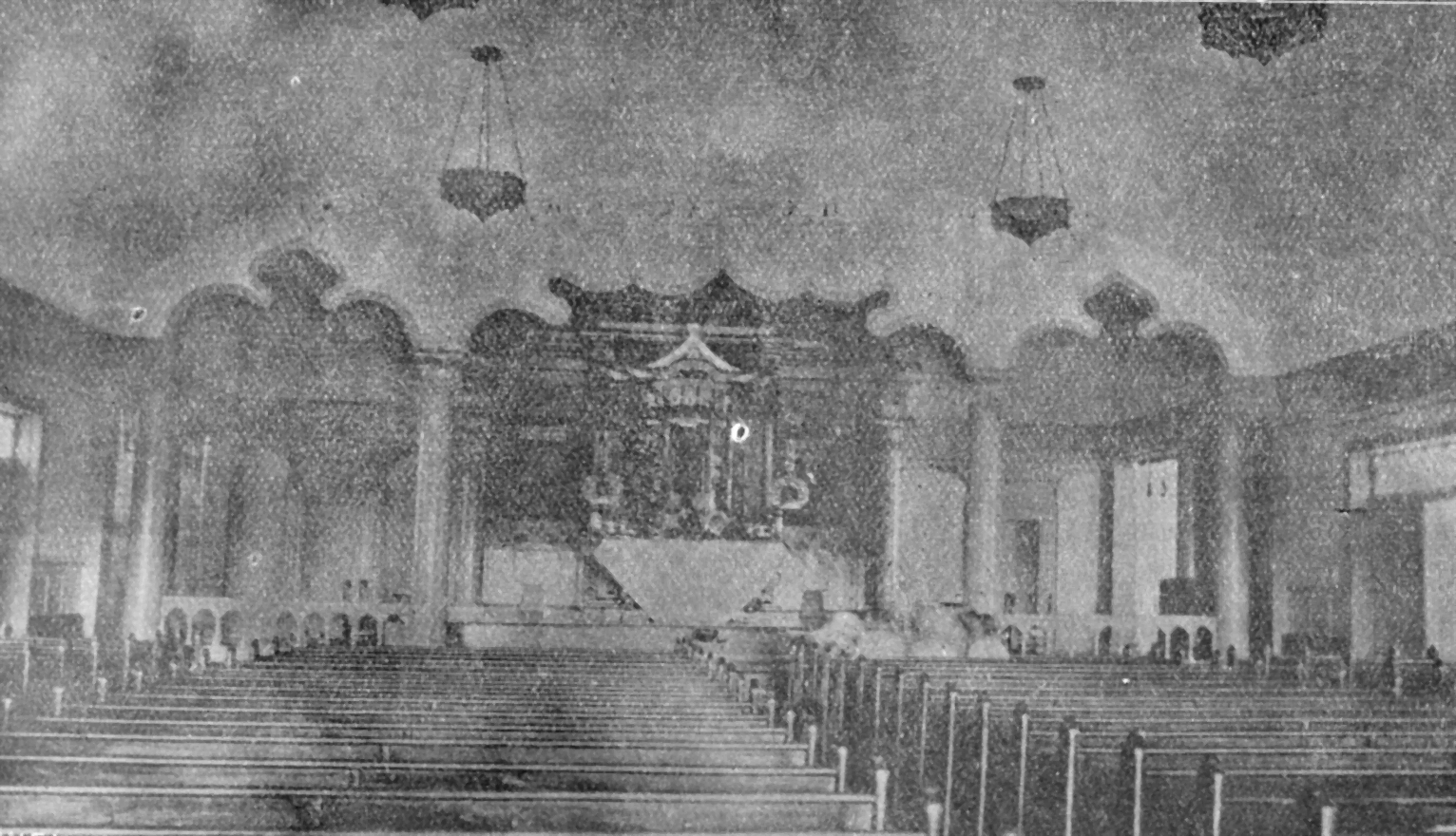
Interior of the Higashi Honganji, Los Angeles (East 1st St./Center Ave.), November 1925

===== Buddhist Churches of America =====
The Buddhist Churches of America and the Honpa Hongwanji Mission of Hawaii are immigrant Buddhist organizations in the United States. The BCA is an affiliate of Japan's Nishi Hongwanji, a sect of Jōdo Shinshū, which is, in turn, a form of Pure Land Buddhism. Tracing its roots to the Young Men's Buddhist Association founded in San Francisco at the end of the 19th century and the Buddhist Mission of North America founded in 1899, it took its current form in 1944. All of the Buddhist Mission's leadership, along with almost the entire Japanese American population, had been interned during World War II. The name Buddhist Churches of America was adopted at Topaz War Relocation Center in Utah; the word "church" was used in analogy to a Christian house of worship. After internment ended, some members returned to the West Coast and revitalized churches there, while a number of others moved to the Midwest and built new churches. During the 1960s and 1970s, the BCA was in a growth phase and was very successful at fund-raising. It also published two periodicals, one in Japanese and one in English. However, since 1980, BCA membership declined. The 36 temples in the state of Hawaii of the Honpa Hongwanji Mission have a similar history.

While a majority of the Buddhist Churches of America's membership are ethnically Japanese, some members have non-Asian backgrounds. Thus, it has limited aspects of export Buddhism. As involvement by its ethnic community declined, internal discussions advocated attracting the broader public.

===== Nichiren buddhism =====
Soka Gakkai, which means "Value Creation Society", is one of three sects of Nichiren Buddhism. It is considered a new religious movement from Japan that expanded after World War II. Soka Gakkai came to the United States with Daisaku Ikeda in the mid-20th century. Because of a rift with Nichiren Shōshū in 1991, the SGI has no priests of its own. Its main religious practice is chanting the mantra Nam Myōhō Renge Kyō and sections of the Lotus Sutra. Unlike schools such as Zen, Vipassanā, and Tibetan Buddhism, Soka Gakkai Buddhists do not practice meditative techniques other than chanting.

==== Taiwanese Buddhism ====
Another US Buddhist institution is Hsi Lai Temple in Hacienda Heights, California. Hsi Lai is the American headquarters of Fo Guang Shan, a modern Buddhist group in Taiwan. Hsi Lai was built in 1988 at a cost of $10 million and is often described as the largest Buddhist temple in the Western hemisphere. Although it caters primarily to Chinese Americans, it also has regular services and outreach programs in English.

== Growth of Buddhist philosophy in America ==
While Asian immigrants were arriving, some American intellectuals examined Buddhism, based primarily on information from British colonies in India and East Asia.

In the last century, numbers of Asian Buddhist masters and teachers have immigrated to the U.S. in order to propagate their beliefs and practices. Most have belonged to three major Buddhist traditions or cultures: Zen, Tibetan, and Theravadan.

=== Early translations ===
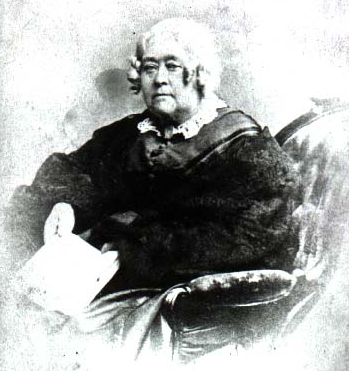
Elizabeth Palmer Peabody

The Englishmen William Jones and Charles Wilkins translated Sanskrit texts into English. The American Transcendentalists Henry David Thoreau, Ralph Waldo Emerson and Walt Whitman, took an interest in Hindu and Buddhist philosophy. They were among the first western writers to have access to translated Hindu and Buddhist texts. In 1844, The Dial, a small literary publication edited by Thoreau and Emerson, published an English version of a portion of the Lotus Sutra; it had been translated by Dial business manager Elizabeth Palmer Peabody from a French version recently completed by Eugène Burnouf. His Indian readings may have influenced his later experiments in simple living: at one point in Walden Thoreau wrote: "I realized what the Orientals meant by contemplation and the forsaking of works." Poet Walt Whitman also references Indian religions in his writing. In Whitman's well-known poem "Passage to India", he refers to Indian rivers, history and theology.

=== Theosophical Society ===
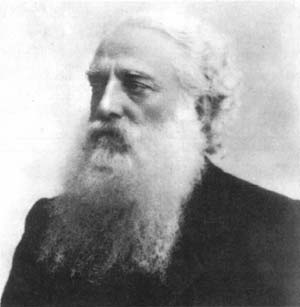
Henry Steel Olcott, cofounder of the Theosophical Society, was probably the first American convert to Buddhism.

An early American to publicly convert to Buddhism was Henry Steel Olcott. Olcott, a former U.S. army colonel during the Civil War, had grown interested in reports of supernatural phenomena that were popular in the late 19th century. In 1875, he, Helena Blavatsky, and William Quan Judge founded the Theosophical Society, dedicated to the study of the occult and influenced by Hindu and Buddhist scriptures. The leaders claimed to believe that they were in contact, via visions and messages, with a secret order of adepts called the "Himalayan Brotherhood" or "the Masters". In 1879, Olcott and Blavatsky traveled to India and in 1880, to Sri Lanka, where they were met enthusiastically by local Buddhists, who saw them as allies against an aggressive Christian missionary movement. On May 25, Olcott and Blavatsky took the pancasila vows of a lay Buddhist before a monk and a large crowd. Although most of the Theosophists appear to have counted themselves as Buddhists, they held idiosyncratic beliefs that separated them from known Buddhist traditions; only Olcott was enthusiastic about following mainstream Buddhism. He returned twice to Sri Lanka, where he promoted Buddhist education, and visited Japan and Burma. Olcott authored a Buddhist Catechism, stating his view of the basic tenets of the religion.

Several publications increased knowledge of Buddhism in 19th-century America. In 1879, Edwin Arnold, an English aristocrat, published The Light of Asia, an epic poem he had written about the life and teachings of the Buddha, expounded with much wealth of local color and not a little felicity of versification. The book became immensely popular in the United States, going through eighty editions and selling more than 500,000 copies.

=== Paul Carus ===
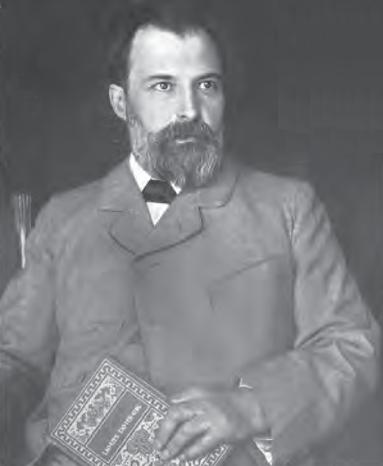
Paul Carus was an editor and collaborator with D. T. Suzuki.

Paul Carus, a German American philosopher and theologian, was at work on a more scholarly prose treatment of the same subject. Carus was the director of Open Court Publishing Company, an academic publisher specializing in philosophy, science, and religion, and editor of The Monist, a journal with a similar focus, both based in La Salle, Illinois. In 1894, Carus published The Gospel of Buddha, compiled from a variety of Asian texts which, true to its name, presented the Buddha's story in a form resembling the Christian Gospels. Carus was acclaimed among Asian clerics for his understanding of Buddhism. In a letter to S. Sonoda in San Francisco, Carus wrote "breathe the true spirit of Buddhism and yet be adapted to Western ways of thought".

=== Early spread ===
In 1887, The Buddhist Ray appeared, a Santa Cruz, California-based magazine published and edited by Phillangi Dasa, born Herman Carl (or Carl Herman) Veetering (or Vettering), a recluse about whom little is known. The Ray's tone was "ironic, light, saucy, self-assured ... one-hundred-percent American Buddhist". It ceased publication in 1894.

In 1893, the Parliament of the World's Religions hosted a number of Buddhist delegates, including the Zen master Soyen Shaku and the Sri Lankan Buddhist revivalist Anagarika Dharmapala. Shaku contrasted the idea of karma as a principle of causality with the "Prime Mover" nature of the Christian God, while Dharmapala challenged the idea of Christianity as a "universal religion" by comparing it to the more ancient and "universal" teachings of the Buddha.

In 1900 six white San Franciscans, working with Japanese Jodo Shinshu missionaries, established the Dharma Sangha of Buddha and published a bimonthly magazine, The Light of Dharma. In Illinois, Paul Carus wrote more books about Buddhism and set portions of Buddhist scripture to Western classical music.

By 1970, most all sects of Asian Buddhism were present in America. Don Morreale's 1988 catalogue of Buddhist America: Centers, Retreats, Practices had 350 pages of listings.

=== Dwight Goddard ===
One American who attempted to establish an American Buddhist movement was Dwight Goddard (1861–1939). Goddard was a Christian missionary to China when he first came in contact with Buddhism. In 1928, he spent a year living at a Zen monastery in Japan. In 1934, he founded "The Followers of Buddha, an American Brotherhood", with the goal of applying the traditional monastic structure of Buddhism more strictly than Senzaki and Sokei-an. The group was largely unsuccessful: no Americans were recruited to join as monks and attempts failed to attract a Chinese Chan (Zen) master to come to the United States. However, Goddard's efforts as an author and publisher bore considerable fruit. In 1930, he began publishing ZEN: A Buddhist Magazine. In 1932, he collaborated with D. T. Suzuki on a translation of the Lankavatara Sutra. That same year, he published the first edition of A Buddhist Bible, an anthology of Buddhist scriptures focusing on those used in Chinese and Japanese Zen.

== Zen ==
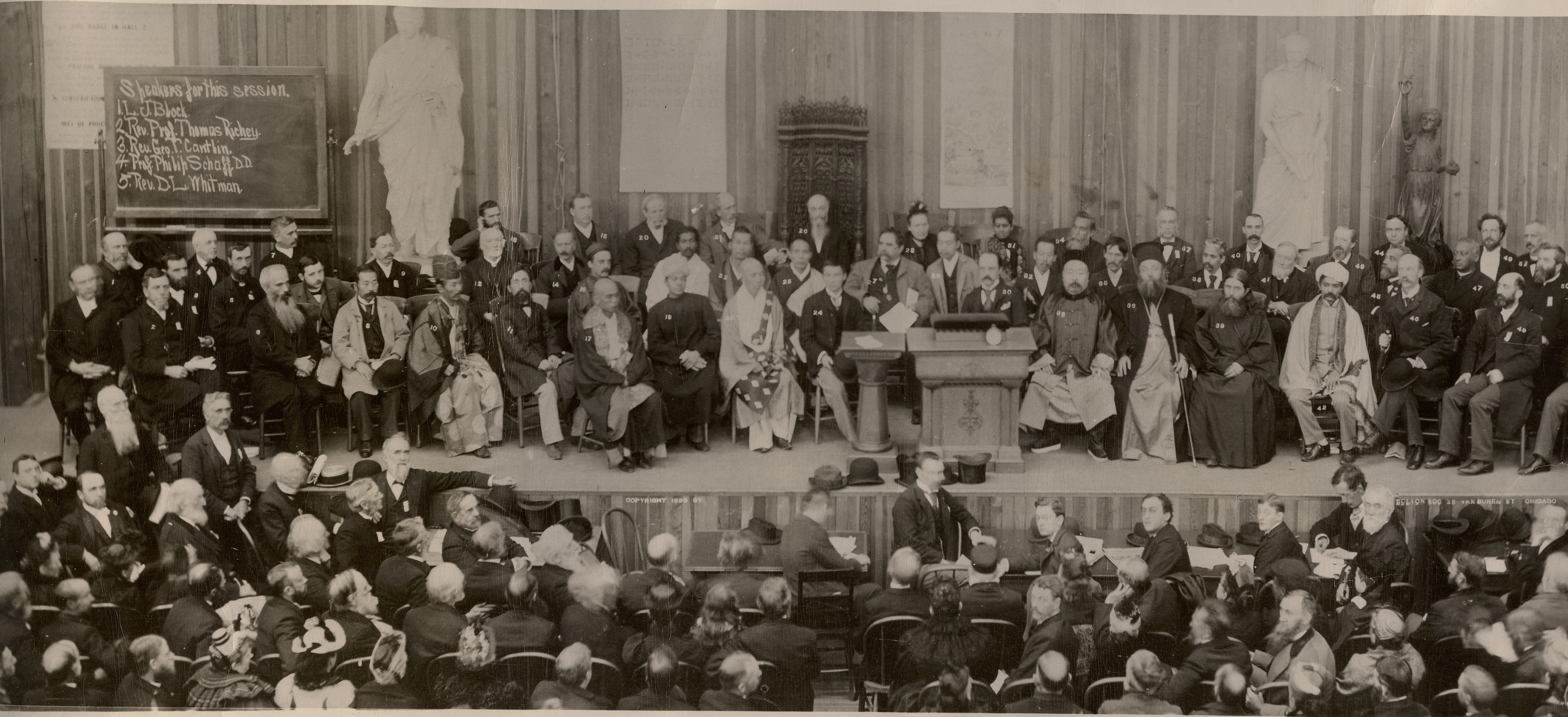
The 1893 World Parliament of Religions held in Chicago

=== Japanese Rinzai ===
Zen was introduced to the United States by Japanese priests who were sent to serve local immigrant groups. A small group also came to study the American culture and way of life.

==== Early Rinzai-teachers ====
In 1893, Soyen Shaku was invited to speak at the Parliament of the World's Religions held in Chicago. During his talks, he challenged his mostly Christian audience's notions of religion and presented Zen Buddhism as rational, nontheistic, and compatible with modern science. In 1905, Shaku was invited to stay in the United States by a wealthy American couple. He lived for nine months near San Francisco, where he established a small zendo in the home of Alexander and Ida Russell and gave regular zazen lessons, making him the first Zen Buddhist priest to teach in North America.

Shaku was followed by Nyogen Senzaki, a young monk from Shaku's home temple in Japan. Senzaki briefly worked for the Russells and then as a hotel porter, manager and eventually, owner. In 1922 Senzaki rented a hall and gave an English talk on a paper by Shaku; his periodic talks at different locations became known as the "floating zendo". Senzaki established an itinerant sitting hall from San Francisco to Los Angeles in California, where he taught until his death in 1958.

Sokatsu Shaku, one of Shaku's senior students, arrived in late 1906, founding a Zen meditation center called Ryomokyo-kai. One of his disciples, Shigetsu Sasaki, better known under his monastic name Sokei-an, came to New York to teach. In 1931, his small group incorporated as the Buddhist Society of America, later renamed the First Zen Institute of America. By the late 1930s, one of his most active supporters was Ruth Fuller Everett, an American socialite and the mother-in-law of Alan Watts. Shortly before Sokei-an's death in 1945, he and Everett would wed, at which point she took the name Ruth Fuller Sasaki.

==== D.T. Suzuki ====
D.T. Suzuki had a great literary impact. Through English language essays and books, such as Essays in Zen Buddhism (1927), he became a visible expositor of Zen Buddhism and its unofficial ambassador to Western readers. In 1951, Daisetz Teitaro Suzuki returned to the United States to take a visiting professorship at Columbia University, where his open lectures attracted members of the literary, artistic, and cultural elite.

==== Beat Zen ====
In the mid-1950s, writers associated with the Beat Generation took a serious interest in Zen, including Gary Snyder, Jack Kerouac, Allen Ginsberg, and Kenneth Rexroth, which increased its visibility. Prior to that, Philip Whalen had interest as early as 1946, and D. T. Suzuki began lecturing on Buddhism at Columbia in 1950. By 1958, anticipating Kerouac's publication of The Dharma Bums by three months, Time magazine said, "Zen Buddhism is growing more chic by the minute."

==== Contemporary Rinzai ====
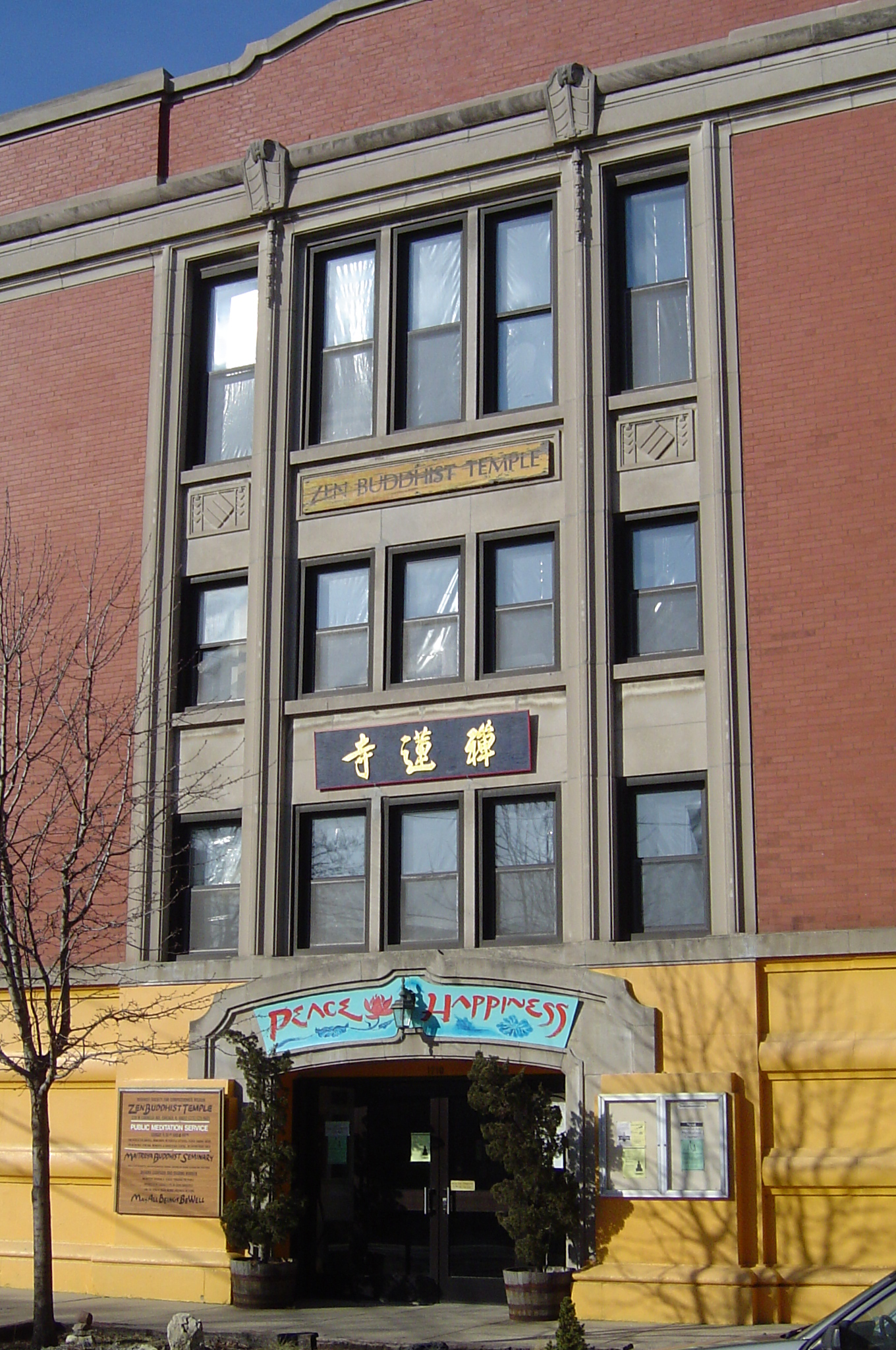
The Zen Buddhist Temple in Chicago, part of the Buddhist Society for Compassionate Wisdom

Contemporary Rinzai Zen teachers in United States have included Kyozan Joshu Sasaki Roshi, Eido Tai Shimano Roshi, and Omori Sogen Roshi (d. 1994). Sasaki founded the Mount Baldy Zen Center and its branches after coming to Los Angeles from Japan in 1962. One of his students is the Canadian poet and musician Leonard Cohen. Eido Roshi founded Dai Bosatsu Zendo Kongo-ji, a training center in New York state. Omori Roshi founded Daihonzan Chozen-ji, the first Rinzai headquarters temple established outside Japan, in Honolulu; under his students Tenshin Tanouye Roshi and Dogen Hosokawa Roshi and their dharma heirs, several other training centers were established including Daiyuzenji in Chicago and Korinji in Wisconsin.

In 1998 Sherry Chayat, born in Brooklyn, became the first American woman to receive transmission in the Rinzai school of Buddhism.

=== Japanese Sōtō ===
==== Soyu Matsuoka ====
In the 1930s Soyu Matsuoka-roshi was sent to America by Sōtōshū, to establish the Sōtō Zen tradition in the United States. He established the Chicago Buddhist Temple in 1949. Matsuoka-roshi also served as superintendent and abbot of the Long Beach Zen Buddhist Temple and Zen Center. He relocated from Chicago to establish a temple at Long Beach in 1971 after leaving the Zen Buddhist Temple of Chicago to his dharma heir Kongo Richard Langlois, Roshi. He returned to Chicago in 1995, where he died in 1998.

==== Shunryu Suzuki ====
Sōtō Zen priest Shunryu Suzuki (no relation to D.T. Suzuki), who was the son of a Sōtō priest, was sent to San Francisco in the late 1950s on a three-year temporary assignment to care for an established Japanese congregation at the Sōtō temple, Soko-ji. Suzuki also taught zazen or sitting meditation which soon attracted American students and "beatniks", who formed a core of students who in 1962 would create the San Francisco Zen Center and its eventual network of highly influential Zen centers across the country, including the Tassajara Zen Mountain Center, the first Buddhist monastery in the Western world. He provided innovation and creativity during San Francisco's countercultural movement of the 1960s but he died in 1971. His low-key teaching style was described in the popular book Zen Mind, Beginner's Mind, a compilation of his talks.

==== Tozen Akiyama ====
Ordained in 1974 in Japan by Tosui Ohta, came to the United States in 1983, initially posted to Zenshuji in Los Angeles. In 1985 he became the abbot of Milwaukee Zen Center, which he led and developed until 2000. He has three dharma heirs: Jisho Warner in California, abiding teacher of Stone Creek Zen Center; Tonen Sara O'Connor in Wisconsin, former head priest of Milwaukee Zen Center; and Toshu Neatrour in Idaho.

==== White Plum Sangha ====
Taizan Maezumi arrived as a young priest to serve at Zenshuji, the North American Sōtō sect headquarters in Los Angeles, in 1956. Maezumi received dharma transmission (shiho) from Baian Hakujun Kuroda, his father and high-ranked Sōtō priest, in 1955. By the mid-1960s he had formed a regular zazen group. In 1967, he and his supporters founded the Zen Center of Los Angeles. Further, he received teaching permission (inka) from Koryu Osaka – a Rinzai teacher – and from Yasutani Hakuun of the Sanbo Kyodan. Maezumi, in turn, had several American dharma heirs, such as Bernie Glassman, John Daido Loori, Charlotte Joko Beck, William Nyogen Yeo, and Dennis Genpo Merzel. His successors and their network of centers became the White Plum Sangha. In 2006 Merle Kodo Boyd, born in Texas, became the first African-American woman ever to receive Dharma transmission in Zen Buddhism.

=== Sanbo Kyodan ===
Sanbo Kyodan is a contemporary Japanese Zen lineage which had an impact in the West disproportionate to its size in Japan. It is rooted in the reformist teachings of Harada Daiun Sogaku (1871–1961) and his disciple Yasutani Hakuun (1885–1971), who argued that the existing Zen institutions of Japan (Sōtō and Rinzai sects) had become complacent and were generally unable to convey real Dharma.

==== Philip Kapleau ====
Sanbo Kyodan's first American member was Philip Kapleau, who first traveled to Japan in 1945 as a court reporter for the war crimes trials. In 1953, he returned to Japan, where he met with Nakagawa Soen, a protégé of Nyogen Senzaki. In 1965, he published a book, The Three Pillars of Zen, which recorded a set of talks by Yasutani outlining his approach to practice, along with transcripts of dokusan interviews and some additional texts. In 1965 Kapleau returned to America and, in 1966, established the Rochester Zen Center in Rochester, New York. In 1967, Kapleau had a falling-out with Yasutani over Kapleau's moves to Americanize his temple, after which it became independent of Sanbo Kyodan. One of Kapleau's early disciples was Toni Packer, who left Rochester in 1981 to found a nonsectarian meditation center, not specifically Buddhist or Zen.

==== Robert Aitken ====
Robert Aitken was introduced to Zen as a prisoner in Japan during World War II. After returning to the United States, he studied with Nyogen Senzaki in Los Angeles in the early 1950s. In 1959, while still a Zen student, he founded the Diamond Sangha, a zendo in Honolulu, Hawaii. Aitken became a dharma heir of Yamada's, authored more than ten books, and developed the Diamond Sangha into an international network with temples in the United States, Argentina, Germany, and Australia. In 1995, he and his organization split with Sanbo Kyodan in response to reorganization of the latter following Yamada's death. The Pacific Zen Institute led by John Tarrant, Aitken's first Dharma successor, continues as an independent Zen line.

=== Chinese Chan ===
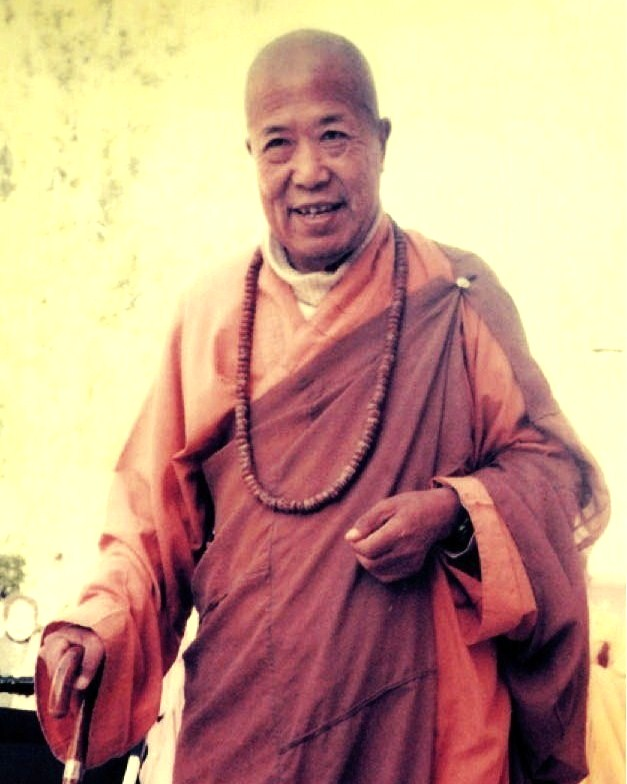
Hsuan Hua in Ukiah, California

There are also Zen teachers of Chinese Chan, Korean Seon, and Vietnamese Thien.

==== Hsuan Hua ====
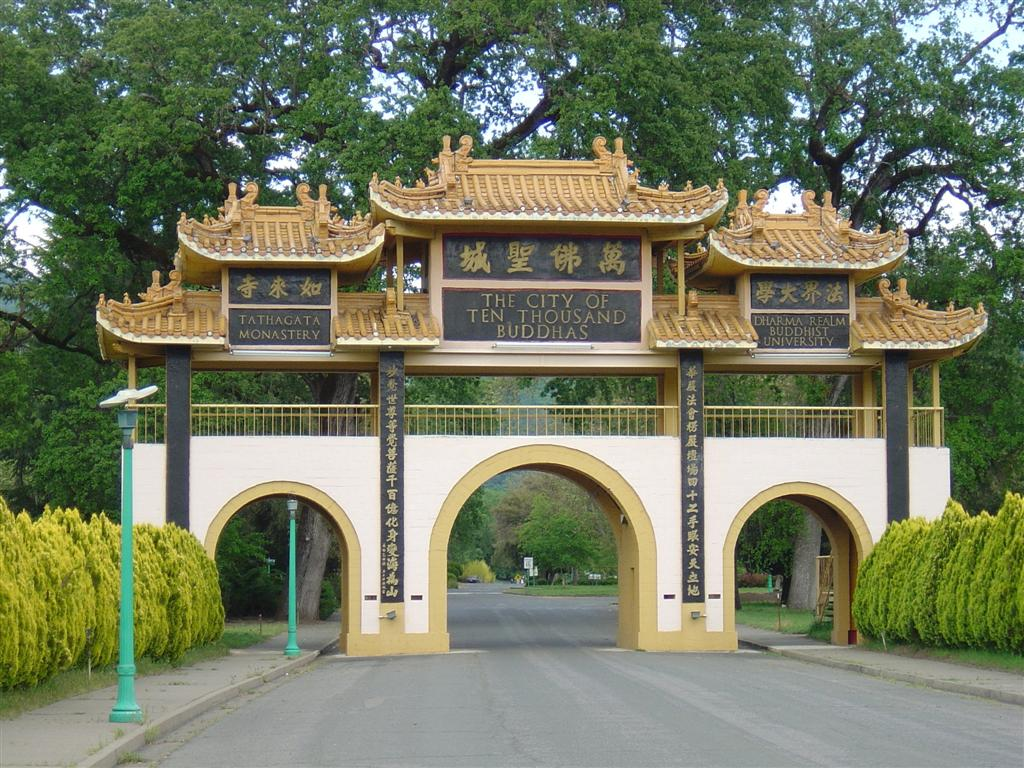
The 480-acre (1.9 km^{2}) City of Ten Thousand Buddhas founded by Hsuan Hua in Talmage, California, is geographically the largest Buddhist community in the western hemisphere.

In 1962, Hsuan Hua moved to San Francisco's Chinatown, where, in addition to Zen, he taught Chinese Pure Land, Tiantai, Vinaya, and Vajrayana Buddhism. Initially, his students were mostly westerners, but he eventually attracted a range of followers.

==== Sheng-yen ====
Sheng-yen first visited the United States in 1978 under the sponsorship of the Buddhist Association of the United States, an organization of Chinese American Buddhists. In 1980, he founded the Chán Meditation Society in Queens, New York. In 1985, he founded the Chung-hwa Institute of Buddhist Studies in Taiwan, which sponsors Chinese Zen activities in the United States.

=== Korean Seon ===
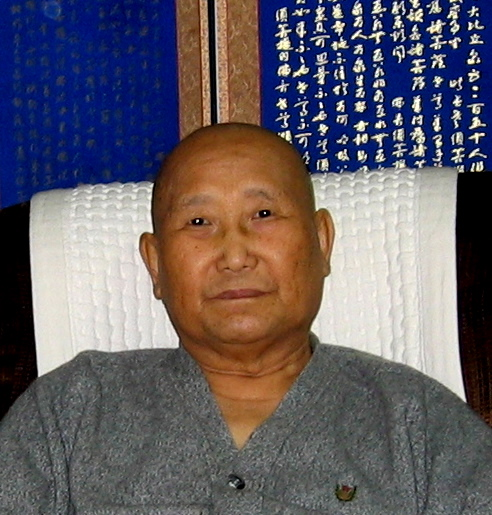
Seung Sahn in 2002

Seung Sahn was a temple abbot in Seoul. After living in Hong Kong and Japan, he moved to the US in 1972 (not speaking any English) to establish the Kwan Um School of Zen. Shortly after arriving in Providence, he attracted students and founded the Providence Zen Center. The Kwan Um School has more than 100 Zen centers on six continents.

Another Korean Zen teacher, Samu Sunim, founded Toronto's Zen Buddhist Temple in 1971. He was head of the Buddhist Society for Compassionate Wisdom, which has temples in Ann Arbor, Chicago, Toronto, Mexico City, and New York City, along with a retreat center in Upstate New York.

Hye Am (1884–1985) brought lineage Dharma to the United States. Hye Am's Dharma successor, Myo Vong founded the Western Son Academy (1976), and his Korean disciple, Pohwa Sunim, founded World Zen Fellowship (1994) which includes various Zen centers in the United States, such as the Potomac Zen Sangha, the Patriarchal Zen Society and the Baltimore Zen Center.

Recently, Korean Buddhist monks have come to the United States to spread the Dharma. They are establishing temples and zen (Korean, 'Seon') centers all around the United States. For example, Hyeonho established the Goryosah Temple in Los Angeles in 1979, and Muil Woohak founded the Budzen Center in New York.

=== Vietnamese Thien ===
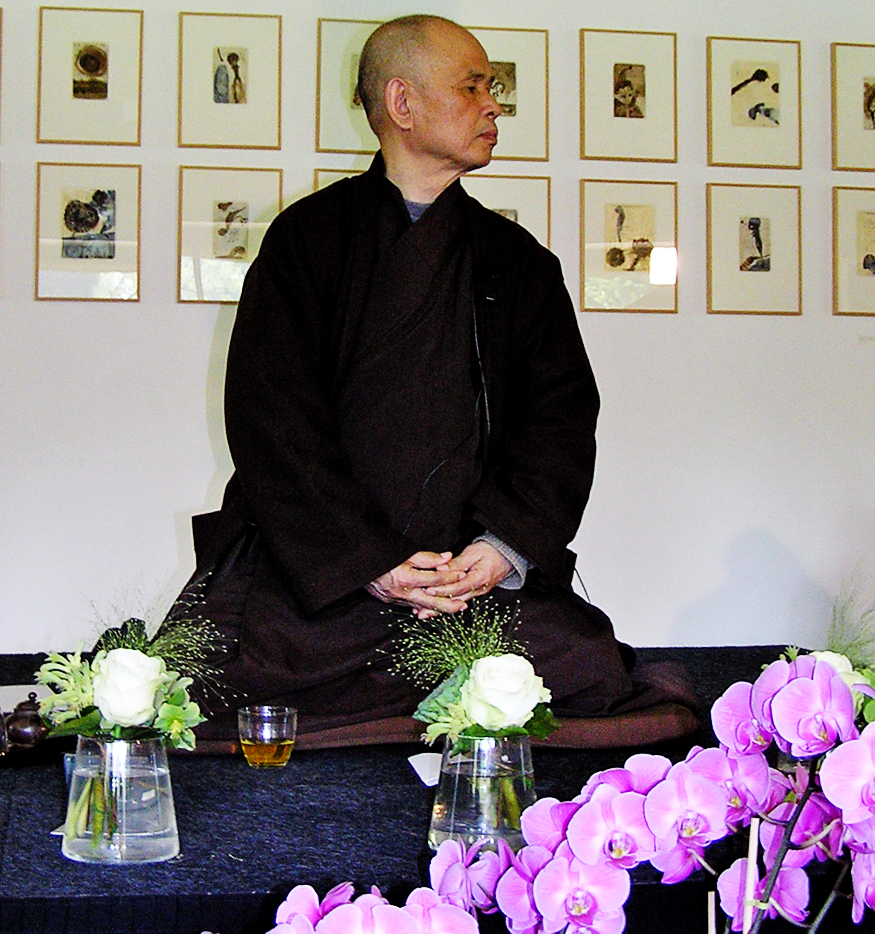
Thích Nhất Hạnh in 2006

Vietnamese Zen (Thiền) teachers in America include Thích Thiên-Ân and Thích Nhất Hạnh. Thích Thiên-Ân came to America in 1966 as a visiting professor at UCLA and taught traditional Thiền meditation.

==== Thích Nhất Hạnh ====
Thích Nhất Hạnh was a monk in Vietnam during the Vietnam War. In 1966, he left Vietnam in exile and founded the Plum Village Monastery in France. In his books and talks, Thích Nhất Hạnh emphasizes mindfulness (sati) as the most important practice in daily life. His monastic students live and practice at three centers in the United States: Deer Park Monastery in Escondido, California, Blue Cliff Monastery in Pine Bush, New York, and Magnolia Grove Monastery in Batesville, Mississippi.

== Tibetan Buddhism ==
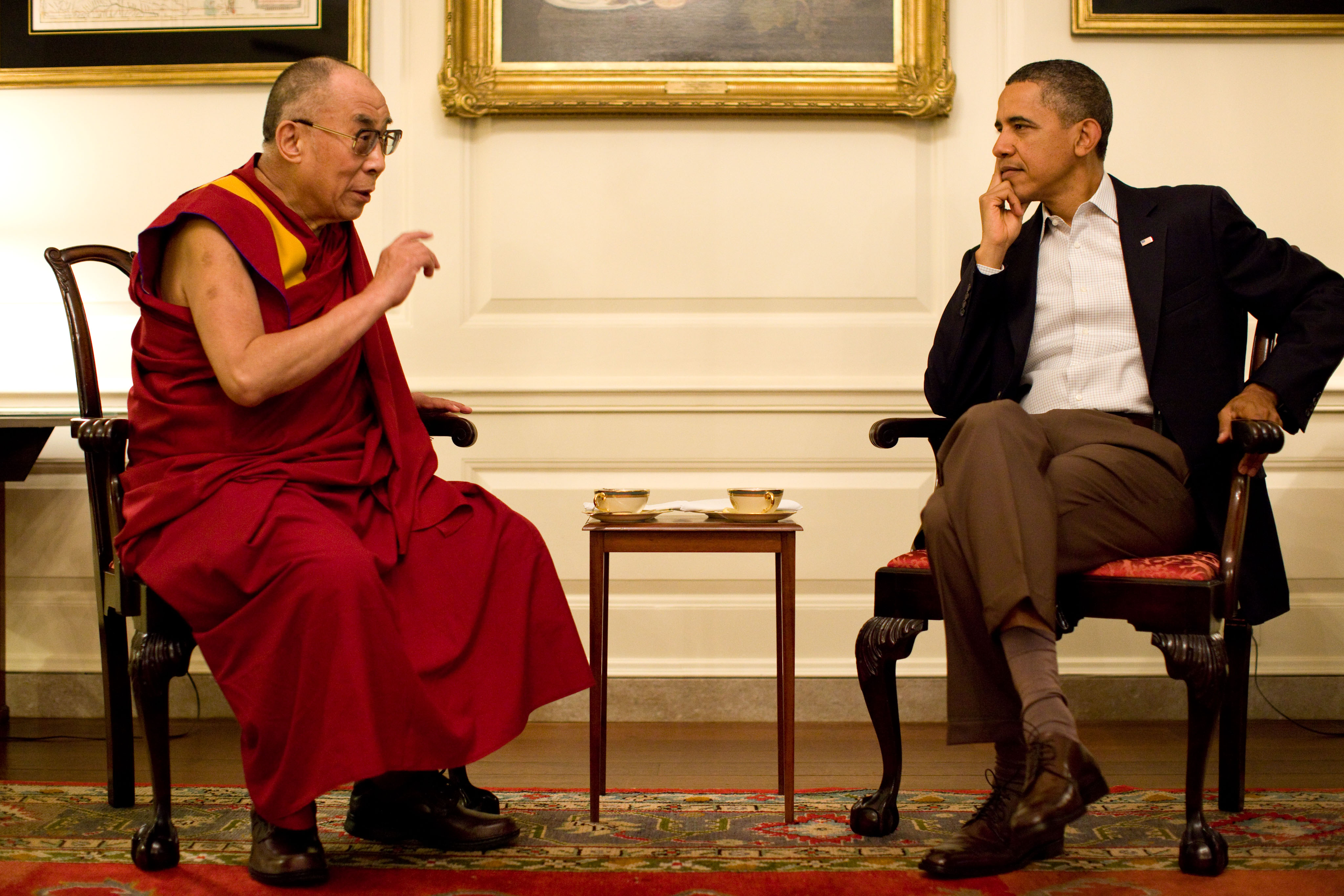
The Dalai Lama with US President Barack Obama at the White House

Perhaps the most widely visible Buddhist leader in the world is Tenzin Gyatso, the current Dalai Lama, who first visited the United States in 1979. As the exiled political leader of Tibet, he has become a popular cause célèbre, attracting celebrity religious followers such as Richard Gere and Adam Yauch. His early life was depicted in Hollywood films such as Kundun and Seven Years in Tibet. An early Western-born Tibetan Buddhist monk was Robert A. F. Thurman, now an academic supporter of the Dalai Lama. The Dalai Lama maintains a North American headquarters in Ithaca, New York.

The Dalai Lama's family has strong ties to America. His brother Thubten Norbu fled China after being asked to assassinate his brother. He was himself a Lama, the Takster Rinpoche, and an abbot of the Kumbum Monastery in Tibet's Amdo region. He settled in Bloomington, Indiana, where he later founded the Tibetan Mongolian Buddhist Cultural Center and Kumbum Chamtse Ling Temple. Since the death of the Takster Rinpoche it has served as a Kumbum of the West, with the current Arija Rinpochere serving as its leader.

Dilowa Gegen (Diluu Khudagt) was the first lama to immigrate to the United States in 1949 as a political refugee and joined Owen Lattimore's Mongolia Project. He was born in Tudevtei, Zavkhan, Mongolia and was one of the leading figures in declaration of independence of Mongolia. He was exiled from Mongolia, the reason remains unrevealed to this day. After arriving in the US, he joined Johns Hopkins University and founded a monastery in New Jersey.

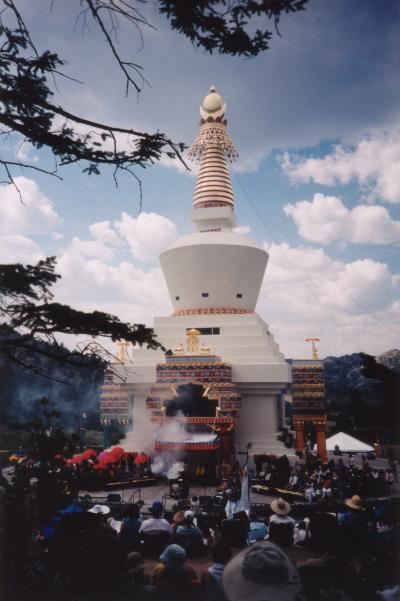
The ashes of Chögyam Trungpa are in the Great Stupa of Dharmakaya.

The first Tibetan Buddhist lama to have American students was Geshe Ngawang Wangyal, a Kalmyk-Mongolian of the Gelug lineage, who came to the United States in 1955 and founded the "Lamaist Buddhist Monastery of America" in New Jersey in 1958. Among his students were the future western scholars Robert Thurman, Jeffrey Hopkins, Alexander Berzin and Anne C. Klein. Other early arrivals included Dezhung Rinpoche, a Sakya lama who settled in Seattle, in 1960, and Tarthang Tulku Rinpoche, the first Nyingma teacher in America, who arrived in the US in 1968 and established the "Tibetan Nyingma Meditation Center" in Berkeley, California, in 1969.

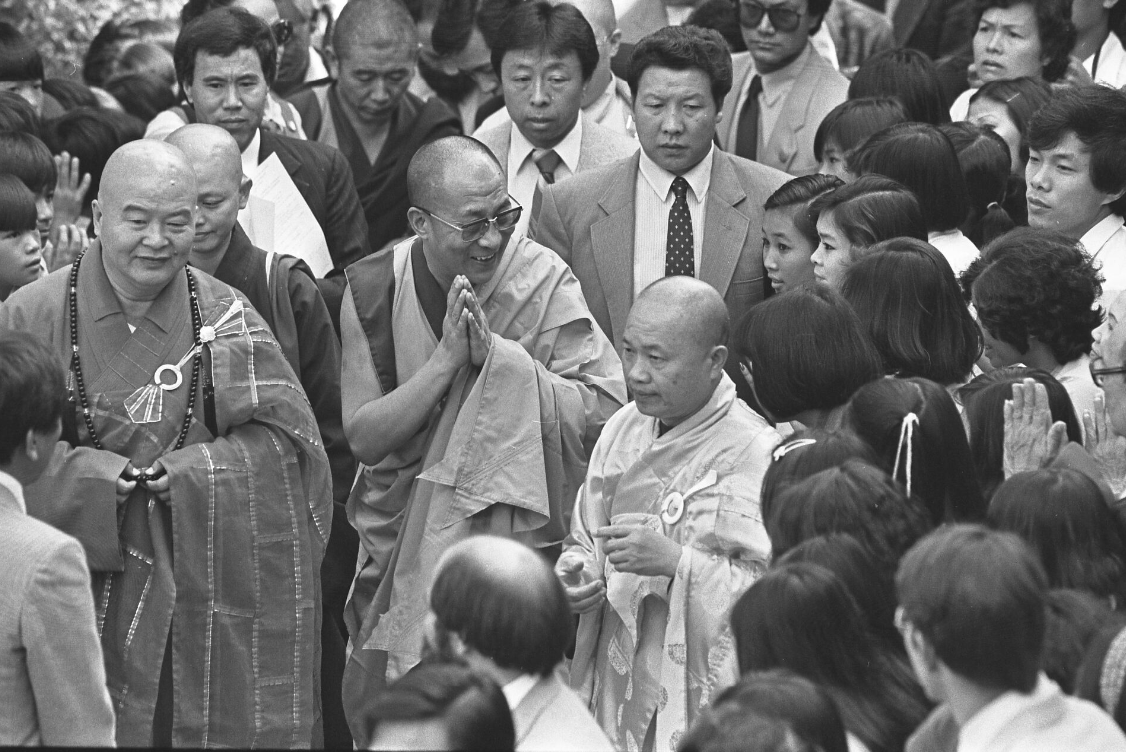
Dalai Lama, 1984 in Los Angeles during visit to Vietnamese Temple

A well known Tibetan Buddhist lama to live in the United States was Chögyam Trungpa. Trungpa, part of the Kagyu school of Tibetan Buddhism, moved to England in 1963, founded a temple in Scotland, and then relocated to Barnet, Vermont, and then Boulder, Colorado, by 1970. He established what he named Dharmadhatu meditation centers, eventually organized under a national umbrella group called Vajradhatu (renamed Shambhala International in February 2000). He developed a series of secular techniques he called Shambhala Training. Following Trungpa's death, his followers at the Rocky Mountain Shambhala Center built the Great Stupa of Dharmakaya, a traditional reliquary monument, near Red Feather Lakes, Colorado, consecrated in 2001.

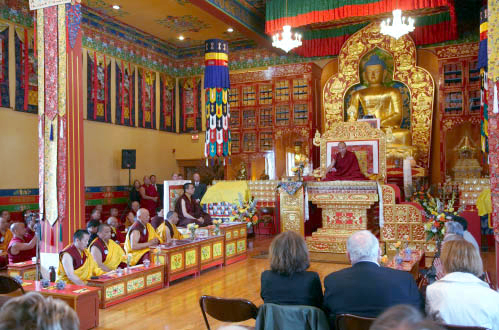
Karma Triyana Dharmachakra monastery in Woodstock, New York

There are four major schools of Tibetan Buddhism: the Gelug, the Kagyu, the Nyingma, and the Sakya. Of these, the greatest impact in the West was made by the Gelug, led by the Dalai Lama, and the Kagyu, specifically its Karma Kagyu branch, led by the Karmapa. In 1974 Trungpa Rinpoche and Kalu Rinpoche invited the 16th Karmapa to the United States. As of the early 1990s, there were several significant strands of Kagyu practice in the United States: Chögyam Trungpa's Shambhala movement; Karma Triyana Dharmachakra, a network of centers affiliated directly with the Karmapa's North American seat in Woodstock, New York; a network of centers founded by Kalu Rinpoche; a number of centers dedicated to mahamudra study and practice founded by Thrangu Rinpoche. The Drikung Kagyu lineage also has an established presence in the United States. Khenchen Konchog Gyaltsen arrived in the US in 1982 and planted the seeds for multiple Drikung centers across the country. He also paved the way for the arrival of Garchen Rinpoche, who established the Garchen Buddhist Institute in Chino Valley, Arizona. In 1990, Mahamudra Meditation Center was founded by Peter F. Barth, under the guidance of Thrangu Rinpoche and Khenchen Konchog Gyaltsen.

Diamond Way Buddhism founded by Lama Ole Nydahl and Hannah Nydahl, and under the spiritual guidance of Thaye Dorje, is also active in the US. The focus is on making Karma Kagyu teachings and methods available to modern and independent thinkers in the West. In 1972, the 16th Karmapa Rangjung Rigpe Dorje requested Lama Ole Nydhal and Hannah Nydhal to establish Buddhist centers of the Karma Kagyu lineage in the Western world. Lama Ole Nydahl offered Buddhist refuge to tens of thousands of people and founded 640 Buddhist centers around the world.

In the 21st century, the Nyingma lineage is increasingly represented in the West by both Western and Tibetan teachers. Lama Surya Das is a Western-born teacher carrying on the "great rimé", a non-sectarian form of Tibetan Buddhism. The late Chagdud Tulku Rinpoche founded centers in Seattle and Brazil. Gochen Tulku Sangak (sometimes spelled "Sang-Ngag") Rinpoche is the founder and spiritual director of the first Ewam International Center located in the US. He is also the spiritual director of the Namchak Foundation in Montana and a primary lineage holder of the Namchak lineage. Khandro Rinpoche is a female Tibetan teacher who has a presence in America. Jetsunma Ahkon Lhamo is the first Western woman to be enthroned as a Tulku, and established Nyingma Kunzang Palyul Choling centers in Sedona, Arizona, and Poolesville, Maryland.

The Gelug tradition is represented in America by the Foundation for the Preservation of the Mahayana Tradition (FPMT), founded by Lama Thubten Yeshe and Lama Zopa. Gelugpa teacher Geshe Michael Roach, the first American to be awarded a Geshe degree, established centers in New York and at Diamond Mountain University in Arizona.

Sravasti Abbey is the first Tibetan Buddhist monastery for Western monks and nuns in the U.S., established in Washington State by Bhikshuni Thubten Chodron in 2003. It is situated on 300 acres of forest and meadows, 11 miles (18 km) outside of Newport, Washington, near the Idaho state line. It is open to visitors who want to learn about community life in a Tibetan Buddhist monastic setting. The name Sravasti Abbey was chosen by the Dalai Lama. Bhikshuni Thubten Chodron had suggested the name, as Sravasti was the place in India where the Buddha spent 25 rains retreats (varsa in Sanskrit and yarne in Tibetan), and communities of both nuns and monks had resided there. This seemed auspicious to ensure the Buddha's teachings would be abundantly available to both male and female monastics at the monastery.

Sravasti Abbey is notable because it is home to a growing group of fully ordained bhikshunis (Buddhist nuns) practicing in the Tibetan tradition. This is special because the tradition of full ordination for women was not transmitted from India to Tibet. Ordained women practicing in the Tibetan tradition usually hold a novice ordination. Venerable Thubten Chodron, while faithfully following the teachings of her Tibetan teachers, has arranged for her students to seek full ordination as bhikshunis in Taiwan.

In January 2014, the Abbey, which then had seven bhikshunis and three novices, formally began its first winter varsa (three-month monastic retreat), which lasted until April 13, 2014. As far as the Abbey knows, this was the first time a Western bhikshuni sangha practicing in the Tibetan tradition had done this ritual in the United States and in English. On April 19, 2014, the Abbey held its first kathina ceremony to mark the end of the varsa. Also in 2014 the Abbey held its first Pavarana rite at the end of the varsa. In October 2015 the Annual Western Buddhist Monastic Gathering was held at the Abbey for the first time; it was the 21st such gathering.

In 2006, Geshe Thupten Dorjee, educated at Drepung Loseling Monastery, and poet Sidney Burris founded the Tibetan Cultural Institute of Arkansas, which began offering two weekly meditation courses and bringing monks and scholars to give lectures to the community at large. In 2008, the TEXT (Tibetans in Exile Today) Program at the University of Arkansas in Fayetteville began an oral history project to help archive the stories of Tibetans currently living in exile in India. In June 2011, a month after the Dalai Lama visited, TCIA received a donation to build a retreat center and stupa near Crosses, Arkansas.

In 2010 the first Tibetan Buddhist nunnery in North America was established in Vermont, called Vajra Dakini Nunnery, offering novice ordination. The abbot of this nunnery is an American woman named Khenmo Drolma who is the first "bhikkhunni", a fully ordained Buddhist nun, in the Drikung Kagyu tradition of Buddhism, having been ordained in Taiwan in 2002. She is also the first westerner, male or female, to be installed as a Buddhist abbot, having been installed as abbot of Vajra Dakini Nunnery in 2004.

== Theravada ==
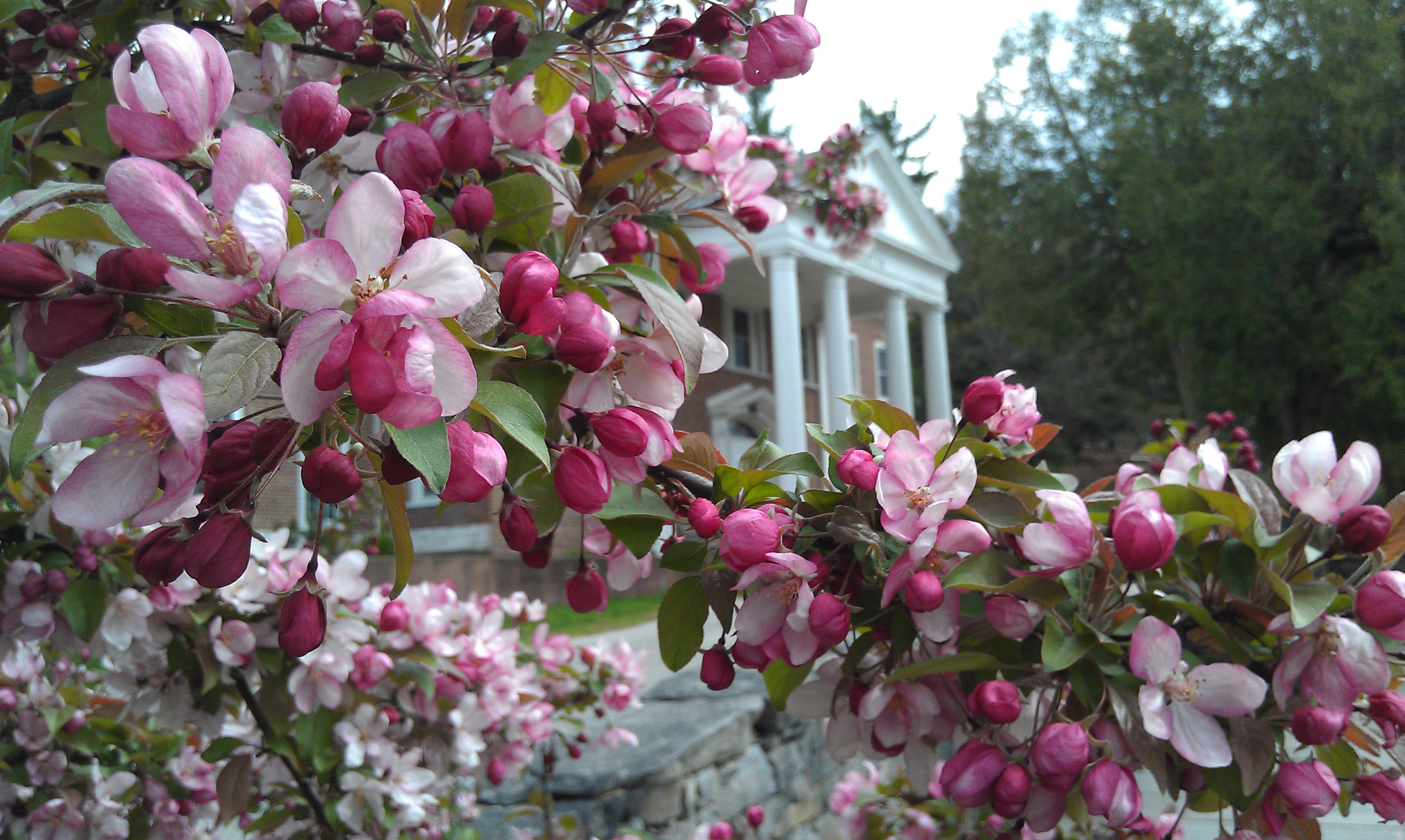
Insight Meditation Society in Barre, Massachusetts

Theravada is best known for Vipassana, roughly translated as "insight meditation", which is an ancient meditative practice described in the Pali Canon of the Theravada school of Buddhism and similar scriptures. Vipassana also refers to a distinct movement which was begun in the 20th century by reformers such as Mahāsi Sayādaw, a Burmese monk. Mahāsi Sayādaw was a Theravada bhikkhu and Vipassana is rooted in the Theravada teachings, but its goal is to simplify ritual and other peripheral activities in order to make meditative practice more effective and available both to monks and to laypeople.

=== American Theravada Buddhists ===
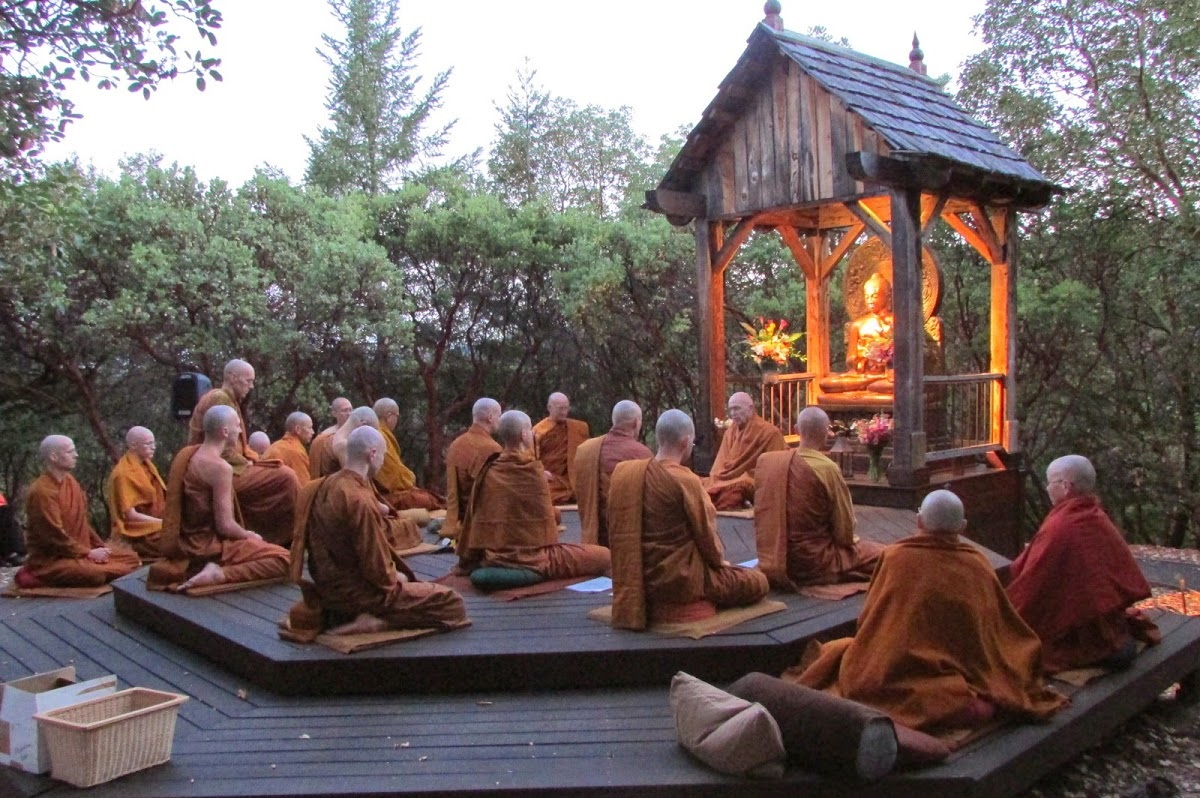
Abhayagiri Buddhist Monastery, Asalha Puja 2014

In 1966, monks from Sri Lanka established the Washington Buddhist Vihara in Washington, DC. The Vihara, along with the Buddhist Study Center in New York were the first Theravada Buddhist organizations in the United States. The Vihara was accessible to English-speakers with Vipassana meditation part of its activities. However, the direct influence of the Vipassana movement would not reach the U.S. until a group of Americans returned there in the early 1970s after studying with Vipassana masters in Asia.

Joseph Goldstein, after journeying to Southeast Asia with the Peace Corps, lived in Bodhgaya as a student of Anagarika Munindra, the head monk of Mahabodhi Temple and himself a student of Māhāsai Sayādaw. Jack Kornfield also worked for the Peace Corps in Southeast Asia, and then studied and ordained in the Thai Forest Tradition under Ajahn Chah, a major figure in 20th-century Thai Buddhism. Sharon Salzberg went to India in 1971 and studied with Dipa Ma, a former Calcutta housewife trained in vipassana by Māhāsai Sayādaw. The Thai Forest Tradition also has a number of branch monasteries in the United States, including Abhayagiri Buddhist Monastery (Ajahn Pasanno, Abbot), Metta Forest Monastery (with Thanissaro Bhikkhu as Abbot) and Jetavana Temple Forest Monastery.

Goldstein and Kornfield met in 1974 while teaching at the Naropa Institute in Colorado. The next year, Goldstein, Kornfield, and Salzberg, who had very recently returned from Calcutta, along with Jacqueline Schwarz, founded the Insight Meditation Society on an 80-acre (324,000 m^{2}) property near Barre, Massachusetts. IMS hosted visits by Māhāsi Sayādaw, Munindra, Ajahn Chah, and Dipa Ma. In 1981, Kornfield moved to California, where he founded another Vipassana center, Spirit Rock Meditation Center, in Marin County. In 1985, Larry Rosenberg founded the Cambridge Insight Meditation Center in Cambridge, Massachusetts. Another Vipassana center is the Vipassana Metta Foundation, located on Maui. "When a Retreat Center course is in progress, anyone who is not already participating in the retreat is welcome to attend the evening talks about the teachings, known as Dharma talks. Those with insight meditation experience are also welcome to attend group sittings." Dharma talks are available for free download, a service provided by Dharma Seed.

In 1989, the Insight Meditation Center established the Barre Center for Buddhist Studies near the IMS headquarters, to promote scholarly investigation of Buddhism. Its first director was Mu Soeng, a former Korean Zen monk.

In the early 1990s, Ajahn Amaro made several teaching trips to northern California. Many who attended his meditation retreats became enthusiastic about the possibility of establishing a permanent monastic community in the area. In the meantime, Amaravati Monastery in England received a substantial donation of land in Mendocino County from Chan Master Hsuan Hua. The land was allocated to establish a forest monastery. Abhayagiri Monastery was established and placed in the hands of a group of lay practitioners, the Sanghapala Foundation. Ajahn Pasanno moved to California on New Year's Eve of 1997 to share the abbotship of Abhayagiri Monastery, Redwood Valley, California, with Ajahn Amaro.

In 1997 Dhamma Cetiya Vihara in Boston was founded by Ven. Gotami of Thailand, then a 10 precept nun. Ven. Gotami received full ordination in 2000, at which time her dwelling became America's first Theravada Buddhist bhikkhuni vihara. "Vihara" translates as monastery or nunnery, and may be both dwelling and community center where one or more bhikkhus or bhikkhunis offer teachings on Buddhist scriptures, conduct traditional ceremonies, teach meditation, offer counseling and other community services, receive alms, and reside. More recently established Theravada bhikkhuni viharas include: Mahapajapati Monastery where several nuns (bhikkhunis and novices) live together in the desert of southern California near Joshua Tree, founded by Ven. Gunasari Bhikkhuni of Burma in 2008; Aranya Bodhi Hermitage founded by Ven. Tathaaloka Bhikkhuni in the forest near Jenner, CA, with Ven. Sobhana Bhikkhuni as Prioress, which opened officially in July 2010, where several bhikkhunis reside together along with trainees and lay supporters; and Sati Saraniya in Ontario, founded by Ven. Medhanandi in appx 2009, where two bhikkhunis reside. In 2009 Aloka Vihara Forest Monastery in the Sierra Foothills of California was created by Ayya Anandabodhi and Ayya Santacitta. (There are also quiet residences of individual bhikkhunis where they may receive visitors and give teachings, such as the residence of Ven. Amma Thanasanti Bhikkhuni in 2009–2010 in Colorado Springs; and the Los Angeles residence of Ven. Susila Bhikkhuni; and the residence of Ven. Wimala Bhikkhuni in the mid-west.)

In 2010, in Northern California, four novice nuns were given the full bhikkhuni ordination in the Thai Theravada tradition, which included the double ordination ceremony. Bhante Gunaratana and other monks and nuns were in attendance. It was the first such ordination ever in the Western hemisphere.

Bhante Gunaratana is currently the abbot of the Bhavana Society, a monastery and meditation retreat center that he founded in High View, West Virginia.

=== S. N. Goenka ===
S. N. Goenka was a Burmese-born meditation teacher of the Vipassana movement. His teacher, Sayagyi U Ba Khin of Burma, was a contemporary of Māhāsi Sayādaw's, and taught a style of Buddhism with similar emphasis on simplicity and accessibility to laypeople. Goenka established a method of instruction popular in Asia and throughout the world. In 1981, he established the Vipassana Research Institute in Igatpuri, India, and his students built several centers in North America.

== Association of American Buddhists ==
The Association of American Buddhists was a group which promotes Buddhism through publications, ordination of monks, and classes.

Organized in 1960 by American practitioners of Theravada, Mahayana, and Vajrayana Buddhism, it does not espouse any particular school or schools of Buddhism. It respects all Buddhist traditions as equal, and encourages unity of Buddhism in thought and practice. It states that a different, American, form of Buddhism is possible, and that the cultural forms attached to the older schools of Buddhism need not necessarily be followed by westerners.

== Women and Buddhism ==
Rita M. Gross, a feminist religious scholar, claims that multiple people converted to Buddhism in the 1960s and 1970s as an attempt to combat traditional American values. However, in their conversion, they have created a new form of Buddhism distinctly Western in thought and practice. Democratization and the rise of women in leadership positions have been among the most influential characteristics of American Buddhism. However, another one of these characteristics is rationalism, which has allowed Buddhists to come to terms with the scientific and technological advances of the 21st century. Engagement in social issues, such as global warming, domestic violence, poverty and discrimination, has also shaped Buddhism in America. Privatization of ritual practices into home life has embodied Buddhism in America. The idea of living in the "present life" rather than focusing on the future or the past is also another characteristic of American Buddhism.

American Buddhism was able to embed these new religious ideals into such a historically rich religious tradition and culture due to the high conversion rate in the late 20th century. Three important factors led to this conversion in America: the importance of religion, societal openness, and spirituality. American culture places a large emphasis on having a personal religious identity as a spiritual and ethical foundation. During the 1960s and onward, society also became more open to other religious practices outside of Protestantism, allowing more people to explore Buddhism. People also became more interested in spiritual and experiential religion rather than the traditional institutional religions of the time.

The mass conversion of the 60s and 70s was also occurring alongside the second-wave feminist movement. While some of the women who became Buddhists at this time were drawn to its "gender neutral" teachings, in reality Buddhism is a traditionally patriarchal religion. These two conflicting ideas caused "uneasiness" with American Buddhist women. This uneasiness was further justified after 1983, when some male Buddhist teachers were exposed as "sexual adventurers and abusers of power." This spurred action among women in the American Buddhist community. After much dialogue within the community, including a series of conferences entitled "The Feminine in Buddhism", Sandy Boucher, a feminist-Buddhist teacher, interviewed over one hundred Buddhist women. She determined from their experiences and her own that American Buddhism has "the possibility for the creation of a religion fully inclusive of women's realities, in which women hold both institutional and spiritual leadership."

In recent years, there is a strong presence of women in American Buddhism, and a number of women are even in leadership roles. This also may be due to the fact that American Buddhism tends to stress democratization over the traditional hierarchical structure of Buddhism in Asia. One study of Theravada Buddhist centers in the U.S., however, found that although men and women thought that Buddhist teachings were gender-blind, there were still distinct gender roles in the organization, including more male guest teachers and more women volunteering as cooks and cleaners.

In 1936, Sunya Gladys Pratt was ordained as a Buddhist minister in the Shin tradition in the Tacoma, Washington.

In 1976, Karuna Dharma became the first fully ordained female member of the Buddhist monastic community in the U.S.

In 1981, Ani Pema Chodron, an American woman, was ordained as a bhikkhuni in a lineage of Tibetan Buddhism. Pema Chödrön was the first American woman to be ordained as a Buddhist nun in the Tibetan Buddhist tradition.

In 1988, Jetsunma Ahkon Lhamo, an American woman formerly called Catharine Burroughs, became the first Western woman to be named a reincarnate lama.

In 1998, Sherry Chayat became the first American woman to receive transmission in the Rinzai school of Buddhism.

In 2002, Khenmo Drolma, an American woman, became the first bhikkhuni in the Drikung Kagyu lineage of Buddhism, traveling to Taiwan to be ordained. In 2004 she became the first westerner of either sex to be installed as an abbot in the Drikung Kagyu lineage of Buddhism, being installed as the abbot of the Vajra Dakini Nunnery in Vermont (America's first Tibetan Buddhist nunnery) in 2004.

In 2003, Ayya Sudhamma Bhikkhuni became the first American-born woman to gain bhikkhuni ordination in the Theravada school in Sri Lanka.

In 2006, Merle Kodo Boyd, born in Texas, became the first African-American woman ever to receive Dharma transmission in Zen Buddhism.

In 2010, the first Tibetan Buddhist nunnery in America (Vajra Dakini Nunnery in Vermont), offering novice ordination in the Drikung Kagyu lineage of Buddhism, was officially consecrated.

In 2022, Terri Omori is appointed the first female president of the 12,000 member strong Buddhist Churches of America.

== Issues in American convert Buddhism ==
=== Engaged Buddhism ===
Socially engaged Buddhism has developed in Buddhism in the West. While some critics assert the term is redundant, as it is mistaken to believe that Buddhism in the past has not affected and been affected by the surrounding society, others have suggested that Buddhism is sometimes seen as too passive toward public life. This is particularly true in the West, where almost all converts to Buddhism come to it outside of an existing family or community tradition. Engaged Buddhism is an attempt to apply Buddhist values to larger social problems, including war and environmental concerns. The term was coined by Thích Nhất Hạnh, during his years as a peace activist in Vietnam. The Buddhist Peace Fellowship was founded in 1978 by Robert Aitken, Anne Aitken, Nelson Foster, and others and received early assistance from Gary Snyder, Jack Kornfield, and Joanna Macy. Another engaged Buddhist group is the Zen Peacemaker Order, founded in 1996 by Bernie Glassman and Sandra Jishu Holmes. In 2007, the American Buddhist scholar-monk, Ven. Bhikkhu Bodhi, was invited to write an editorial essay for the Buddhist magazine Buddhadharma. In his essay, he called attention to the narrowly inward focus of American Buddhism, which has been pursued to the neglect of the active dimension of Buddhist compassion expressed through programs of social engagement. Several of Ven. Bodhi's students who read the essay felt a desire to follow up on his suggestions. After a few rounds of discussions, they resolved to form a Buddhist relief organization dedicated to alleviating the suffering of the poor and disadvantaged in the developing world. At the initial meetings, seeking a point of focus, they decided to direct their relief efforts at the problem of global hunger, especially by supporting local efforts by those in developing countries to achieve self-sufficiency through improved food productivity. Contacts were made with leaders and members of other Buddhist communities in the greater New York area, and before long Buddhist Global Relief emerged as an inter-denominational organization comprising people of different Buddhist groups who share the vision of a Buddhism actively committed to the task of alleviating social and economic suffering.

=== Misconduct ===
A number of groups and individuals have been implicated in scandals. Sandra Bell has analysed the scandals at Vajradhatu and the San Francisco Zen Center and concluded that these kinds of scandals are most likely to occur in organisations that are in transition between the pure forms of charismatic authority that brought them into being and more rational, corporate forms of organization". She also highlights the student-teacher dynamic and the significance of a spiritual leader in the West, where lay Buddhist are likely focused on practices such as meditation. This teacher must know the student to guide them through difficulties, and the student must be trusting and open with the teacher, this can be a powerful opportunity but also opens the door to potential issues.

Ford states that no one can express the "hurt and dismay" these events brought to each center, and that the centers have in a number of cases emerged stronger because they no longer depend on a "single charismatic leader".

Robert Sharf also mentions charisma from which institutional power is derived, and the need to balance charismatic authority with institutional authority. Elaborate analyses of these scandals are made by Stuart Lachs, who mentions the uncritical acceptance of religious narratives, such as lineages and dharma transmission, which aid in giving uncritical charismatic powers to teachers and leaders.

Following is a partial list from reliable sources, limited to the United States and by no means all-inclusive.

- In 1983, the San Francisco Zen Center experienced a sex scandal resulting in the resignation of abbot Richard Baker.
- Taizan Maezumi slept with several of his students at the Zen Center of Los Angeles and he died of alcoholism.
- In 1988, Seung Sahn had sexual affairs with several of his students in the Kwan Um School of Zen.
- Tibetan Buddhist teacher Chögyam Trungpa openly had sexual relationships with numbers of female members of his sangha, and died of health complications from his quite public alcoholism.
- Trungpa's Dharma heir Ösel Tendzin contracted and later died from complications of the AIDS virus. Knowing himself to be infected, Tendzin had unprotected sex with at least two of his male students. One of them later died of AIDS.
- In 2010, Shasta Abbey abbot and successor to Houn Jiyu-Kennett Eko Little resigned and subsequently disrobed after admitting to forming a sexual relationship with one of the members of the lay congregation.
- In 2010, Eido Tai Shimano retired from the Zen Studies Society after admitting to sexual liaisons.
- In 2011 because of sexual misconduct, Dennis Merzel said he would disrobe as a Buddhist priest and resign as an elder of the White Plum Asanga.
- Several women have accused Joshu Sasaki of making sexual advances over the course of decades, and scandal struck the Cimarron Zen Center in Los Angeles.
- In 2025, founder and former abbot of Sokukoji, Sokuzan Bob Brown, was formally disrobed for having numerous sexual relationships with students and sangha members that have caused harm.

=== Accreditation ===
Definitions and policies may differ greatly between different schools or sects: for example, "many, perhaps most" Soto priests "see no distinction between ordination and Dharma transmission". Disagreement and misunderstanding exist on this point, among lay practitioners and Zen teachers alike.

James Ford writes,

[S]urprising numbers of people use the titles Zen teacher, master, roshi and sensei without any obvious connections to Zen [...] Often they obfuscate their Zen connections, raising the very real question whether they have any authentic relationship to the Zen world at all. In my studies I've run across literally dozens of such cases.

James Ford claims that about eighty percent of authentic teachers in the United States belong to the American Zen Teachers Association or the Soto Zen Buddhist Association and are listed on their websites. This can help a prospective student sort out who is a "normative stream" teacher from someone who is perhaps not, but of course twenty percent do not participate.

== Demographics of Buddhism in the United States ==
=== Numbers of Buddhists ===
Accurate counts of Buddhists in the United States are difficult. Self-description has pitfalls. Because Buddhism is a cultural concept, individuals who self-describe as Buddhists may have little knowledge or commitment to Buddhism as a religion or practice; on the other hand, others may be deeply involved in meditation and committed to the Dharma, but may refuse the label "Buddhist". In the 1990s, Robert A. F. Thurman estimated there were 5 to 6 million Buddhists in America.

According to a 2020 survey by the Pew Research Center, Buddhism was the third-largest religion in the United States, accounting for 1.3% of the population (approximately 4.4 million people). It followed Christianity, which comprised 64.0% (217.3 million), and the religiously unaffiliated, at 29.7% (100.9 million), while Judaism accounted for 1.7% (5.7 million).

In a 2007 Pew Research Center survey, at 0.7% Buddhism was the third largest religion in the US after Christianity (78.4%), no religion (10.3%) and Judaism (1.7%). In 2012 on the occasion of a visit from the Dalai Lama, U-T San Diego said there are 1.2 million Buddhist practitioners in the U.S., and of them 40% live in Southern California.

In 2008 the "Pew Forum on Religion and Public Life Religious Landscape Survey" estimated American Buddhists at 0.7% of the American population. During the same year the American Religious Identification Survey (ARIS), estimated this same figure at 0.5%. ARIS estimated that the number of adherents rose by 170% between 1990 and 2000, reaching 1.2 million followers in 2008. According to William Wilson Quinn "by all indications that remarkable rate of growth continues unabated." But according to Robert Thurman,

Scholars are unsure whether the reports are accurate, as Americans who might dabble in various forms of Buddhism may not identify themselves as Buddhist on a survey. That makes it difficult to quantify the number of Buddhists in the United States.

Others argued, in 2012, that Buddhists made up 1 percent of the American population (about three million people). By the year 2050 Buddhism is projected to become the third largest major religious group in North America, after Christianity and Islam.

=== Demographics of Buddhist Converts ===
A sociological survey conducted in 1999 found that relative to the US population as a whole, Buddhist converts are proportionately more likely to be white, upper middle class, highly educated, and left-leaning in their political views. In terms of race, only 10% of survey respondents indicated they were a race other than white, a matter that has been cause of some concern among Buddhist leaders. Nearly a third of the respondents were college graduates, and more than half held advanced degrees. Politically, 60% identified themselves as Democrats, and Green Party affiliations outnumbered Republicans by 3 to 1. Buddhist converts were also proportionately more likely to have come from Catholic, and especially Jewish backgrounds. More than half of these adherents came to Buddhism through reading books on the topic, with the rest coming by way of martial arts and friends or acquaintances. The average age of the respondents was 46. Daily meditation was their most commonly cited Buddhist practice, with most meditating 30 minutes a day or more.

In 2015 a Pew Foundation survey found 67% of American Buddhists were raised in a religion other than Buddhism. 61% said their spouse has a religion other than Buddhism. It also showed that one-third of Buddhists in America are of Asian descent, while the remaining three-fourths are converts to Buddhism. The survey was conducted only in English and Spanish, and may under-estimate Buddhist immigrants who speak Asian languages. A 2012 Pew study found Buddhism is practiced by 15% of surveyed Chinese Americans, 6% of Koreans, 25% of Japanese, 43% of Vietnamese and 1% of Filipinos.

=== Ethnic divide ===
Although the 2008 Pew Landscape Study suggested white Americans made up the majority of Buddhists in the United States, subsequent research has refuted this conclusion, first on the study's small data set, second on significant methodological errors, and third on subsequent research published by Pew in the 2012 survey of religious life of Asian Americans. Based on this latter study's data, Asian American Buddhists make up approximately 67–69% of all Buddhists in the United States.

Discussion about Buddhism in America has sometimes focused on the issue of the visible ethnic divide separating ethnic Buddhist congregations from import Buddhist groups. Although multiple Zen and Tibetan Buddhist temples were founded by Asians, they now attract fewer Asian-Americans. With the exception of Sōka Gakkai, almost all active Buddhist groups in America are either ethnic or import Buddhism based on the demographics of their membership. There is often limited contact between Buddhists of different ethnic groups.

However, the cultural divide should not necessarily be seen as pernicious. It is often argued that the differences between Buddhist groups arise benignly from the differing needs and interests of those involved. Convert Buddhists tend to be interested in meditation and philosophy, in some cases eschewing the trappings of religiosity altogether. On the other hand, for immigrants and their descendants, preserving tradition and maintaining a social framework assume a much greater relative importance, making their approach to religion naturally more conservative. Further, based on a survey of Asian-American Buddhists in San Francisco, "many Asian-American Buddhists view non-Asian Buddhism as still in a formative, experimental stage" and yet they believe that it "could eventually mature into a religious expression of exceptional quality".

Additional questions come from the demographics within import Buddhism. The majority of American converts practicing at Buddhist centers are white, often from Christian or Jewish backgrounds. Only Sōka Gakkai has attracted significant numbers of African-American or Latino members. A variety of ideas have been broached regarding the nature, causes, and significance of this racial uniformity.

Tricycle (an American Buddhist journal) in 2004, noted that SGI has specifically targeted African-Americans, Latinos and Asians, and other writers have noted that this approach has begun to spread, with Vipassana and Theravada retreats aimed at non-white practitioners led by a handful of specific teachers.

A question is the degree of importance ascribed to discrimination, which is suggested to be mostly unconscious, on the part of white converts toward potential minority converts. To some extent, the racial divide indicates a class divide, because convert Buddhists tend to be more educated. Among African American Buddhists who commented on the dynamics of the racial divide in convert Buddhism are Jan Willis and Charles R. Johnson.

A Pew study shows that Americans tend to be less biased towards Buddhists when compared to other religions, such as Christianity, to which 18% of people were biased, when only 14% were biased towards Buddhists. American Buddhists are often not raised as Buddhists, with 32% of American Buddhists being raised Protestant, and 22% being raised Catholic, which means that over half of the American Buddhists were converted at some point in time. Also, Buddhism has had to adapt to America in order to garner more followers so that the concept would not seem so foreign, so they adopted "Catholic" words such as "worship" and "churches".

== Buddhist education in the United States ==
Chögyam Trungpa founded Naropa Institute in Boulder, Colorado, a four-year Buddhist college in the US (now Naropa University) in 1974. Allen Ginsberg was an initial faculty member, christening the institute's poetry department the "Jack Kerouac School of Disembodied Poetics". Now Naropa University, the school offers accredited degrees in a number of subjects, many not directly related to Buddhism.

The University of the West is affiliated with Hsi Lai Temple and was previously Hsi Lai University. Soka University of America, in Aliso Viejo California, was founded by the Sōka Gakkai as a secular school committed to philosophic Buddhism. The City of Ten Thousand Buddhas is the site of Dharma Realm Buddhist University, a four-year college teaching courses primarily related to Buddhism but including some general-interest subjects. The Institute of Buddhist Studies in Berkeley, California, in addition to offering a master's degree in Buddhist Studies acts as the ministerial training arm of the Buddhist Churches of America and is affiliated with the Graduate Theological Union. The school moved into the Jodo Shinshu Center in Berkeley.

The first Buddhist high school in the United States, Developing Virtue Secondary School, was founded in 1981 by the Dharma Realm Buddhist Association at their branch monastery in the City of Ten Thousand Buddhas in Ukiah, California. In 1997, the Purple Lotus Buddhist School offered elementary-level classes in Union City, California, affiliated with the True Buddha School; it added a middle school in 1999 and a high school in 2001. Another Buddhist high school, Tinicum Art and Science now The Lotus School of Liberal Arts, which combines Zen practice and traditional liberal arts, opened in Ottsville, Pennsylvania, in 1998. It is associated informally with the World Shim Gum Do Association in Boston. The Pacific Buddhist Academy opened in Honolulu, Hawaii, in 2003. It shares a campus with the Hongwanji Mission School, an elementary and middle school; both schools affiliated with the Honpa Hongwanji Jodo Shinshu mission.

Juniper Foundation, founded in 2003, holds that Buddhist methods must become integrated into modern culture just as they were in other cultures. Juniper Foundation calls its approach "Buddhist training for modern life" and it emphasizes meditation, balancing emotions, cultivating compassion and developing insight as four building blocks of Buddhist training.

== See also ==
- Buddhists in the United States military
- Bhikkhu Bodhi
- Pariyatti (bookstore), sole distributor of Buddhist Publication Society in North America
- Walk for Peace
- Shambhala Publications
- Lion's Roar (magazine)
- Buddhism in the West
- Buddhism in Costa Rica
- Buddhism in Canada
- Index of Buddhism-related articles
- New religious movement
- Religion in the United States
- Secular Buddhism

== Sources ==
- Ford, James Ishmael (2006). Zen Master Who?. Wisdom Publications. ISBN 978-0-86171-509-1.
- King, Winston L. (1992), Theravada Meditation. The Buddhist Transformation of Yoga, Delhi: Motilal Banarsidass
- Koster, Frits (2009), Basisprincipes Vipassana-meditatie. Mindfulness als weg naar bevrijdend inzicht, Asoka
- Nyanaponika (1998), Het hart van boeddhistische meditatie (The heart of Buddhist Meditation), Asoka
- Prebish, Charles S. (1999). Luminous Passage: The Practice and Study of Buddhism and America. University of California Press. ISBN 978-0-520-21697-6.
- Seager, Richard Hughes (1999). Buddhism in America. Columbia University Press. ISBN 978-0-231-10868-3.
