= Dharma Seed =

Dharma Seed is non-profit organization "dedicated to preserving and sharing the spoken teachings of Theravada Buddhism in modern languages".

== History ==
"Dharma Seed began in 1983 when Bill Hamilton, a volunteer at Insight Meditation Society (IMS) in Barre, Massachusetts, began taping the dharma talks and meditation instructions offered there. His small project soon grew into a separate nonprofit organization, and Dharma Seed Tape Library began to spread the seeds of the dharma to the world by selling audiotapes of teachings. The original mission was simply to 'preserve and share the dharma,' which Dharma Seed continues to do today — with one critical change: The teachings are now offered based on the principle of dana, or the Buddhist practice of generosity. "

Originally, the tapes were "for the benefit of people who were not in the hall at the time of the talk, and the immense value of this material for posterity soon became evident. In 1984 the project incorporated as a non-profit religious organization, became Dharma Seed Tape Library, and moved out into the world. We’ve been doing this for almost sixteen years now. I was one of the original directors, and have been involved since the beginning," said Judy Phillips, Director of the Dharma Seed Archive.

By 1985, Dharma Seed Tape Libraries had started to gain notoriety among Western "Spiritual Pilgrims". Dharma Seed was one of "the growing number of organizations offering high quality cassettes" for the purpose of self-transformation. The May 1985 issue of Yoga Journal encouraged its readers to take advantage of the emerging availability of "'spiritual' cassette tapes" from the privacy of their home, car or Walkman headphones. From then on, "spiritual pilgrims have never had it so easy!" After a decade, the American vipassana movement was still largely concentrated in three states – California, New York and Massachusetts. Through offering the teachings given at Insight Meditation Society (IMS) by mail order, Dharma Seed allowed the teachings to become available to those in regions lacking significant vipassana offerings.

"On the last night of [a meditation retreat], the ashes of Bill Hamilton, founder of the Dharma Seed Tape Library, were brought to Cloud Mountain. Bill had lived on Whidbey Island and had many friends in the Seattle sangha. In March of that year, Bill was told he had pancreatic cancer. A woman on the retreat outlined the story of his hospitalization and surgery, amazed at how affable and pleasant he had been through his suffering. Bill had wanted to be buried whole underneath an apple tree, but since such burials weren't allowed in Washington, a small apple tree was bought, a hole dug by the pond here, and his ashes were sent."

== Etymology ==
The organization derives its name from the concept of a Dharma seed. "Seeds like this are the ideal object of reflection in the vipassana sense. It is not enough merely to have a bare, undigested idea of a topic like 'impermanence'... We need a Dharma Seed – an idea that has developed numerous facets of meaning for us. The more we reflect on the Dharma, the more Dharma seeds will emerge for us, and the more genuine topics we shall have for vipassana meditation."

== Oral history ==
Dharma Seed highlights the importance of preserving the oral transmission of Dharma teachings. Alan Reder wrote that although "[books] still offer the greatest variety of material, plus unmatched depth and detail. However, they sometimes yield only the faintest impression of the people who wrote them, and that can make a crucial difference with wise beings whose inspiring presence is part of their teaching... Fortunately, we can also 'meet' almost any great teacher on audio and video recordings... Dharma Seed picks up where the Buddha left off 2,500 years ago: distributing the dharma without charge... The celebs you'll expect – Jack Kornfield, Joseph Goldstein, Sylvia Boorstein, Sharon Salzberg – are all voluminously represented in the catalog."

== Dharma centers ==
Dharma Seed hosts audio recordings of Dharma Talks given at over 40 centers worldwide.
