= Mount Baldy Zen Center =

Buddhist monastery in California, U.S.

Coordinates: 34.250247°N 117.638583°W

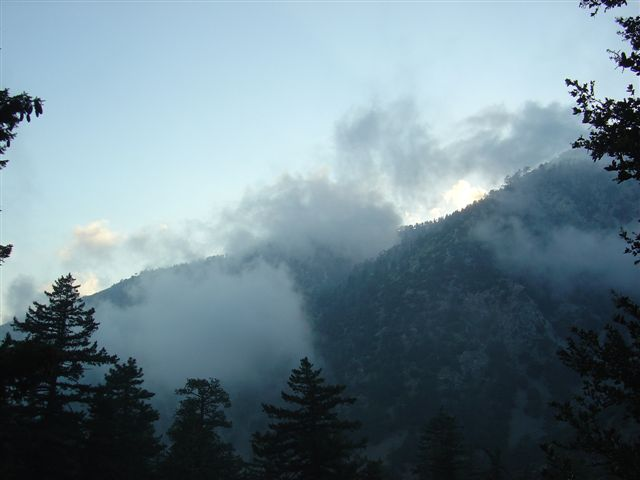

Religion
- Affiliation: Rinzai

Location
- Location: Mount Baldy, California
- Country: United States
- Interactive map of Mount Baldy Zen Center

Architecture
- Founder: Kyozan Joshu Sasaki
- Completed: 1971

Website
- www.mbzc.org

Mount Baldy Zen Center (MBZC) is a Rinzai Zen monastery of the Nyorai-nyokyo sect, located in the San Gabriel Mountains of the Angeles National Forest region on 4.5 acres (18,000 m^{2}) and founded in 1971 by Kyozan Joshu Sasaki. The monastery—once a Boy Scout camp—became famous when musician Leonard Cohen joined the community in 1994. The monastery served as residence for Sasaki, and is the training center for monastics in his lineage. Other centers in Sasaki's network, including Rinzai-ji, offer the opportunity to practice Zen to laypeople in the lineage. Sasaki died in 2014 at the age of 107.

== Gallery ==
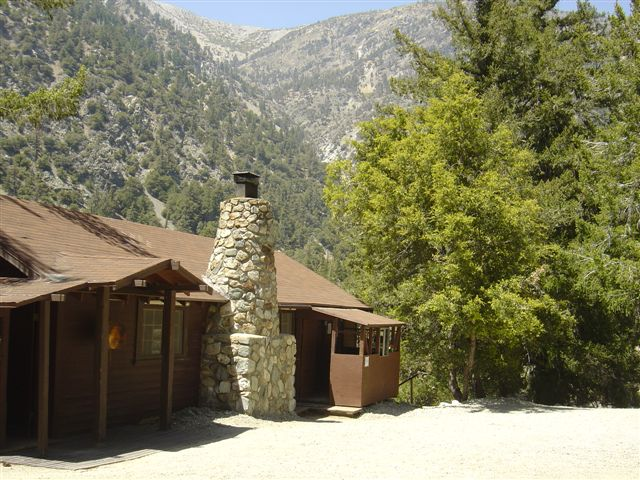

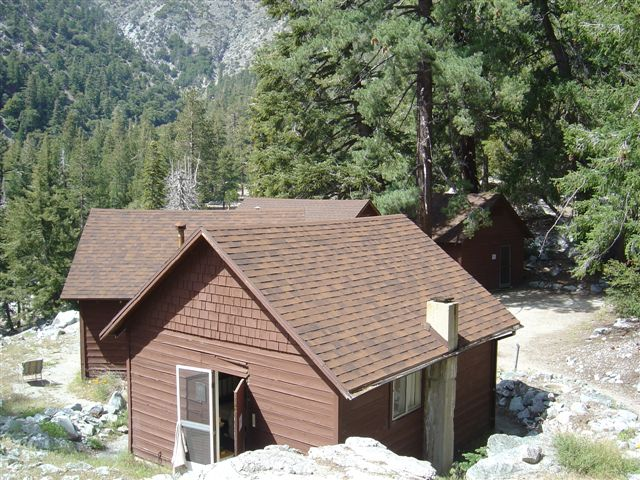

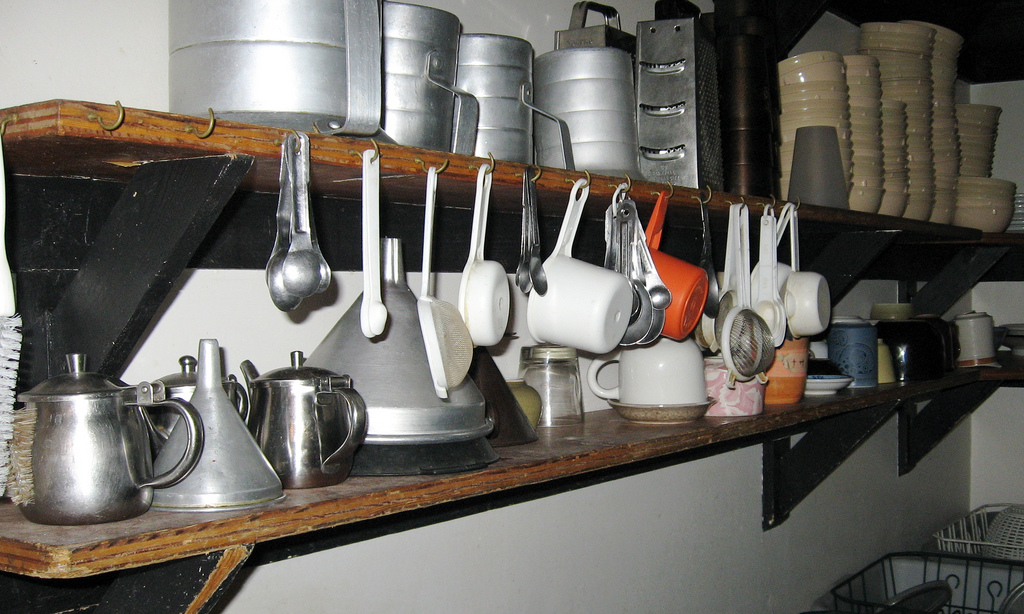

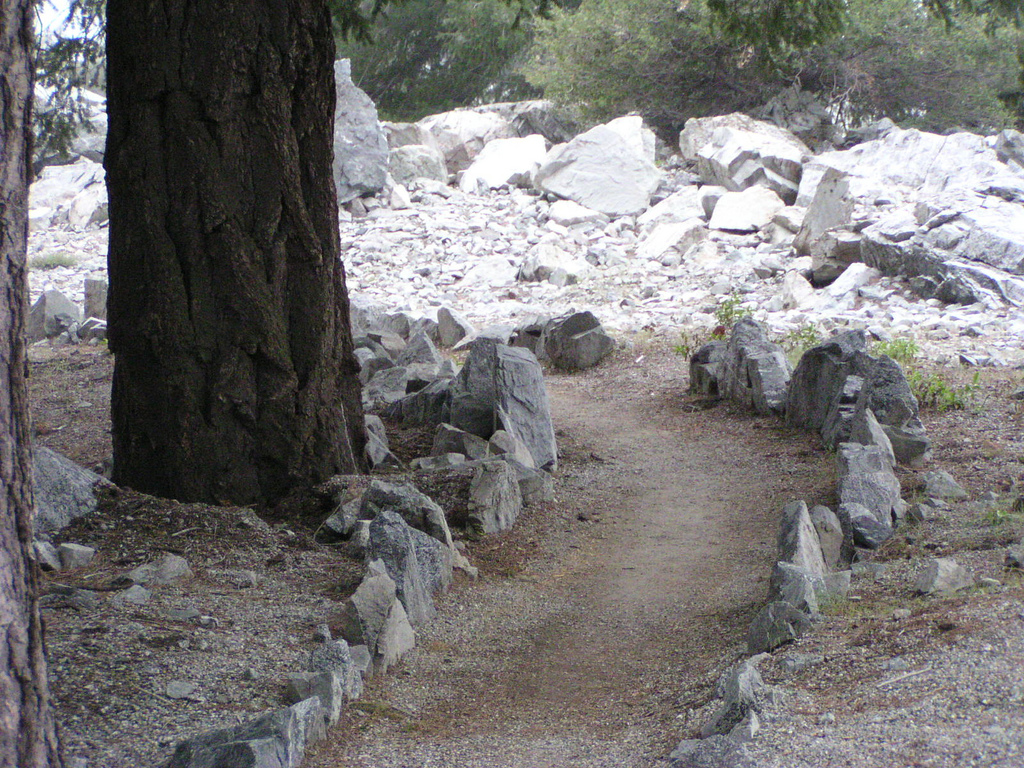

== See also ==
- Buddhism in the United States
- Timeline of Zen Buddhism in the United States
