= Kyozan Joshu Sasaki =

Japanese Rinzai Zen teacher (1907–2014)

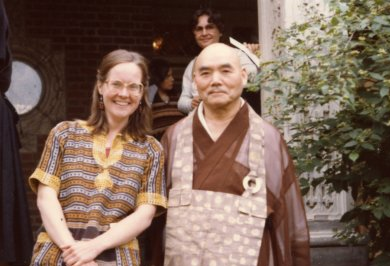
- Mary Gilliland & Joshu Sasaki
- Title: Roshi

Personal life
- Born: April 1, 1907 Japan
- Died: July 27, 2014 (aged 107) Los Angeles, California

Religious life
- Religion: Buddhism
- School: Rinzai

Senior posting
- Teacher: Joten Soko Miura|Joten Soko Miura Roshi
- Based in: Mount Baldy Zen Center; Bodhi Manda Zen Center; Rinzai-Ji Zen Center

Kyozan Joshu Sasaki (佐々木承周, Sasaki Jōshū), Roshi (April 1, 1907 – July 27, 2014) was a Japanese Rinzai Zen teacher who lived in Los Angeles, United States since 1962. He sought to tailor his teachings to westerners, opening dozens of centres, and founding serving as head abbot of the Mount Baldy Zen Center, near Mount Baldy in California, and of the Rinzai-Ji order of affiliated Zen centers. Sasaki Roshi was one of the most influential but also controversial Zen masters in America, "coercing hundreds of [students] into having sexual contact with him" since at least the early 1970s, including using threats of expulsion.

== Biography ==
Joshu Sasaki became an ordained monk at age thirteen under his teacher, Joten Soko Miura. Soon after, he followed Joten Soko Miura to Myoshin-ji, the head temple of one of the largest branches of Rinzai. Having been awarded the title of roshi in 1947, Kyozan Joshu Sasaki took the position of an abbot at Yotoku-in. In 1953 he was appointed abbot of Shojuan.

In 1962, at the request of Daiko Furukawa, Joshu decided to travel to the United States to teach students in the West, founding a Zen center in Los Angeles.

Joshu Sasaki regularly offered formal training sessions at both the Mount Baldy Zen Center and the Bodhi Manda Zen Center, occasionally offering sesshin at the Rinzai-Ji Zen Center in Los Angeles and Haku-un-ji Zen Center in Tempe, Arizona, as well as at numerous other centers on the American East Coast, and in Europe. His teaching could be characterized as direct, challenging and uncompromising; he maintained a rigorous training and teaching schedule well into his 90's. Joshu Sasaki's public and retreat talks centred on "Tathagata Zen", and he very often used the Rinzai Roku and Blue Cliff Record as starting points for his lectures and teishos. Towards the end of his life, his teaching schedule greatly depended on his health. In early February 2012, at the age of 104, Joshu Roshi became ill with aspiration pneumonia and did not teach at MBZC (or any affiliate Zen Center) again. On November 10, at a dedication ceremony for the Zendo remodel, Joshu Roshi officially resigned as abbot of the Mount Baldy Zen Center for health reasons.

Joshu Sasaki has given full Rinzai priest ordination to approximately 20 students, which grants them the title oshō. But Kyozan Joshu Sasaki did not give dharma transmission, which is in Rinzai the qualification needed to train students in a training hall to become a priest. Nevertheless, several of his students are recognized by their community "as wise guides of various communities". Although he had no official "dharma heirs," followers of Sasaki founded about 30 Zen centers around the world.

One of his best known students was Canadian poet and singer-songwriter Leonard Cohen, who served as personal assistant to Joshu Sasaki during his 1990s seclusion to the Mt. Baldy monastery. Many of the poems in Cohen's 2006 Book of Longing refer to Mt. Baldy and Joshu Sasaki (mostly referred to as "Roshi").

Writing under the pen name Shozan Jack Haubner, another student of Sasaki Roshi's has published partially fictionalized books and essays which refer to Sasaki Roshi's teachings and describe everyday life in Rinzai-Ji affiliated Zen centers.

In a 24 December 2009 interview Eshin Godfrey, Abbot of the Zen Centre of Vancouver and a student of Sasaki-roshi, said of his teacher,

He has become a precious golden Buddha! You can only have great gratitude for your teacher, even though I've found it a bitter-sweet relationship. As the western styles of Zen develop I'm grateful to have started study in the traditional way.

Joshu Sasaki died at Cedars Sinai Hospital in Los Angeles on July 27, 2014, aged 107.

== Financial misconduct ==
Although not widely known outside Japan until recent years, in 1954, Sasaki was convicted in Japan by the Sendai District Court in a criminal proceeding, confirmed upon rehearing by the Sendai High Court, and sentenced to serve 8 months in prison, for misuse and misappropriation of temple funds during Sasaki's time overseeing the finances of Zuiganji Temple. It was reported that the appellate court imposed actual imprisonment upon finding that a portion of the misappropriated funds were used for "a pleasure/spending spree [遊興費]" in a way "inappropriate for a religious figure/man of the cloth (宗教家)," including payments to several women. In an interview with a reporter at the time, Sasaki said, "With regard to the matter of women, this is my distress as a human being." Eight years after his release from prison, Sasaki was dispatched from Japan to the United States.

== Sexual misconduct ==
Sasaki Roshi was among a generation of missionary Buddhist teachers accused of improper relations with his students. He was one of four major Zen teachers who came to the United States in the 1960s and had a major impact on the growth of Zen in America; the others teachers were Shunryu Suzuki, Eido Shimano, Taizan Maezumi. All but Suzuki were involved with widely publicized scandals involving sexual impropriety. The complex roots of such behavior in Buddhist communities both in Japan and in the United States remain under investigation. In light of these significant abuses of authority, the Buddhists in the United States have developed statements on ethics and various guidelines for prospective students to apply in choosing a teacher.

In 1997, members of his Mt. Baldy Zen Center wrote a letter alleging that Sasaki Roshi was engaging in sexual misconduct with his female students.

With sadness and confusion we have struggled with your sexual behavior toward women. In the past open discussion was discouraged, and people were left feeling afraid to raise their concerns about this matter. But this fall we have been meeting to air our concerns and to try to come to a better understanding of the problem.

Stephen Wilder, a monk who was ordained in 1977, wrote a resignation letter in 1982, also alleging sexual harassment:

It wasn't until his Inji, who was engaged to be married, came bursting into my room at Bodhi Mandala in New Mexico after lunch one day during an autumn session, sobbing and saying, "He won't leave me alone", that it finally dawned on me that this was real. Until then I truly did not believe any of the rumors because of my own conditioned ignorance.

A student of Joshu Roshi, Giko David Rubin, raised concerns about Roshi's sexual conduct to Joshu Roshi himself as well as his inner circle. Rubin wrote:

Joshu Roshi told me I would never get enlightened if I thought about these things. I was told by one Osho and one senior student I would be blamed for Joshu Roshi's death if I tried to make him change his behavior, and that I would be responsible for ruining his legacy. "You are killing him!" was shouted at me more than once.

In 2012, Eshu Martin, a former monk in the Rinzai-ji community and student of Sasaki, also publicly accused Sasaki, who was then 105 years old, of sexual misconduct with students.

According to the New York Times, some students posted in message boards that Sasaki would tell them that sexual contact with a Zen master (roshi) like him would help them attain new levels of “non-attachment,” one of Zen’s main objectives. If they resisted, he used intimidation and threats of expulsion.

A February 2013 article in the Albuquerque Journal wrote:

In early January, the senior teachers of Sasaki's community admitted in an on-line statement that the community "has struggled with our teacher Joshu Sasaki Roshi's sexual misconduct for a significant portion of his career in the United States."

== See also ==
- Rinzai school
- Myoshin-ji
- Mount Baldy Zen Center
- List of Rinzai Buddhists
- Buddhism in the United States
- Timeline of Zen Buddhism in the United States
- Leonard Cohen

== Sources ==
- Blumenthal, Ralph (December 9, 2007). "A Very Old Zen Master and His Art of Tough Love". New York Times.
- Borup, Jørn (2008), Japanese Rinzai Zen Buddhism: Myōshinji, a Living Religion, Brill
- Ford, James Ishmael (2006), Zen Master Who?: A Guide to the People And Stories of Zen, Wisdom Publications
- Vitello, Paul (August 4, 2014). "Obituary: Joshu Sasaki, 107, Tainted Zen Master". New York Times.
