= Young Buddhist Association =

Logo of the Young Buddhist Association.

The Young Buddhist Association (YBA) is an auxiliary lay group of the Buddhist Churches of America, the mainland U.S. branch of Jodo Shinshu Buddhism. Founded in 1974 and originally known as the "Young Men's Buddhist Association" (YMBA, which was modeled after YMCA), the YBA began as a way to offer communal activities for young Japanese-American Shin Buddhist men in the United States. It has evolved into an organization that is comprised usually of young teen boys and girls who are members of Shin temples, and is not limited to any one ethnicity. Many Shin temples have YBA groups, which organize fun activities and overnight trips for their young people. Regional conferences are scheduled yearly in which YBA groups from different temples may mingle and share ideas and friendship.

== See also ==
- Young Men's Buddhist Association, a separately-constituted organization in Sri Lanka
- Young Men's Buddhist Association (Burma), a separately-constituted organization in Myanmar
- Young Buddhist Association (Indonesia), a separately-constituted organization in Indonesia
