= Shozan Jack Haubner =

Shozan Jack Haubner is the pen name of a Zen monk who has written two books and a number of essays for The Sun, Tricycle, Buddhadharma, Lion's Roar and the New York Times, and the Best Buddhist Writing series. He won the Pushcart Prize in 2012. Haubner's books, portions of which have been excerpted in essays, present partially fictionalized accounts of life with Kyozan Joshu Sasaki and associated Rinzai-Ji zen centers.

== Early life ==
Shozan was born and raised in a Catholic family. He studied philosophy and worked as a screenwriter, poet and a comedian in Los Angeles, United States before becoming a Buddhist Zen priest.

== Books ==
- Zen Confidential: Confessions of a Wayward Monk
- Single White Monk: Tales of Death, Failure, and Bad Sex (Although Not Necessarily in That Order)
