= Modern Buddhism =

Modern Buddhism may refer to:

- Contemporary Buddhism
- Buddhist modernism, new movements based on modern era reinterpretations of Buddhism
- Buddhism in the West
  - Buddhism in Europe
  - Buddhism in the United States
