= Pohwa =

Pohwa Sunim (born July 15, 1955) is the head monk of the Young Pyung Sa International Zen Center in South Korea.

== Biography ==
Sunim is the disciple of Myo Vong who is the Dharma successor of Hye Am. Pohwa Sunim founded the World Zen Fellowship in 1994 which includes the Potomac Zen Sangha, the Patriarchal Zen Society and the Baltimore Zen Center. He is known for his teaching and direct presentation style. He pioneered the use of “Cyber Zen” (Information Age technology) to propagate his teachings in the West, including the early use of web sites, user groups, and video tele-conferencing. He produced a series of teaching videos in 2004 called “Zen Dharma Exchange”, which are widely available on the internet. He is a frequent speaker at American universities (Columbia, Georgetown, Naropa University, George Washington, the University of Maryland) and religious gatherings. (1)

== Teaching ==
The focus of his teaching is to learn Buddha's enlightened mind through the practice of the koan, a story or question that cannot be understood by logical thinking but only through intuitive thinking. The focus is on attaining the true nature of all beings directly through intuitive thinking. This mind-to-mind teaching is the core teaching of the Korean Buddhist Chogye Order and is now being spread throughout the world by lineage masters such as Pohwa Sunim. “If you want to know the answer, you must see your ‘original mind’ which is the ‘original mind’ of all sages and all beings.” (2)(3)

Some of his more frequently employed phrases include, “Dogs chase mudballs. A lion bites the thrower”, and “ An apple is an apple. An orange is an orange. They are not the same. They are not different.” (4)
