= Young Buddhist Association (Indonesia) =

Indonesian non-profit organization

Young Buddhist Association Indonesia
- Formation: 27 May 2016
- Purpose: Youth Buddhist Development
- Headquarters: Surabaya, Indonesia
- Origins: Indonesia
- Region served: Indonesia
- Chairman of the Board of Trustees: Billy Lukito Joeswanto
- Chairman: Limanyono Tanto
- Website: yba.or.id

The Young Buddhist Association Indonesia (YBAI) is a non-profit organization based in Surabaya, Indonesia.

== Overview ==
Young Buddhist Association Indonesia is a youth organization that promotes youth leadership development and the study of the Buddha's Dharma.

Buddhism is divided into three major sects: Theravada, Mahayana, and Vajrayana. Young Buddhist Association (YBA) Indonesia is composed of young people from many Buddhist sects and is led by Yayasan Muda Mudi Buddhis Bersatu. Despite the differences between the sects that these young people belong to, they create even more distinct and unique connections that allow them to complement one another. Buddhism's various schools (sects) are comparable to the various clothing choices people make on a daily basis, which preserves the core of Buddha's teachings in all of them. In this context, young Buddhists not just an organization to advance in Dharma but also a chance to thrive in this religiously diverse Indonesian culture.

In the early years of establishing the community, YBAI transcended sectarianism, despite opposition from those who did not have a deep knowledge of Dharma.

== History ==
Young Buddhist Association was founded by Billy Lukito Joeswanto who is also the current chairman of the Board of Trustees of the organization.

The organization also organizes events such as Sarasehan Kebangsaan, Vesak Festival, Fangsheng, and Mindful Festival.
