= Michael Roach =

American Buddhist writer

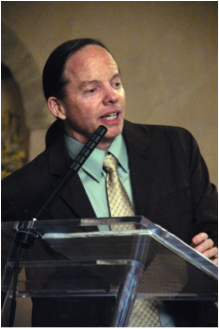

Personal life
- Born: Michael Roach; December 17, 1952 (age 73) Los Angeles, California, United States
- Education: Princeton University; Sera Monastery
- Website: geshemichaelroach.com

Religious life
- Religion: Buddhism
- School: Gelugpa (Reformed)
- Dharma name: Geshe Lobsang Chunzin

Senior posting
- Based in: Phoenix, Arizona

Michael Roach (born December 17, 1952) is an American businessman, spiritual leader, and Buddhist monk by the name Geshe Lobsang Chunzin, and scholar who has started a number of businesses and organizations, written books inspired by Buddhism, and translated Tibetan Buddhist teachings. He has at times been the center of controversy for his views, teachings, activities, and behavior.

== Early life and education ==
Michael Roach was born on 17 December 1952 in Los Angeles, California to traditional Episcopalian parents. He grew up in Phoenix, Arizona along with three brothers. After his high school graduation, he received the Presidential Scholars Medallion from U.S. President Richard Nixon, then attended Princeton University in 1972. He traveled to India in 1973 to seek Buddhist instruction, while still in college. He returned to the United States and received a scholarship to return to study in India in 1974. While in India, Roach learned about a Tibetan Buddhist monastery in New Jersey led by a Lhasa born lama, Sermey Khensur Lobsang Tharchin. Roach returned to Princeton, living at the monastery from 1975 to 1981. In the year before his graduation in 1975, both of his parents died due to cancer and then his brother committed suicide. In 1983 he was ordained as a Gelugpa Buddhist monk at Sera Monastery in South India, where he would periodically travel and study. In 1995, he became the first American to qualify for the Geshe degree.

== Career ==
From 1993 to 1999, Roach developed and taught 18 courses on Tibetan Buddhism in New York City. These courses were based on the training monks receive in Tibetan monasteries, but organized to be taught by laypeople .

From 2000 to 2003, Roach organized and led a three-year silent retreat in the Arizona desert with five other participants, including Christie McNally with whom Roach had a relationship and shared a room with during this time. The retreat was run along guidelines that fall outside of what is taught in the open teachings of Tibetan traditions.

In 2004, Roach established Diamond Mountain Center, a retreat center in Arizona.

In 1981, Khen Rinpoche, the teacher of Roach, challenged him to apply Buddhist values to the "dirtiest business and make it clean". Since then, Roach has helped to found and develop the corporation Andin International, a jewelry manufacturer based in New York. The activities of Andin International started with a loan of $50,000 and three employees. By the time Roach left the firm in 1999 as vice president, the company's annual turnover was $100 million per year. In 2009, Andin achieved a turnover of more than 200 million dollars, and was acquired by Richline Group Warren Buffett. He used the money from his work to create funds to finance various projects, such as food fund Sera Mey. For seventeen years, and while studying Buddhism, Roach commuted to a day job in Manhattan.

In 1999, the publishing house Doubleday Corporation, which is now part of Penguin Random House, invited Roach to write a book about the style of management he used for business and life. In "The Diamond Cutter: The Buddha on Managing Your Business and Your Life", Roach explains how to apply the lessons of the Sutra of the Diamond Cutter (Diamond Sutra) in the context of business.

== Charity ==
In 1987, Roach founded the Asian Classics Input Project (ACIP). He founded this project in order to create a complete and accessible version of Kangyur and Tengyur in electronic form along with related philosophical commentaries and dictionaries. ACIP contains more than 8500 texts - almost half a million pages, which he provided for free, and has digitized 15286 books over the course of 31 years. It is one of many non-profits that sell Roach's teachings to the public.

ACIP donates to many causes. The Asian Classics Institute (ACI) pursued multiple projects to foster the learning and preservation of Tibetan Buddhism and meditation. These projects include organizations such as the Asian Legacy Library (ALL) and the Diamond Cutter Classics organization, and platforms like “The Knowledge Base” which offer free courses in a variety of subjects in multiple languages. The Asian Legacy Library alone has digitized over 16 million pages, according to Roach. In 2021, ACI launched the Castle Rock Fund as a vehicle to acquire the Castle Rock Mini Storage to finance the cost of ACIP's headquarters in Sedona, Arizona, and to ensure the financial stability of the organization.

== Controversies ==
=== Diamond business ===
Beginning in 1981, Roach helped found and run Andin International, a jewelry manufacturer based in New York. He used proceeds from his work to set up financial endowments to fund various projects, in particular the Sera Mey Food Fund.

In his 2015 book "A Death on Diamond Mountain", journalist Scott Carney wrote:

As for the chief diamond procurer at Andin International, Michael Roach selected Surat in the Indian state of Gujarat as his primary source for diamonds.

=== Marriage ===
In 1996, Christie McNally became Roach's student and they began a "spiritual partnership", a Buddhist practice that encourages both partners to reach extraordinary goals. The experiment included vowing to never be more than 15 feet (roughly 4.5 meters) apart, eating from the same plate, reading the same books together. They were married in a Christian ceremony in Rhode Island in 1998. The marriage was kept secret. When news of the marriage emerged in 2003, Roach explained to the New York Times that they had wished to honor their Christian heritage and that he wanted McNally to be entitled to his possessions if something happened to him. He also argued that the future of Buddhism in America relies on being more inclusive of and welcoming to women.

When Roach proposed to teach in Dharamshala in 2006, the Office of the Dalai Lama rebuffed his plan, stating that Roach's "unconventional behavior does not accord with His Holiness's teachings and practices"; the teaching took place in nearby Palampur instead.

McNally and Roach separated in the middle of 2009.

=== Sid Johnson's memoires ===
In 2005, during a tantric initiation practice, retreatant Sid Johnson, a musician who was briefly on the board of directors of Roach's organization Diamond Mountain, recalls that Roach invited him to lie down in his and Christie McNally's bed. She then began to massage him from his head down to his penis before finishing with a kiss on the lips. Roach was part of a handful of Western Tibetan Buddhist teachers facing such allegations in the 2000s including Surya Das and Ken McLeod. Some (Note: Based on an interview that NBC had done with unknown witnesses: They said he had been sexually promiscuous while wearing his monk’s robes, therefore embarrassing the traditional Buddhist community. (All Buddhist monks take a vow of celibacy.) I even corresponded off-the-record with a young woman who said she had a sexual relationship with Roach and was now afraid of him. These claims were never proved to be accurate until now.) claimed he had had sexually promiscuous relationships while still donning monk's robes, however until now these claims were never proved to be accurate.

=== Death of Ian Thorson ===
Ian Thorson was a close student of Roach and McNally and served as their attendant after he began attending lectures at Three Jewels Outreach Center in New York City in 1997. In 2000, Thorson's mother hired anti-cult investigators to stage an intervention after her suspicions grew. In 2010, one year after the dissolution of her marriage to Roach, McNally married Thorson. A few weeks later, they entered a three-year retreat at the Diamond Mountain Center; McNally was appointed as the retreat director and guiding teacher. After reports emerged of a series of erratic and even violent episodes between Thorson and McNally, and bizarre behavior by McNally in talks to the community, the Diamond Mountain board of directors asked McNally and her husband to leave the retreat, giving them $3,600 and offering them airfare to any desired destination. Thorson and McNally left the Diamond Mountain property on Monday, February 20, at 5 am and were picked up on a public road according to an email from their assistant to the board of the university. They set up a camp in a cave on Bureau of Land Management property within the retreat boundaries, secretly supplied by a number of retreat participants who felt themselves loyal to the pair. Thorson, aged 38, died in April 2012 of dehydration and exposure while McNally, then 39, would recover from dehydration and exposure. Authorities said that there was no suspected foul play in his death, and that there was no criminal responsibility on behalf of Roach. However, several journalists have claimed that Roach's unorthodox teachings through ACI may caused dangerous outcomes. The whereabouts of McNally have been unknown since this deadly incident.

=== Teachings ===
Roach has fielded critiques of cult like behavior after his many controversies. In an interview with NBC News, Robert Thurman, Columbia University Professor of Buddhism, says Roach's organizations have "a lot of good learning in it". Roach has been uninvited to teach at FPMT centers across the globe in addition to being publicly rebuked by the office of the Dalai Lama. When asked in an interview about his admission of realizing emptiness, Roach says, "if a lot of people thought I was being a bad person or a bad monk or even a corrupt person, that was less important than doing what I felt a divine being wanted me to do, even if everyone thought it was crazy. And I’ve never had a doubt about that. I think that it's more important for me to get enlightened and to follow what I perceive to be direct divine instructions than to be thought of as a bad person."

== Bibliography ==
- The Diamond Cutter: The Buddha on Managing Your Business and Your Life, Three Leaves, 2000. ISBN 0-385-49791-1
- The Essential Yoga Sutra: Ancient Wisdom for Your Yoga, with Christie McNally, Three Leaves, 2005. ISBN 0-385-51536-7
- The Garden: A Parable, Image, 2000. ISBN 0-385-49789-X
- How Yoga Works: Healing Yourself and Others With The Yoga Sutra, with Christie McNally. Diamond Cutter Press, 2005. ISBN 0-9765469-0-6
- The Tibetan Book of Yoga: Ancient Buddhist Teachings on the Philosophy and Practice of Yoga, Doubleday, 2004. ISBN 0-385-50837-9
- China Love You: The Death of Global Competition, Diamond Cutter Press, 2017. ISBN 978-0692794272
- Karmic Management: What Goes Around Comes Around in Your Business and Your Life, Doubleday Publishing, 2009. ISBN 978-0385528740
- The Karma of Love: 100 Answers for Your Relationship, Diamond Cutter Press, 2013. ISBN 978-1937114060
- The 5 Books of the Diamond Cutter Institute Teacher Training Course, Diamond Cutter Institute, 2017. Multiple ISBN's
- The 9 Books of the Diamond Cutter Institute Management Training Course, Diamond Cutter Institute, 2010–2016. Multiple ISBN's
- The Garden: A Parable, Doubleday Publishing, 2000 / 210 pages. ISBN 978-0385497893
- The Eastern Path to Heaven: A Guide to Happiness from the Teachings of Jesus in Tibet, Seabury Books, 2008. ISBN 978-1596270978
- The Logic & Debate Tradition of India, Tibet, & Mongolia (co-translator), MSTP Press, 1979 / 281 pages. ISBN 0918753007
- King of the Dharma: The Illustrated Life of Je Tsongkapa (1357—1419), Diamond Cutter Press, 2008. ISBN 1937114015
- King Udrayana & The Wheel of Life (co-translator), MSTP Press, 1985. ISBN 0918753058
- The Principal Teachings of Buddhism, by Je Tsongkapa (1357—1419) (co-translator), Classics of Middle Asia Series, MSTP Press, 1989. ISBN 978-8120817128
- The 18 Books of the Foundation Course in Buddhism (translator), Asian Classics Institute; 1993–1999. multiple ISBN's
- Preparing for Tantra: The Mountain of Blessings, by Je Tsongkapa (1357—1419) (co-translator), Classics of Middle Asia Series, MSTP Press, 1995. ISBN 9780918753113
- The 18 Books of the Advanced Course in Buddhism (translator), Asian Classics Institute & Diamond Mountain Retreat Center; 2003–2010. multiple ISBNs
