= Diamond Mountain Center =

Tibetan Buddhist seminary and retreat center in Arizona

Coordinates: 32.1557°N 109.4230°W

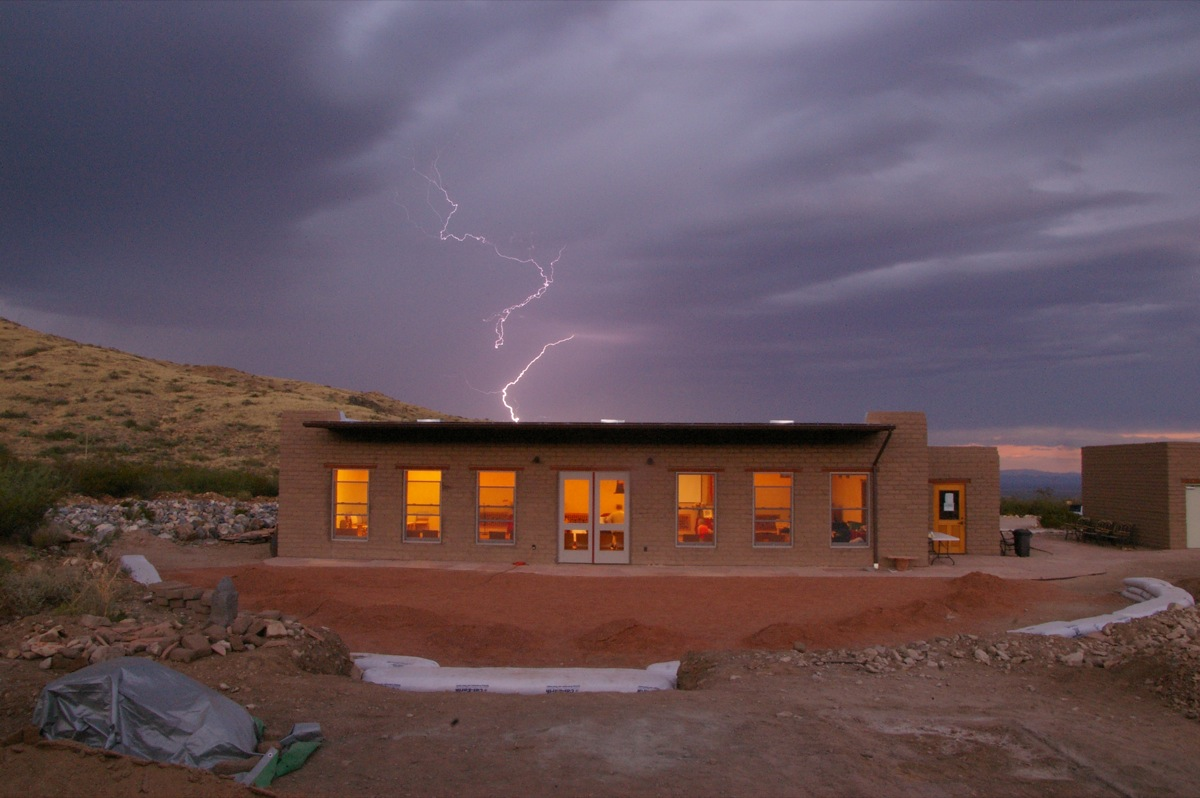
An October storm over the Diamond Mountain temple.

Diamond Mountain is a retreat center located south of Bowie, Arizona in the Chihuahuan Desert. Inspired by the Gelugpa school, it was founded by Michael Roach in 2000 and opened to students in September 2004. It is not an accredited university. The 1,000-acre (4.0 km^{2}) site was purchased in October 2001 and was formerly known as "Bear Springs Ranch".

Diamond Mountain is run by volunteers as a not-for-profit organization and does not charge tuition. Its official mission statement reads:

“Our mission at Diamond Mountain is to provide you with everything you need to lead a wise and good life, and to become nothing less than a being who can go to all worlds and serve all living creatures, all at once. To get you there, we take you through all the traditional training that a monk or yogi would get in a demanding, major monastery in Tibet or ancient India.”

Diamond Mountain holds three five-week academic terms per year on its campus, and additional classes in Tucson, Arizona. Diamond Mountain is affiliated with the Asian Classics Institute.

Diamond Mountain made headlines when a retreat member from Three Jewels Outreach center died in the desert after being expelled from the campus.

== Three year retreat ==
On 30 December 2010, Diamond Mountain commenced a 3-year meditation retreat in which 40 students enrolled. The official retreat leader at that time was Christie McNally, former spiritual partner of Diamond Mountain founder Michael Roach.

In February 2012, while still leading the retreat, McNally confessed how she stabbed her husband Ian Thorson three times. Her confession was seen as a cry for help. Whilst McNally later issued a confusing public statement in which she minimized the event as a "game", the wounds required serious medical attention.

In an inquiry by the Diamond Mountain board, there were allegations of violence and abuse from Thorson toward McNally and others. Refusing to cooperate with Roach or the board, the two were asked to leave Diamond Mountain University and its properties for at least one year. Unknown to the board, the couple retreated to a nearby cave on public land, supported secretly by some followers. In April, Thorson was found dead in the cave after a distressed McNally made a cell phone call for help to Diamond Mountain. McNally was hospitalized and treated for dehydration, the likely cause of Thorson's death (police do not suspect foul play, though an investigation is ongoing.)
