= Dharma talk =

Public discourse on Buddhism by a Buddhist teacher

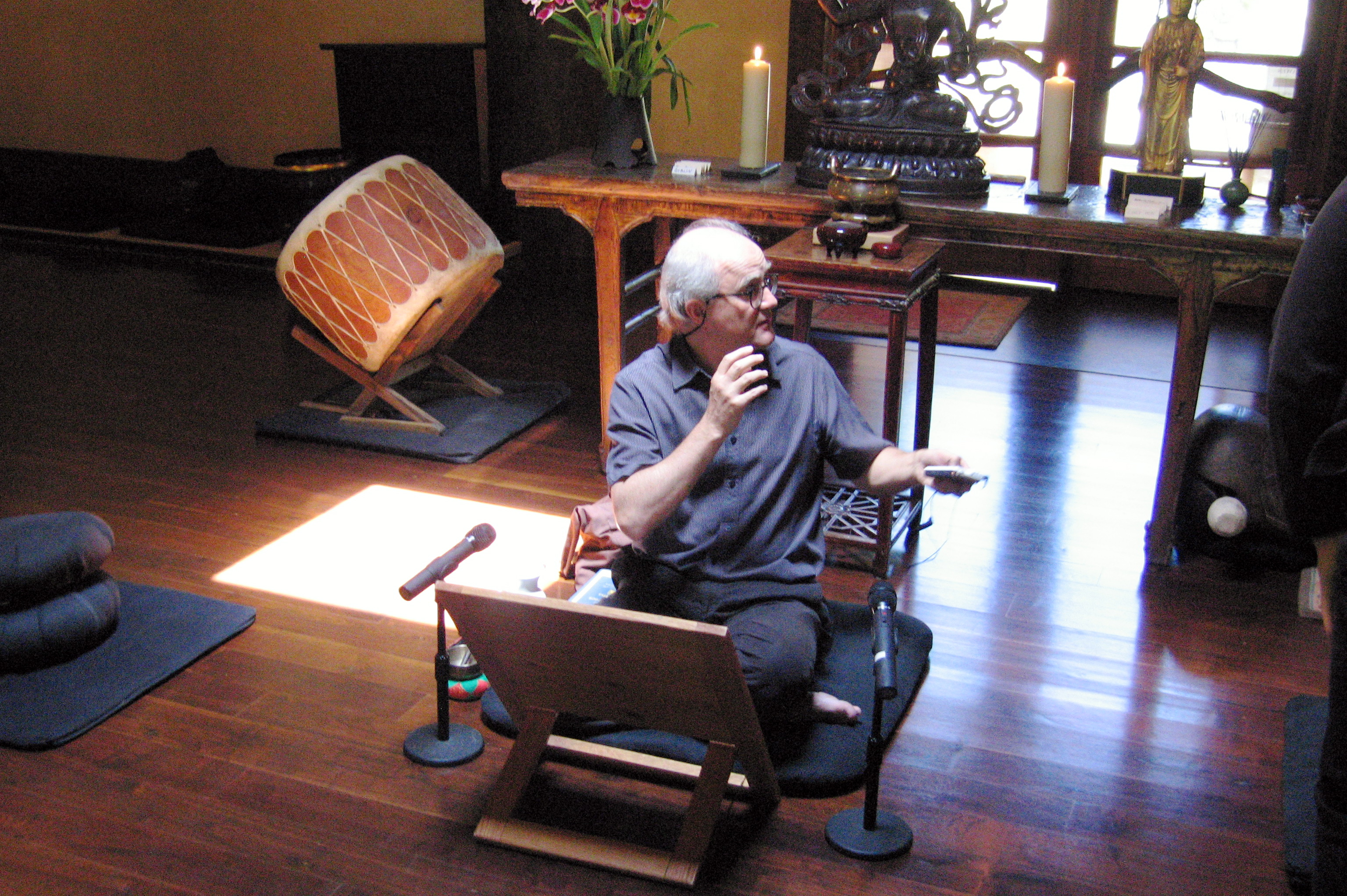
Stephen Batchelor giving a Dharma talk at Upaya Zen Center in Santa Fe, New Mexico

A Dharma talk (Sanskrit) or Dhamma talk (Pali) or Dharma sermon (Japanese: Hōgo (法語), Chinese: 法語) is a public discourse on Buddhism by a Buddhist teacher.

In Theravāda Buddhism, the study of Buddhist texts and listening to Dhamma talks by monks or teachers are common and important practices.

In some Zen traditions a Dharma talk may be referred to as a teisho (提唱). However, according to Taizan Maezumi and Bernard Glassman, a teisho is "a formal commentary by a Zen master on a koan or Zen text. In its strictest sense, teisho is non-dualistic and is thus distinguished from a Dharma talk, which is a lecture on a Buddhist topic." In this sense, a teisho is thus a formal Dharma talk. Vietnamese master Thích Nhất Hạnh says the following about Dharma talks:

A Dharma talk must always be appropriate in two ways: it must accord perfectly with the spirit of the Dharma and it must also respond perfectly to the situation in which it is given. If it only corresponds perfectly with the teachings but does not meet the needs of the listeners, it's not a good Dharma talk; it's not appropriate.
