= Jan Chozen Bays =

American Buddhist abess

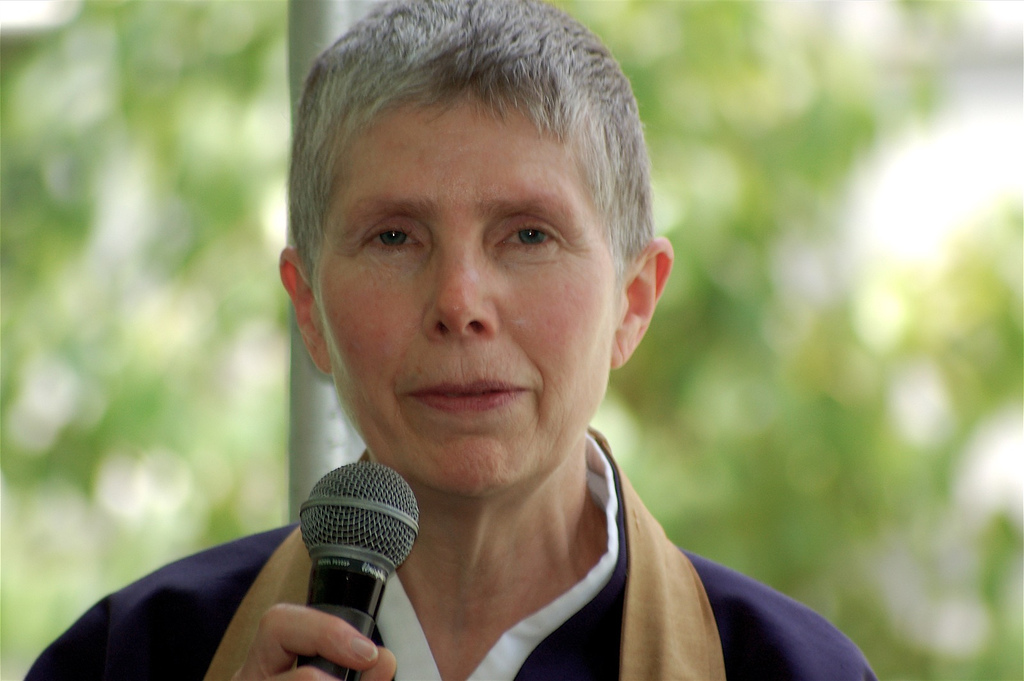
- Title: Roshi

Personal life
- Born: August 9, 1945 (age 81) Chicago, Illinois, U.S.
- Spouse: Hogen Bays
- Education: M.D. University of California at San Diego
- Website: Great Vow Zen Monastery Heart of Wisdom Zen Temple; Zen Community of Oregon

Religious life
- Religion: Zen Buddhism
- School: Harada-Yasutani
- Lineage: White Plum Asanga
- Dharma name: Chozen

Senior posting
- Based in: Oregon, USA
- Predecessor: Taizan Maezumi

Jan Chozen Bays (born August 9, 1945), is a Zen teacher, author, mindful eating educator, and pediatrician specializing in work with abused children.

== Biography ==
Jan Chozen Bays was born in Chicago, Illinois on August 9, 1945. She grew up in East Greenbush, New York and spent two years in Korea. She received her undergraduate degree at Swarthmore College and earned her medical degree at the University of California at San Diego, specializing in pediatrics.

Bays began practicing Zen in a group that included Charlotte Joko Beck, Anne Seisen Saunders, and Jerry Shishin Wick in San Diego. She eventually moved to the Zen Center of Los Angeles to study with the Japanese Zen teacher Taizan Maezumi Roshi. She had an extramarital affair with him, which she admitted, which devastated his wife and children. She served as the physician at the Zen Center’s community medical clinic. She was a student of Maezumi from 1977 until his death in 1995. She received dharma transmission from him in 1983 becoming his 4th dharma heir and, after Joko Beck, the second woman.

With her husband Laren Hogen Bays, since 1985 she has been a teacher at the Zen Community of Oregon, a Zen center or sangha in Portland, Oregon. Chozen and Hogen Bays are also co-founders and co-abbots of Great Vow Zen Monastery of Clatskanie, Oregon, which opened in 2002. From 1990 until the present she has trained with Shodo Harada, a Rinzai Zen teacher. In 2011, Bays founded Heart of Wisdom Zen Temple in Portland, Oregon.

== Child abuse expert ==
Bays is a pediatrician and nationally recognized expert on child abuse. In the 1980s and 1990s, she conducted the medical examinations of thousands of infants and children who had been abused or killed and regularly appeared in court as an expert witness. In 1987, she helped to found Child Abuse Response and Evaluation Services (CARES) Northwest, now one of the oldest and largest child abuse assessment centers in the United States.

== Bibliography ==
- Bays, Jan Chozen (2003). Jizo Bodhisattva: Guardian of Children, Travelers, and Other Voyagers. Shambhala Publications. ISBN 978-1590300800
- Bays, Jan Chozen (2009). Mindful Eating: A Guide to Rediscovering a Healthy and Joyful Relationship with Food. Shambhala Publications. ISBN 978-1590305317.
- Bays, Jan Chozen (2011). How to Train a Wild Elephant & Other Adventures in Mindfulness. Shambhala Publications. ISBN 978-1590308172.
- Bays, Jan Chozen (2014). Mindfulness on the Go: Simple Meditation Practices You Can Do Anywhere. Shambhala Publications. ISBN 978-1611801705.
- Bays, Jan Chozen (2016). The Vow-Powered Life: A Simple Method for Living with Purpose. Shambhala Publications. ISBN 978-1611801002.
- Bays MD, Jan Chozen (2022). Mindful Medicine: 40 Simple Practices to Help Healthcare Professionals Heal Burnout and Reconnect to Purpose. Shambhala Publications. ISBN 9781645470526.

== Gallery ==
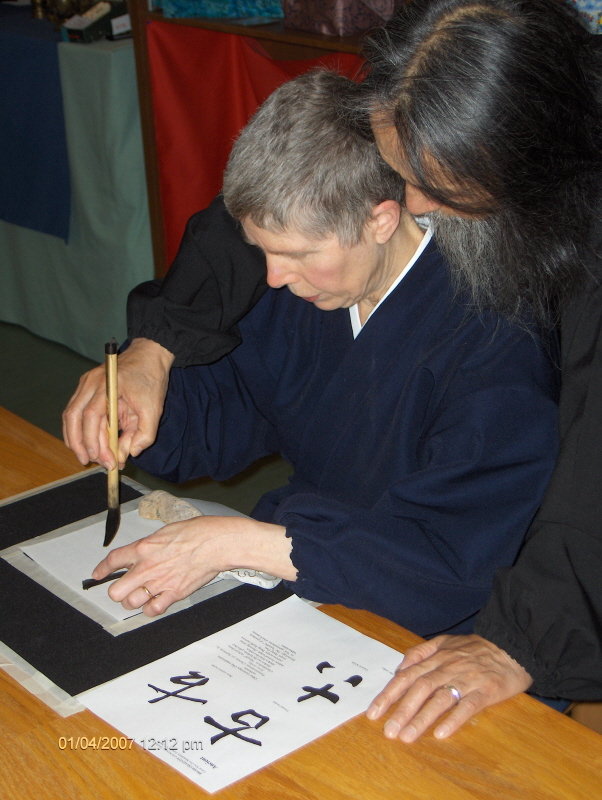
with Kaz Tanahashi

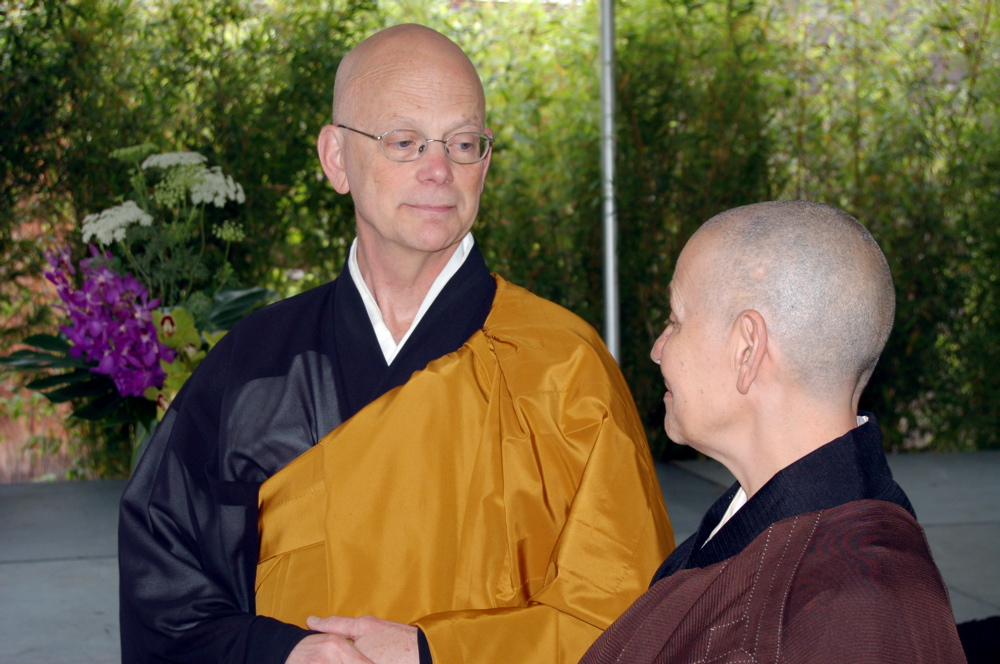
husband Hogen Bays

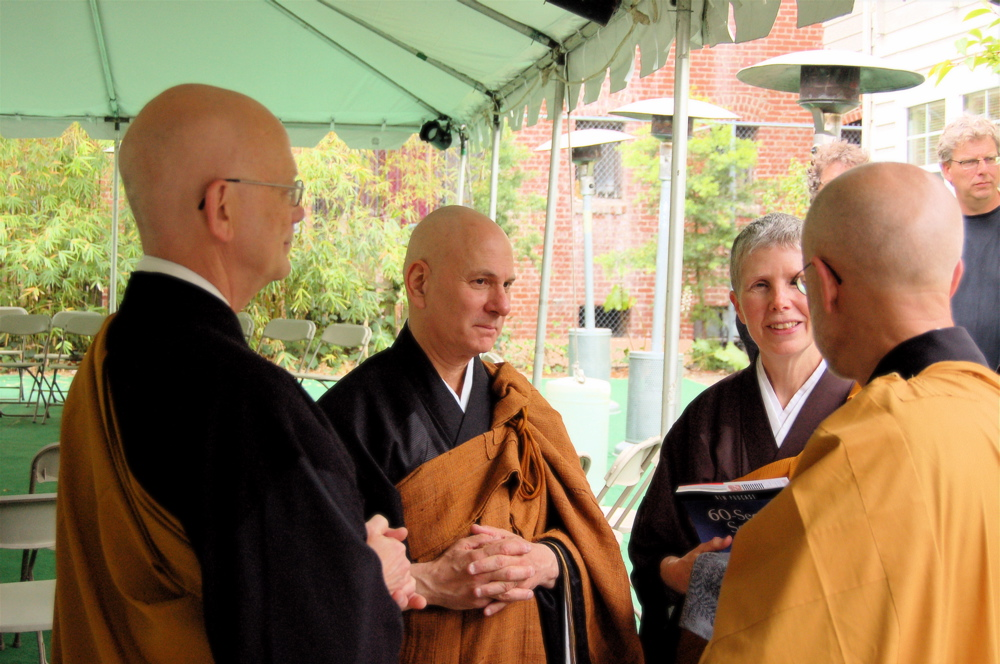
Hogen, Paul Genki Kahn, and Chozen

== See also ==
- Timeline of Zen Buddhism in the United States
