= Ordinary Mind Zen School =

Independent Zen Buddhist centers

Religion
- Affiliation: Zen

Architecture
- Founder: Charlotte Joko Beck, Elizabeth Hamilton, Diane Eshin Rizzetto, Elihu Genmyo Smith
- Completed: 1995

The Ordinary Mind Zen School is a network of independent Zen centers established by Charlotte Joko Beck and her Dharma Successors in 1995.

== History ==
The school is unaffiliated with any Zen centers which fall outside of its own network, however many Ordinary Mind Zen teachers are members of the White Plum Asanga. The history of the Ordinary Mind Zen School dates back to 1983, which was the year that Joko Beck had left the Zen Center of Los Angeles. That was the year her teacher, Hakuyu Taizan Maezumi, had been confronted by his students about his alcoholism and sexual liaisons with some female students. Joko Beck established the Zen Center of San Diego in 1983.

According to Richard Hughes Seager, "By 1998, the Ordinary Mind School had centers in San Diego, Champaign, Illinois, Oakland, California, Portland, Oregon and New York City." There is no one set structure of curriculum in the Ordinary Mind School, as the Dharma Successors of Joko Beck get to decide their method of training independent of any organizational head. Long before retirement, Joko Beck had done away with all titles and no longer wore her okesa. (For formal occasions she often wore a rakusu after ceasing to wear okesa; she also ordained several Zen priests throughout her life.) She had distanced herself considerably from her roots in the Sōtō school, and much of the ceremony had been abandoned in favor of pure meditation practice.

== Teachers ==
- Ordained by Joko Beck:
  - Larry Jissan Christensen
  - Anna Christensen
  - Geoff Dawson (Ordinary Mind Zen School Sydney)
  - Gregg Howard (Ordinary Mind Zen Brisbane)
  - Barry Magid (Ordinary Mind Zendo)
  - Gary Nafstad
  - Barbara Muso Penn
  - Elihu Genmyo Smith (Prairie Zen Center)
  - Diane Eshin Rizzetto (Bay Zen Center)
  - Ezra Bayda
  - Elizabeth Hamilton
- Claire Slemmer
- Marc Poirier
- Dan Myoen Birnbaum (Bay Zen Center)
- Pat Jikyo George (Zen Center of Philadelphia)
- Peter Nichols (Zen Center of Philadelphia)
- Bob Koller (Zen Center of Philadelphia)
- Malcolm Martin (Ordinary Mind UK)
- Andrew Sono Tootell (OzZEN Ordinary Mind Zen)
- Karen Terzano (OMZ Europe)
- Jani Henttonen (OMZ Europe)
- Timo Teräväinen (OMZ Europe)
- Magnus Norén (OMZ Europe)
- Brenda Chiko Hess (Prescott Zen Center)
- Diane Moore (Santa Rosa Zen Group)
- Bernie Rhie (Williamstown Zen Group)
- Robert Rosenbaum
- Ed Mushin Russell (Prairie Zen Center)
- Al Zolynas (Freeway Zen Group)
- Spencer McWilliams (Freeway Zen Group)
- Vince Jensen (Ordinary Mind Zen Brisbane)
- Jack Zenko Wicks (Friendly Zen OzZEN Brisbane)
- Louise Shinsho Cranny (OzZEN Ordinary Mind Zen)

Note that Joko wrote a letter saying that she revoked transmission for two teachers she gave transmission to: Ezra Bayda and Elizabeth Hamilton. However it is unclear if Joko or anyone had the authority to revoke transmission.

== See also ==
- Buddhism in the United States
- Timeline of Zen Buddhism in the United States
