= Barry Magid =

American psychoanalyst and Zen teacher

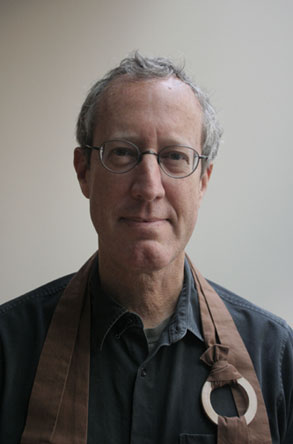

Barry Magid is a psychoanalyst and Zen teacher whose life and work have been on the forefront of a movement to integrate Western psychology with Eastern spiritual practices. He teaches at the Ordinary Mind Zendo in New York City. OMZ is part of the Ordinary Mind Zen School, a network of independent Zen centers established by Charlotte Joko Beck and her Dharma Successors in 1995.

== Background ==
After graduating from the University of Medicine and Dentistry of New Jersey in 1975, he completed his training in psychiatry and psychoanalysis in New York City at Roosevelt Hospital and The Postgraduate Center for Mental Health, where he became a training and supervising analyst. His primary psychoanalytic orientation was Self Psychology, the school founded by Heinz Kohut. In 1993 he edited Freud's Case Studies: Self Psychological Perspectives. He has also served on the board of The International Association for Relational Psychoanalysis and Psychotherapy (IARPP).

While he was training as a psychoanalyst, he also began Zen training, first under Eido Tai Shimano and later with Tetsugen Bernard Glassman. Later he met and trained with Charlotte Joko Beck, the Dharma heir of Taizan Maezumi and founder of her own Ordinary Mind School of Zen. In 1996, Joko Beck gave him permission to establish The Ordinary Mind Zendo, where he became the founding teacher and in 1998, he received Dharma transmission, which gave him full authorization to teach Zen independently. In 2009, he named his first Dharma successor, Pat George, who teaches at The Zen Center of Philadelphia. In November 2014, he named his second Dharma Heir, Karen Terzano, in a ceremony attended by members of both his New York sangha and her Finland sangha where she is currently the founding teacher.

Magid has published numerous articles and three books on the integration of psychoanalysis and Zen: Ordinary Mind: Exploring the Common Ground of Zen and Psychoanalysis (2002), Ending the Pursuit of Happiness (2008), and Nothing Is Hidden: The Psychology of Zen Koans (2013).

In addition, for many years he pursued the craft of letterpress printing, and published limited editions of handset and handprinted books under his own imprint, Dim Gray Bar Press. Among the titles he published was a volume of the collected letters of William Carlos Williams and Charles Tomlinson (1992) which he co-edited with Hugh Witemeyer. He also edited Father Louie: Photographs of Thomas Merton by Ralph Eugene Meatyard (1991). Authors published by the press include Wendell Berry, Guy Davenport, Jim Harrison, Thomas Merton and Jonathan Williams.

He lives in New York City with his son Sam and his partner, Jessica Benjamin.

== Bibliography ==
- Magid, B.; Witemeyer, H., eds. (1991). The Letters of William Carlos Williams and Charles Tomlinson. Dim Gray Bar Press.
- Meatyard, Ralph Eugene (1992). Magid, B. (ed.). Father Louie: Photographs of Thomas Merton. Timken.
- Magid, B. (2002). Freud's Case Studies: Self-Psychological Perspectives. Analytic Press.
- Magid, B. (2002). Ordinary Mind:Exploring the Common Ground of Zen and Psychoanalysis. Wisdom.
- Magid, B (2008). Ending the Pursuit of Happiness: A Zen Guide. Wisdom.
- Magid, B (2013). Nothing is Hidden: The Psychology of Zen Koans. Wisdom.
