= Merle Kodo Boyd =

American Buddhist monk (1944–2022)

Roshi Merle Kodo Boyd
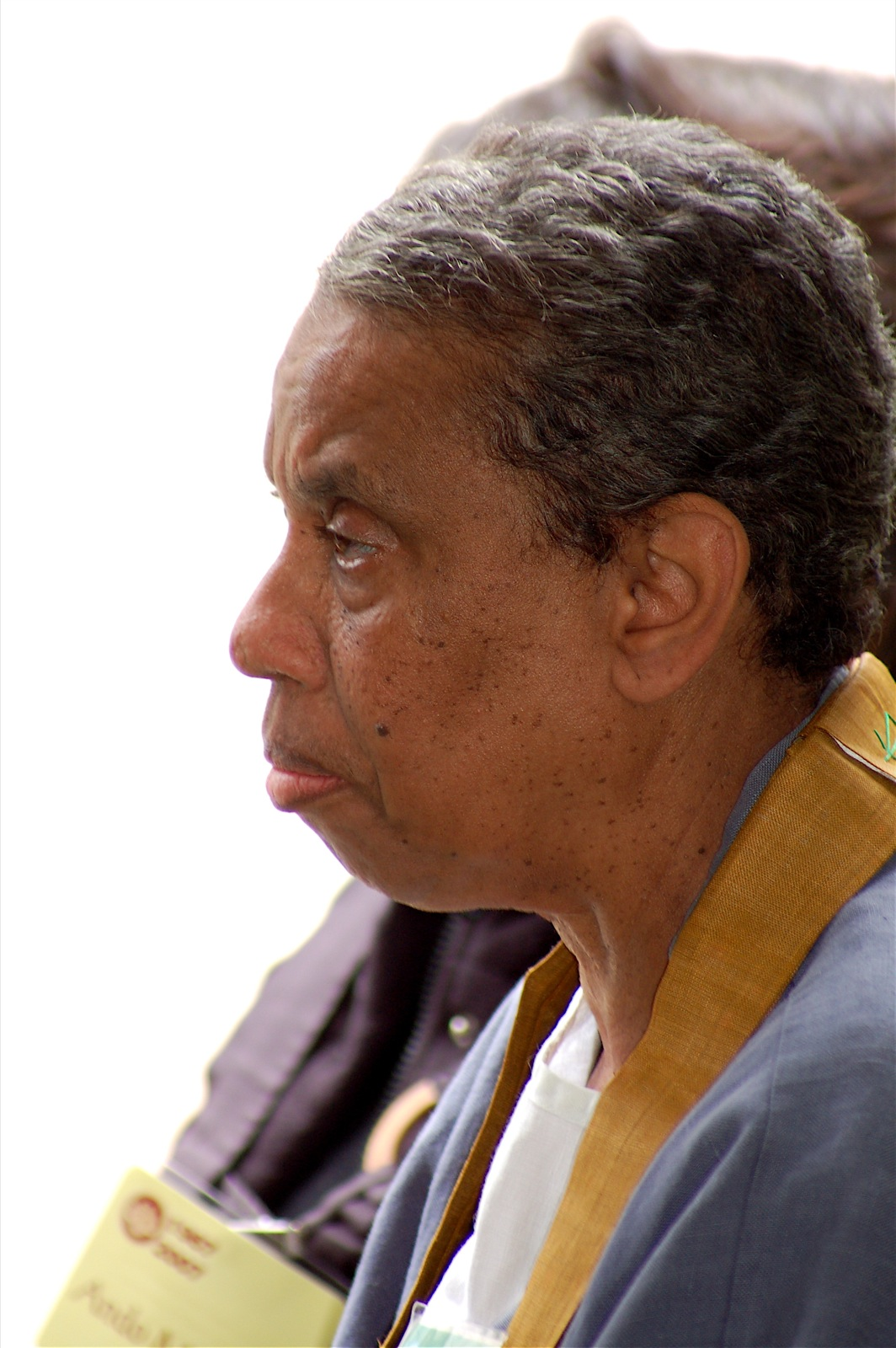

Personal life
- Born: December 23, 1944 Prairie View, Texas, U.S.
- Died: February 20, 2022 (aged 77) Durham, North Carolina, U.S.
- Children: One daughter

Religious life
- Religion: Zen
- School: Zen Peacemaker Circle
- Lineage: White Plum Asanga

Senior posting
- Based in: Lincroft Zen Sangha
- Predecessor: Wendy Egyoku Nakao
- Website: www.lincroftzen.org

Merle Kodo Boyd (December 23, 1944 – February 20, 2022) was an American Zen Buddhist nun. She was the first African-American woman to receive Dharma transmission in Zen Buddhism, as a Dharma heir of Wendy Egyoku Nakao in the White Plum Asanga. Receiving transmission in March 2006, she founded and led the Lincroft Zen Sangha in New Jersey that is currently part of the Zen Peacemaker Circle established by Tetsugen Bernard Glassman and his wife Sandra Jishu Holmes.

== Early life and education ==
Boyd was born in Prairie View, Texas on December 23, 1944, during the era of segregation. Growing up in Houston, her family, like most other African-American families of this period, suffered the pain and hardship of racial discrimination. Her father was a sociology professor at a historically black college, and her family attended a black congregational church.

Boyd first developed an interest in Zen Buddhism after viewing a 12th-century Chinese painting titled Solitary Angler in a book, depicting an angler fishing upon a wide-open sea. Boyd wrote, "The painting called to me in my own voice. I immediately sought out more books and found instructions for sitting zazen. Using a bed pillow and blankets, I began the practice alone in a corner of my bedroom."

Boyd practiced in this way for a couple of years, reading books and practicing zazen in her bedroom. While she often contemplated going to a Zen center, she was also wary of potential racial tension she imagined she would face were she to do so. She commented, "I knew no black people practicing Zen. The thought of entering a zendo knowing nothing of the etiquette and ritual was frightening enough. Being the only black person there would, I felt, draw more attention than I could stand. But the pull of practice was strong and, finally, I ventured out."

Boyd earned her bachelor's degree in Maine. She then earned two master's degrees: one in early childhood education from New York University, and the other in social work from Hunter College.

== Career ==
Boyd worked as a clinical social worker and therapist in Middletown, New Jersey, primarily with Vietnam War veterans.

In the 1980s, Boyd began sitting with a small group led by a teacher named Sr. Janet Richardson, a Dharma heir of Robert Jinsen Kennedy and Tetsugen Bernard Glassman. According to the Lincroft website, "She received Jukai in 1994 and Priest Ordination in 1996 from Roshi Sandra Jishu Holmes. After Roshi Jishu's death, Kodo continued her practice with Roshi Wendy Egyoku Nakao, from whom she received Preceptor Transmission in 2002 and Dharma Transmission in March 2006.

In 1994, Boyd and two other practitioners, Bill Nordahl and Peter Nyodo Ott, founded the Lincroft Zen Sangha in Lincroft, New Jersey. The sangha initially grew out of the Zen Mountain Monastery.

In a 2013 interview with Tricycle: The Buddhist Review, Boyd articulated the connection between her racial and spiritual identities, saying, "I've always felt that there's a connection between my being black and my being a Zen practitioner."

== Death ==
Boyd died in Durham, North Carolina, on February 20, 2022, at the age of 77. She was survived by her husband, daughter, and community of friends.

== See also ==
- Buddhism in the United States
- Timeline of Zen Buddhism in the United States
