= Diane Eshin Rizzetto =

American Zen teacher

- Title: Zen teacher

Personal life
- Born: United States

Religious life
- Religion: Zen Buddhism
- School: Ordinary Mind School

Senior posting
- Predecessor: Joko Beck

Diane Eshin Rizzetto is an American Zen teacher in the lineage of Joko Beck, and the author of the books Waking up to What You Do and Deep Hope.

In 1994, Rizzetto received dharma transmission from Joko Beck. She then established and began teaching at Bay Zen Center in Oakland, CA. She retired from her role as teacher at Bay Zen Center in 2019.

Some American Zen centers use her book Waking up to What You Do as part of their curriculum when teaching the precepts in preparation for Jukai.

== See also ==
- Timeline of Zen Buddhism in the United States
