= Wendy Egyoku Nakao =

American zen teacher

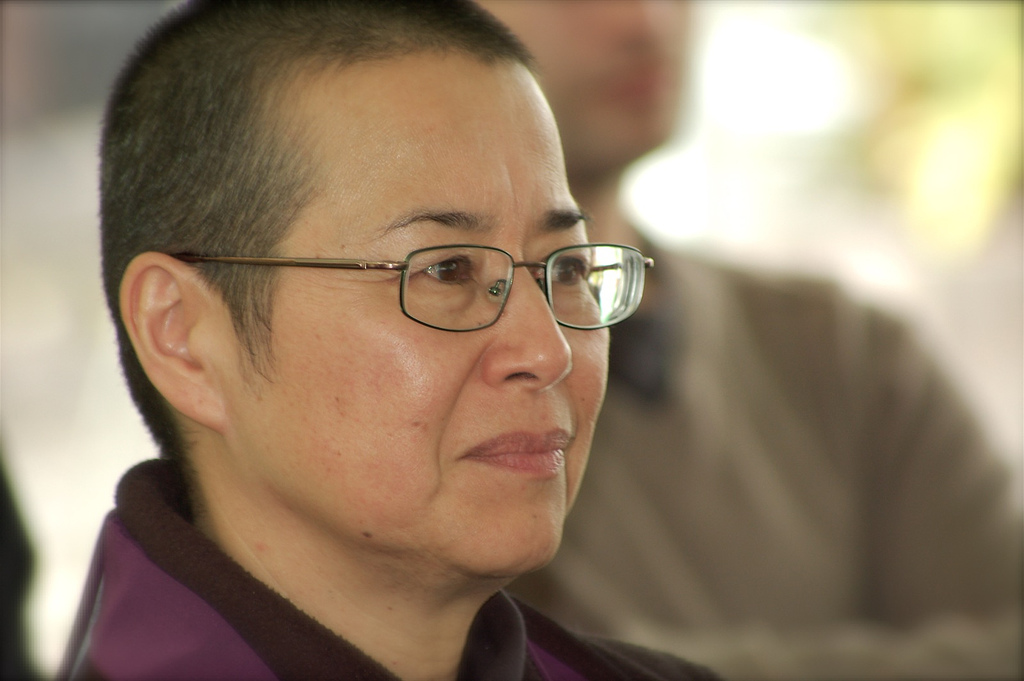
- Title: Roshi

Personal life
- Born: Hawaii

Religious life
- Religion: Zen Buddhism
- School: Harada-Yasutani
- Lineage: White Plum Asanga

Senior posting
- Based in: Zen Center of Los Angeles
- Predecessor: Bernard Glassman
- Successor: Merle Kodo Boyd
- Website: www.zencenter.org/

Wendy Egyoku Nakao Rōshi is the abbot emerita and head teacher of the Zen Center of Los Angeles. She moved into the center in 1978 and later received Dharma transmission and inka from Bernard Glassman. She assumed her abbotship in 1999. According to James Ishmael Ford, "Under her leadership, the center expanded its mission to be family-friendly and socially active, creating an important experiment in the development of Western Zen." Nakao also conferred Dharma transmission to the first ever African-American woman, Merle Kodo Boyd. Nakao is a member of the American Zen Teachers Association. In May 2019 Egyoku Nakao stepped down as abbot, but remains its head teacher, to devote herself to further developing ZCLA's teaching curriculum. She at that time installed Deborah Faith-Mind Thoresen as the ZCLA's fourth abbot. Her book of modern koans, co-written with rōshi Eve Marko, was published in 2020.

== Bibliography ==
- Eve Myonen Marko; Wendy Egyoku Nakao (2020). The Book of Householder Koans: Waking Up in the Land of Attachments. Monkfish Book Publishing Company. ISBN 978-1-948626-08-8.

== Gallery ==
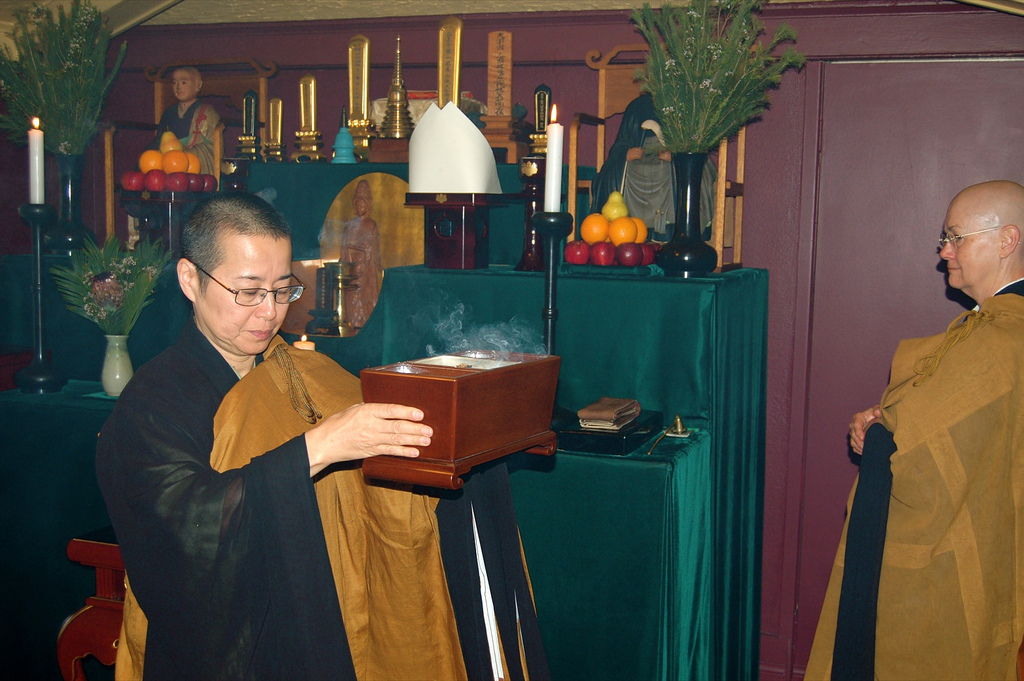
with Pat Enkyo O'Hara
