= Zen center =

A Zen Center

The phrase Zen center was coined by American students of Shunryu Suzuki in the mid-twentieth century, and the San Francisco Zen Center became the first Zen center, incorporating in 1962. Neither temples nor monasteries (although at times operating such facilities), Zen centers occupy a unique place in the historical development of Zen Buddhism and of Buddhism in the United States.

As Zen practice has expanded throughout the United States over the last fifty years, the variety of Zen centers has increased. While some are now the homes of wealthy communities in major cities (such as Zen Center of Los Angeles), and some are in traditional mountain settings (such as Yokoji Zen Mountain Center or Centro Zen in Puerto Rico), other Zen centers have either humble or no permanent physical location - meeting in members' private homes, university classrooms, and Quaker Meeting Houses to name but a few examples. While large and established Zen centers may serve as the residence of priests, monks, and lay people, smaller and more rural Zen centers may have no ordained members. Although some recent studies have been made regarding Zen in America, the area remains under researched, and still quite heterogeneous.

== Architecture ==
While the exteriors of the centers frequently fit in with the areas they inhabit the interiors tend to have Asian influences. While not required, most Zen centers have a zendo or meditation hall. Zen centers may have residents, also known as monks (for males) and nuns (female), who may live in the center's residence area. Most have kitchens and communal areas.

Some centers do not have mirrors in the bathrooms. This is to assist the practitioner from focusing on unimportant parts of zen practice, such as facial appearance.

== Zen center resident life ==
Life as a resident is different from lay life (also known as householder). Residential rooms and common areas lack televisions and other common modern pastimes. Access to many creature comforts are reduced. Residents are required to perform daily chores. Times for zazen (zen sitting meditation) and other aspects of practice are built into the daily schedule. Superfluous talking is discouraged; instead a resident should be practicing mindfulness in all they do.

== Etiquette ==
As in Asian cultures, shoes are not worn in most areas of a zen center.

Members of Zen centers have access to areas outside of public areas. It is not considered polite to wander around the Zen center unescorted. At most centers, the abbot or Roshi is available by appointment only. A level of respect must always be observed with regard to all things in the center from the Roshi to the kitchen.

When entering the Zendo, bow towards the Buddha with hands held in Gassho. If anyone is sitting in the Zendo all effort to remain quiet must be observed.

== Donations ==
Most centers rely on donations from private individuals.

== Community involvement ==
Many centers are located in urban areas. In an effort to increase acceptance, centers often have community programs designed to be beneficial to the community as a whole. This is also a tenet of Buddhism.

== Gallery ==
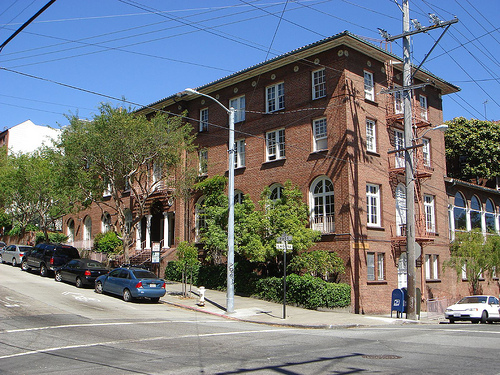
San Francisco Zen Center

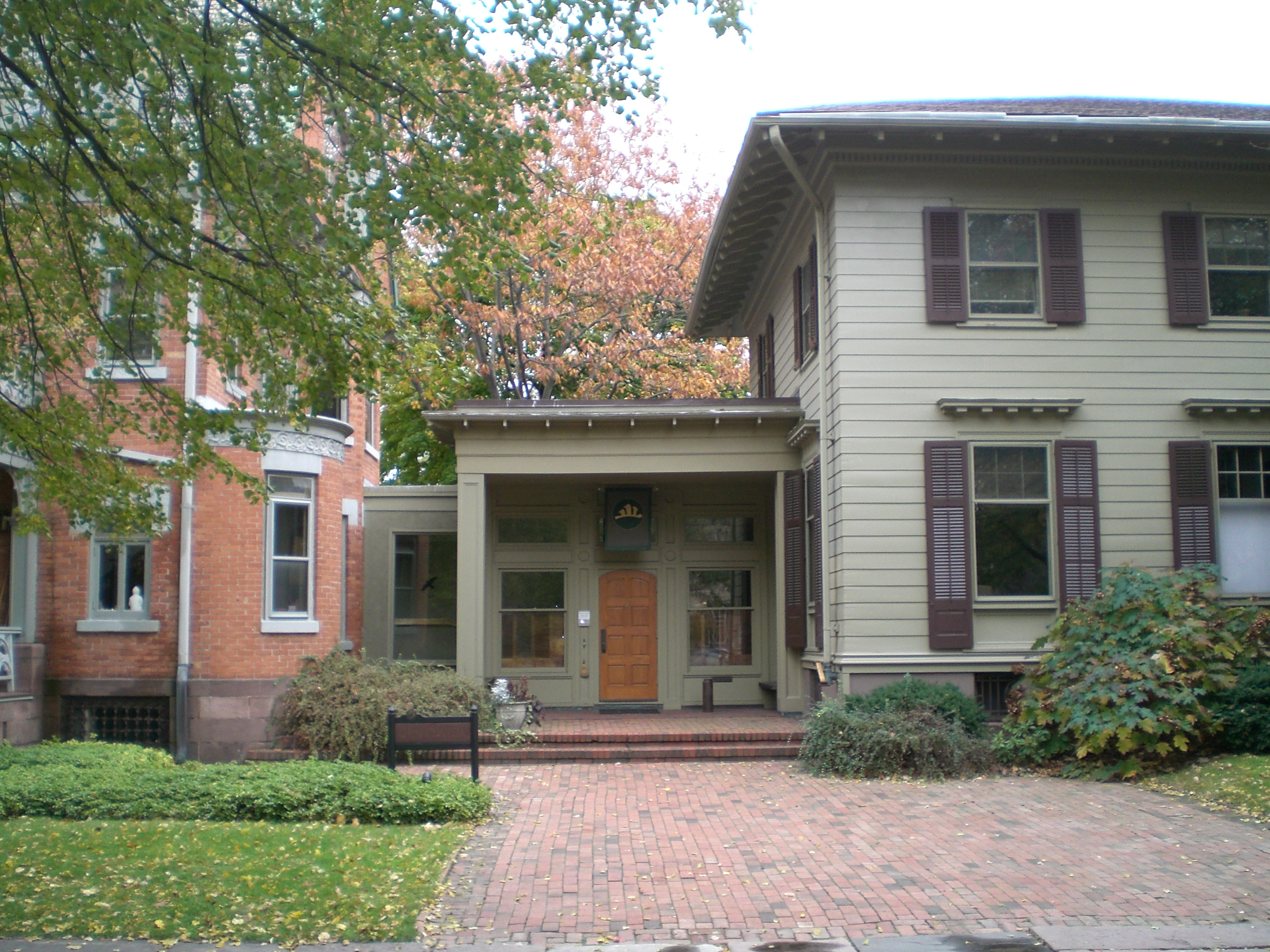
Rochester Zen Center front entrance

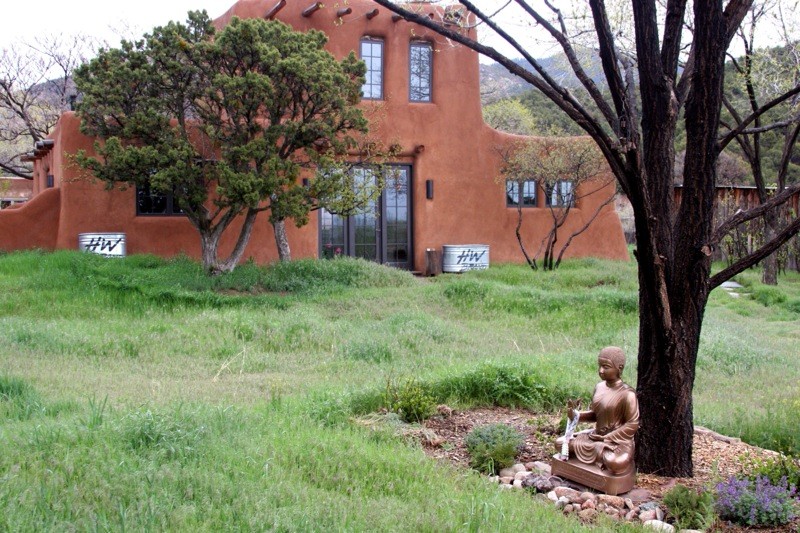
Upaya Zen Center - New Mexico

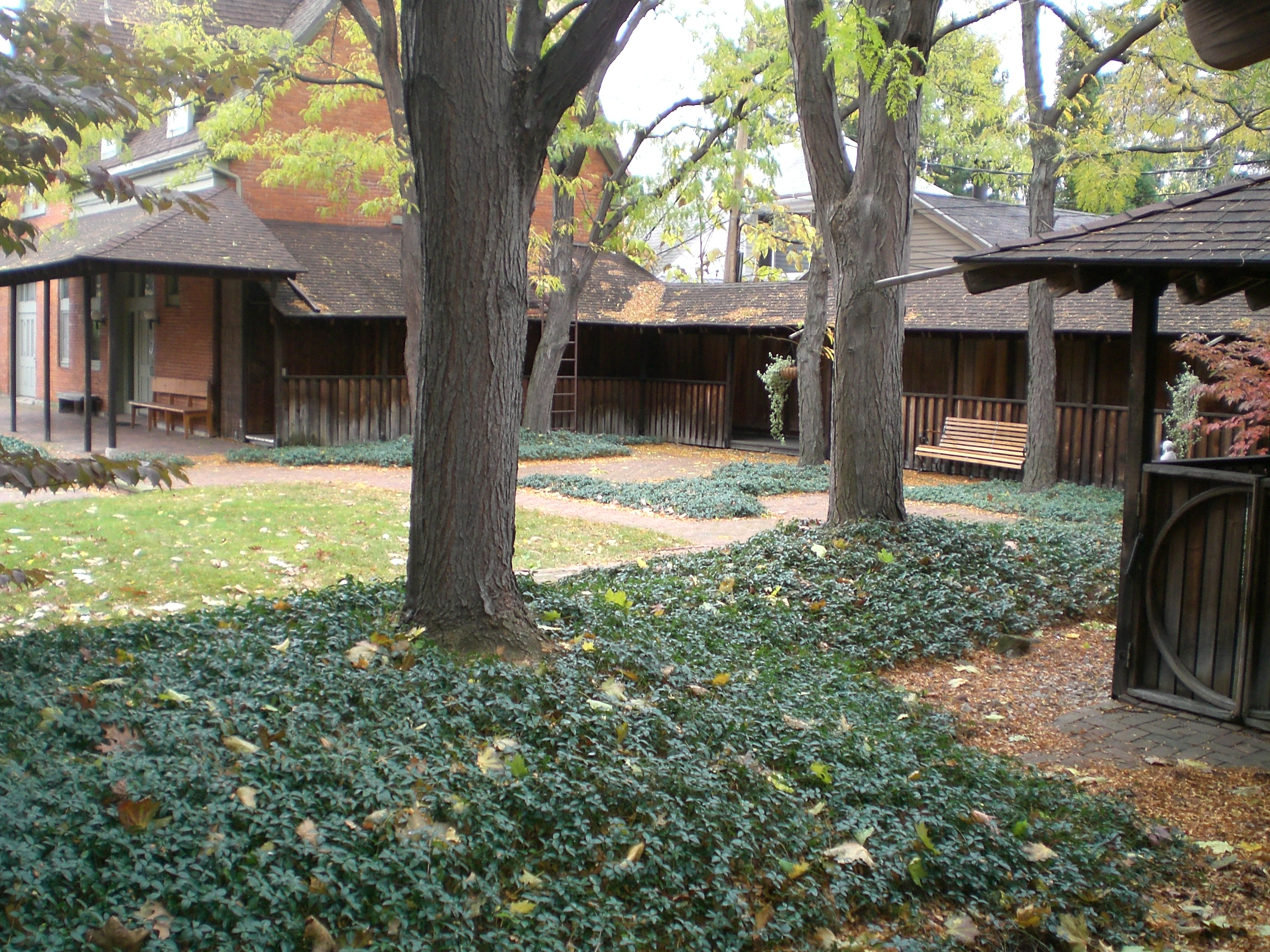
Rochester Zen Center Garden and Buddha Hall.

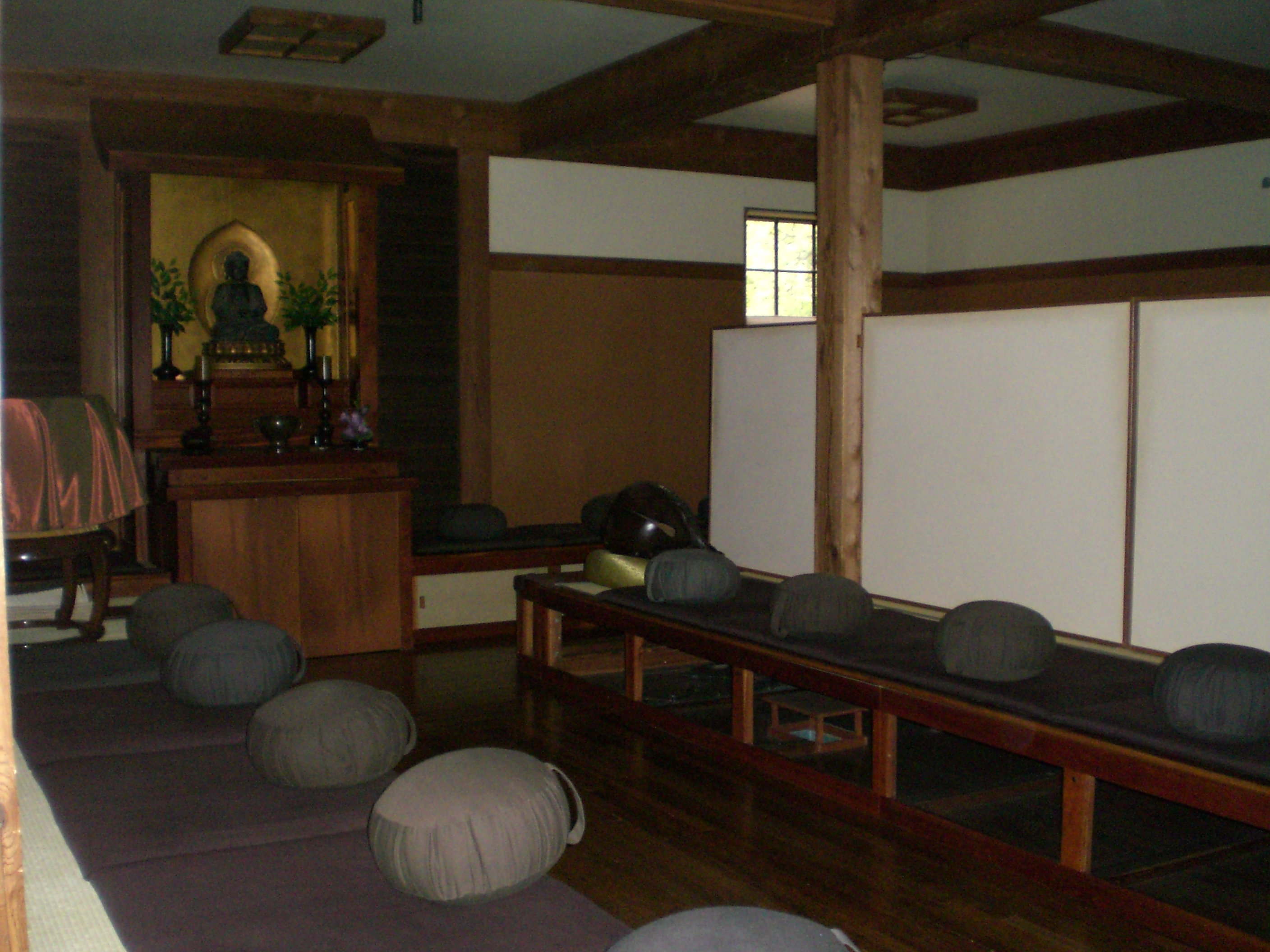
RZC Zendo

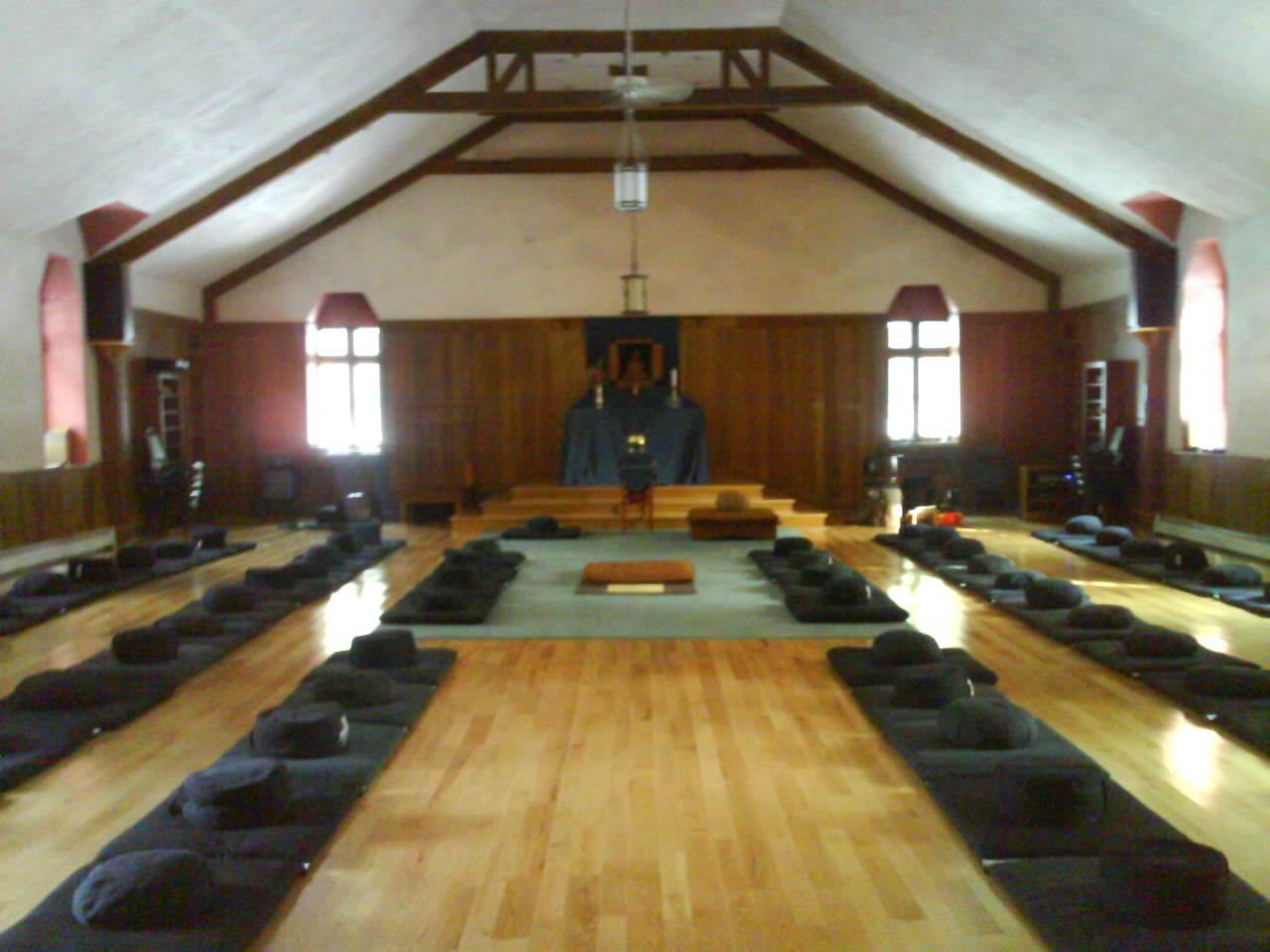
Zen Mountain Monastery in Mt. Tremper, NY

== See also ==
- Dharma centre
- American Zen Teachers Association
- Timeline of Zen Buddhism in the United States
