= Charles Tenshin Fletcher =

English-American Zen teacher

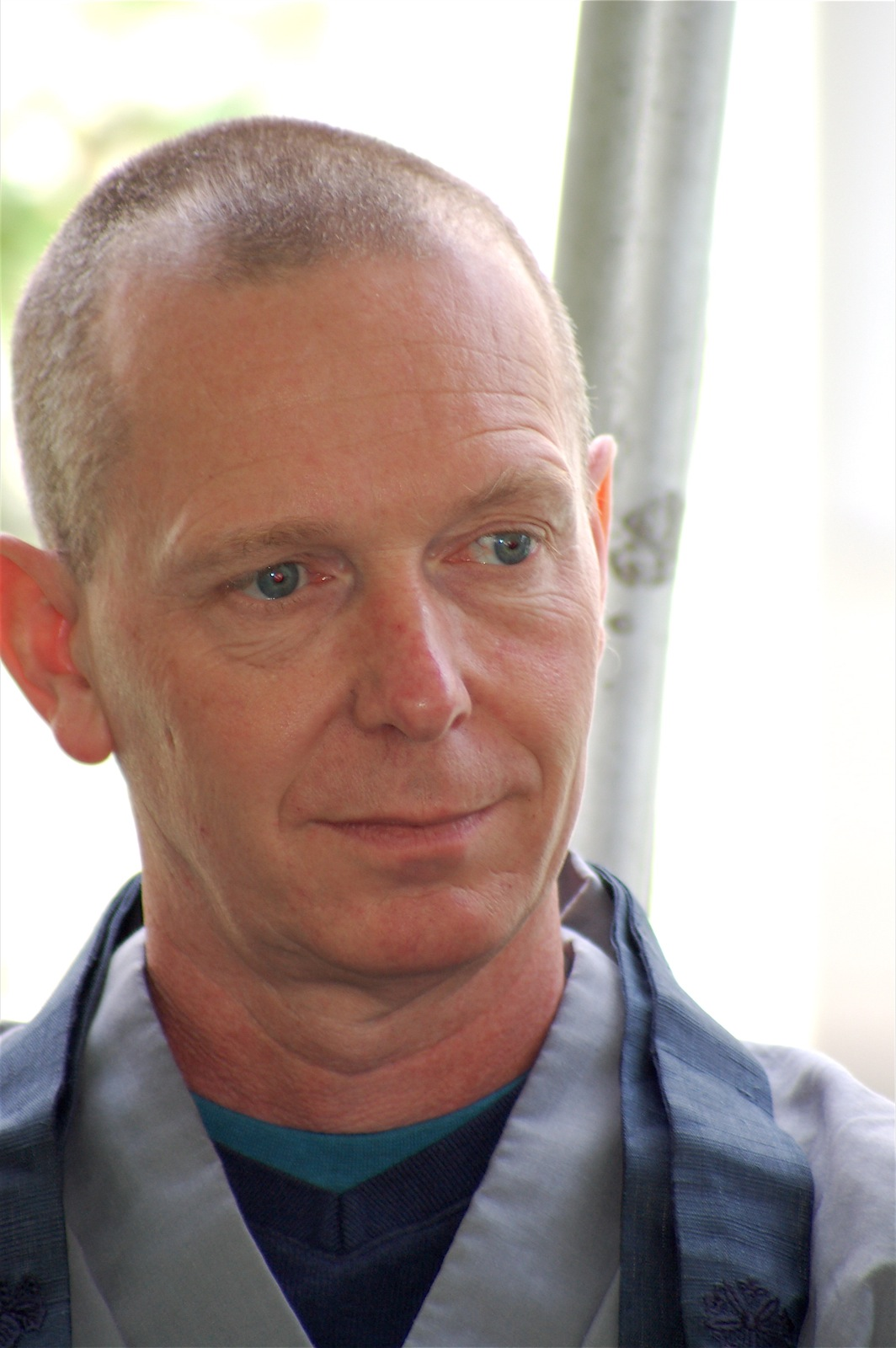
- Title: Rōshi

Personal life
- Born: Charles Fletcher Manchester, England
- Citizenship: American
- Occupation: Abbot
- Website: https://www.home-zen.com/ https://zmc.org/

Religious life
- Religion: Zen Buddhism
- School: Harada-Yasutani
- Lineage: White Plum Asanga

Senior posting
- Based in: Yokoji Zen Mountain Center
- Predecessor: Taizan Maezumi
- Successor: Philip Shinko Squire; Barry Kaigen McMahon; David Keizan Scott; David Jokai Blackwell; Tom Chigen Bartholomew; Jim Yugen Lakey; Craig Eishu Twentyman; Gavin Mokuin Strathie; Arthur Wayu Kennedy

Charles Tenshin Fletcher is an English-American Zen teacher.

== Early life and education ==
Born in Manchester, England, he moved to the United States in 1979 to study at the Zen Center of Los Angeles with founder Taizan Maezumi Rōshi, for whom he served as jisha (personal attendant).

== Career ==
In 1994, he received Dharma transmission (authorization to teach) in the White Plum lineage from Taizan Maezumi Rōshi. He acted as administrator for many years at Zen Center of Los Angeles, and then was made abbot of Yokoji Zen Mountain Center in 1995 after the death of Taizan Maezumi Rōshi on May 15, 1995.

Charles Tenshin Fletcher Rōshi continues as the abbot at Yokoji Zen Mountain Center, in the San Jacinto Mountains, near Idyllwild, California. He is certified as a Kokusai Fukyōshi ("Official Foreign Representative") by Sōtō-shū Shûmusôchô, that is, the Japanese Sōtō Zen sect.

Tenshin Rōshi has trained thoroughly in kōan and shikantaza as well as other more recently developed forms of practice. In addition to his work in the US, he returns to the UK annually to lead a sesshin near Liverpool.

== Publications ==
- Tenshin Rōshi co-authored Way of ZEN with David Shoji Scott (2001) ISBN 0-312-20620-8

== See also ==
- Timeline of Zen Buddhism in the United States
