= Koryū Osaka =

Japanese Zen Buddhist teacher

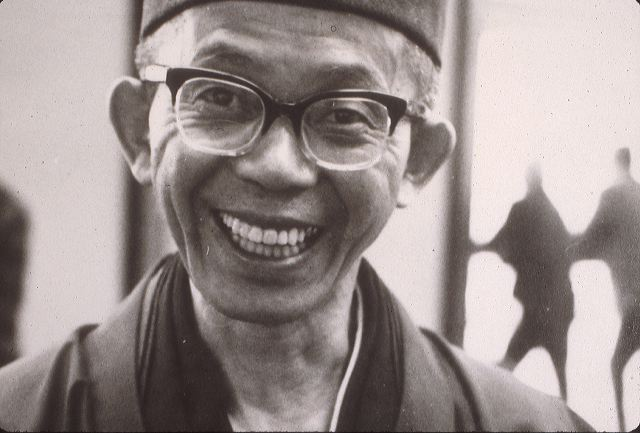
Koryu Osaka

Koryū Osaka (1901–1985), (Note: Hazy Moon Zen Centre, Teachers) birthname Koryū Matsumoto, was a Japanese lay Zen-teacher who taught Taizan Maezumi the Inzan koan-curriculum. (Note: Barry Kaigen McMahon, The Evolution of the White Plum. A short and incomplete history of its founders and their practice)

== Biography ==
Musa Koryū Osaka (無作光龍苧坂) was born in 1901 as Koryū Matsumoto, but received the name Osaka when he was adopted into a family without a son. He attended Tokyo University, graduating with a major in Indian philosophy, and studied the Inza Rinzai koan-curriculum with Muso Joko Roshi (1884–1948, aka Hannyakutsu Joko Roshi), a Shingon priest who studied the koans with another Shingon priest, Muchaku Kaiko Roshi (1871–1928); Kaiko in turn studied koans with Kazan Genku (1837–1917), a Rinzai Zen-priest of the Myoshin-ji branch of Rinzai Zen. Muso Joko established the Fuji Hannya Dojo and the Tokyo Hannya Dojo, which was led by Koryū Osaka in the 1930s, before he was drafted into the military, and then again after the war.

== Lineage ==
Koryū Osaka was trained in the Inzan koan-curriculum, which traces its lineages to Hakuin Ekaku. Inzan Ien was a dharma-successor of Gasan Jitō (1727–1797), who received Inka from Tōrei Enji (1721–1792) dharma heirs. Gasan received Dharma transmission from Rinzai teacher Gessen Zen'e, who had received dharma transmission from Kogetsu Zenzai, before meeting Hakuin. While Gasan is considered to be a dharma heir of Hakuin, "he did not belong to the close circle of disciples and was probably not even one of Hakuin's dharma heirs," studying with Hakuin but completing his koan-training with Tōrei Enji. Koryū Osaka's koan-study lineage can be constructed as follows:

- Shoju Rojin (Dokyu Etan) (1642–1721)
- Hakuin Ekaku (白隱慧鶴) (1686–1769)(did not receive formal dharma-transmission from Shoju Rojin)
- Tōrei Enji (1721–1792)
- Gasan Jitō (峨山慈棹) (1727–1797)
- Inzan Ien (隱山惟琰) (1751–1814)
- Taigen Shigen (太元孜元) (1768–1837)
- Gisan Zenrai (儀山善來) (1802–1878)
- Ekkei Shuken (越溪守謙) (1810–1884)
- Kazan Genku (禾山玄皷) (1837–1917) [西山禾山 Nishiyama]
- Muchaku Kaikō (無着戒光) (1871–1928), Shingon priest
- Muso Jōkō (無相定光), aka Hannyakutsu Joko Roshi (1884–1949), Shingon priest
- Musa Kōryū (無作光龍) (1901–1985) [苧坂 Ōsaka]

== See also ==
- Sanbo Kyodan

== Sources ==
Printed sources

- Besserman, Perle; Steger, Manfred (2011) [1991], Zen Radicals, Rebels, and Reformers, Wisdom Publications, ISBN 9780861716913
- Dumoulin, Heinrich (2005), Zen Buddhism: A History. Volume 2: Japan, World Wisdom Books, ISBN 9780941532907
- Maezumi, Taizan; Glassman, Bernard (1976), On Zen Practice II, Zen Center of Los Angeles
- McDaniel, Richard Bryan (2013), Zen Masters of Japan. The Second Step East, Tuttle Publishing

Web-sources
