= Great Vow Zen Monastery =

Coordinates: 46°09′14″N 123°09′09″W

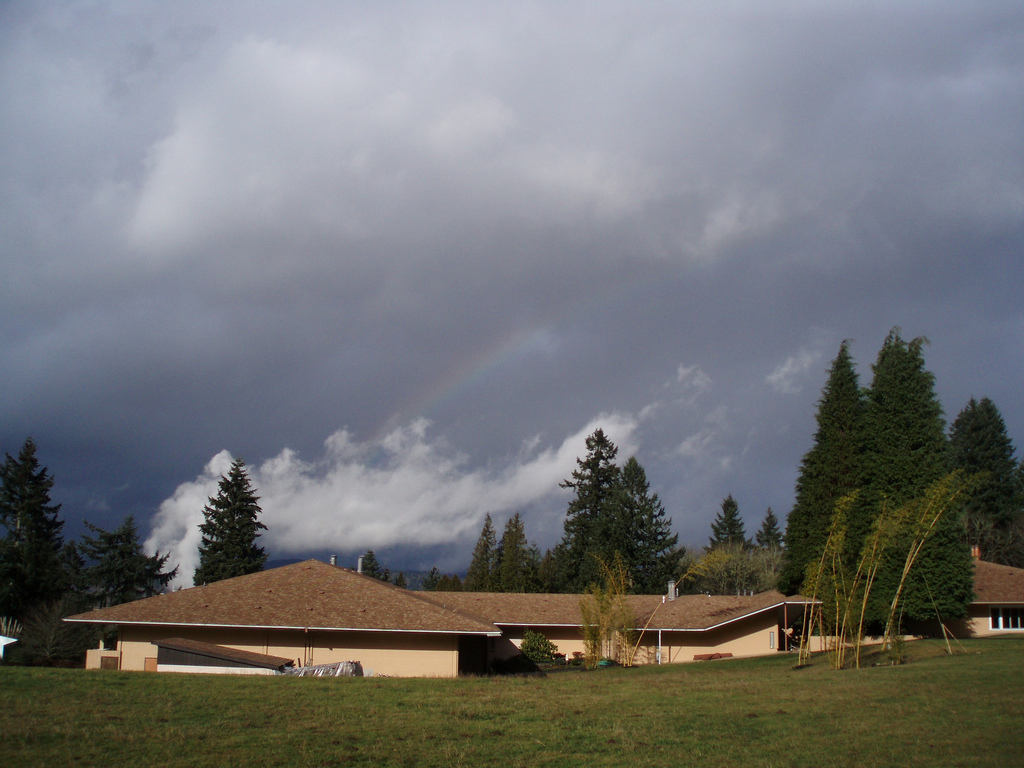

Religion
- Affiliation: White Plum Asanga

Location
- Location: Clatskanie, Oregon 97016
- Country: United States
- Interactive map of Great Vow Zen Monastery

Architecture
- Completed: 2002

Website
- www.zendust.org/

Great Vow Zen Monastery was founded in 2002 and is operated by Zen Community of Oregon (ZCO) under the leadership of abbots Chozen Bays, Roshi, and Hogen Bays, Roshi. The monastery offers a public Sunday morning program, weekend workshops, weeklong meditation retreats, and special events throughout the year.

== Teachers ==
Great Vow Zen Monastery is a training monastery in the White Plum lineage of the Japanese Soto Zen tradition. It is headed by Abbots Hogen Bays and Jan Chozen Bays.

== Physical environment ==
The monastery is housed in a former elementary school on 20 acres (81,000 m^{2}) of land overlooking the Columbia River floodplain near Clatskanie, Oregon. Two former classroom "pods" serve as dormitory wings for residents and visitors. Administrative offices and the meditation hall occupy the center of the building.

The monastery building is surrounded by an open meadow; a wooded area with extensive walking trails sits behind the building.

== Zen training ==
The overall style of training at the monastery is primarily in the Soto Zen vein, but incorporates elements from various schools of Buddhism, as well as from other disciplines.

The daily training schedule, which is followed by all residents, includes a wakeup bell at 4:50 a.m., two hours of meditation, a bowing and chanting service, breakfast, and two periods of work. Lunch and dinner are both preceded by a short religious service. Two hours of meditation in the evening end the day. The schedule may be modified at various times of year, or to accommodate special events or classes.

Weekend workshops and weeklong meditation intensives are held monthly.

Visiting teachers often lead or co-lead meditation retreats or weekend workshops at the monastery, sometimes on a recurring annual basis. Among them are Buddhist teachers Gyokuko Carlson, Daniel P. Brown, Keith Dowman, Arinna Weisman, B. Alan Wallace, and Ajahn Amaro.

Great Vow also offers ordination and full-time residential training as a Soto Zen Buddhist priest.

== Jizo Bodhisattva ==
The bodhisattva known as Jizo (in the Japanese tradition; Kṣitigarbha in Sanskrit) has an important role at Great Vow. Practice with Jizo Bodhisattva includes daily chanting of the Jizo mantra, manufacture of Jizo images for sale, a meditation retreat, biannual ceremonies for children and loved ones who have died, and a yearly Jizo-Bon festival event in August.

== Support ==
The monastery is sustained by the members of ZCO, which includes a substantial lay congregation that meets for sitting meditation in Portland at Heart of Wisdom Zen Temple, and a handful of associated satellite groups in Oregon, Washington, and British Columbia.

The monastery is also supported by fundraising efforts, donations from visitors, retreat and workshop fees, and the sale of meditation supplies and Buddhist images.

== Visitors ==
Great Vow Zen Monastery has a public Sunday morning program at 10 a.m., which consists of a short chanting service followed by meditation, a talk given by one of the teachers, and lunch.

Visitors may arrange short-term stays at the monastery.

Both monastery residents and short-term visitors sleep in gender-specific dormitories of several beds to a room. All meals are vegetarian.

== Gallery ==
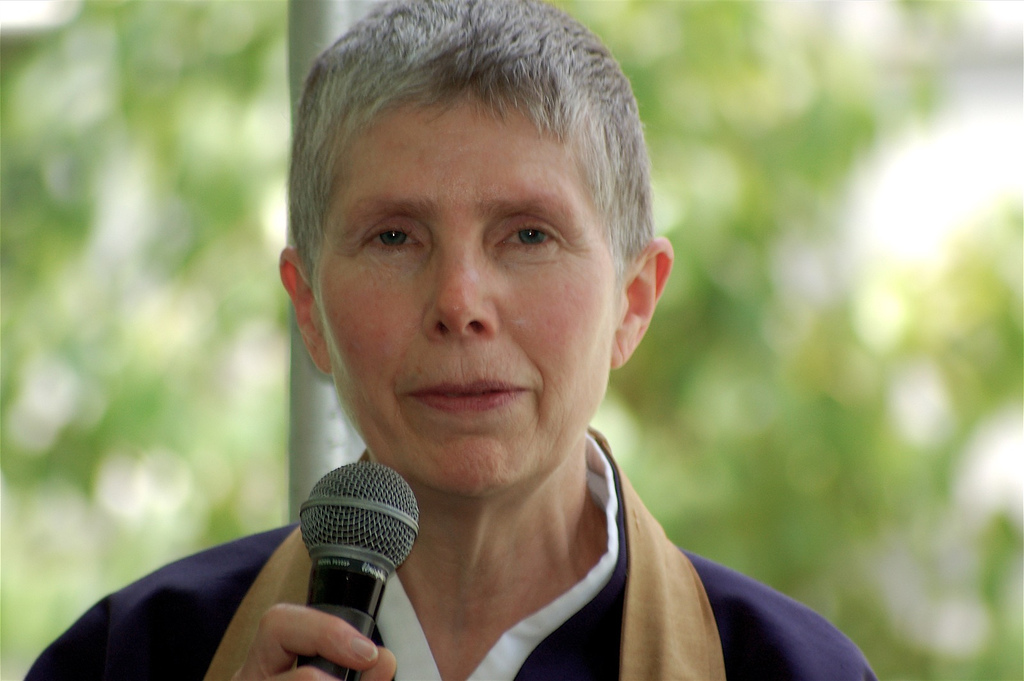
Abbot Chozen Bays

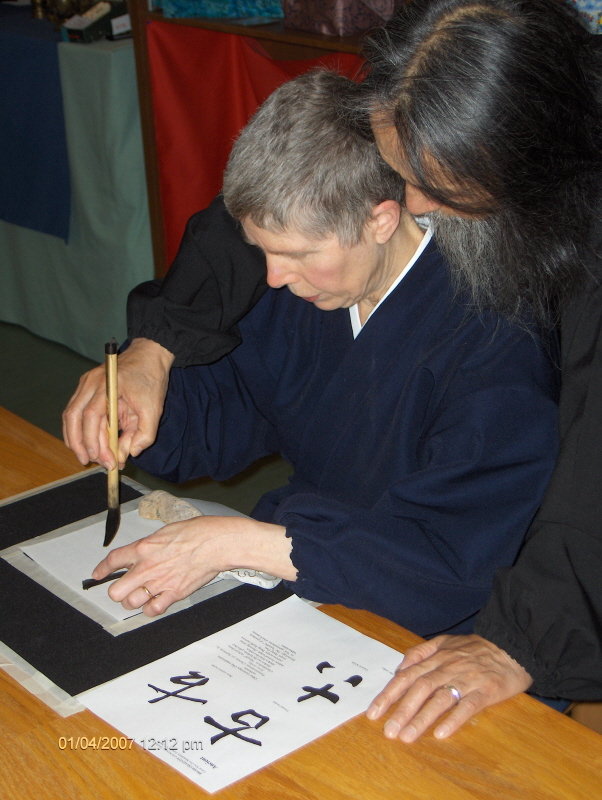
Chozen Roshi with Kaz Tanahashi

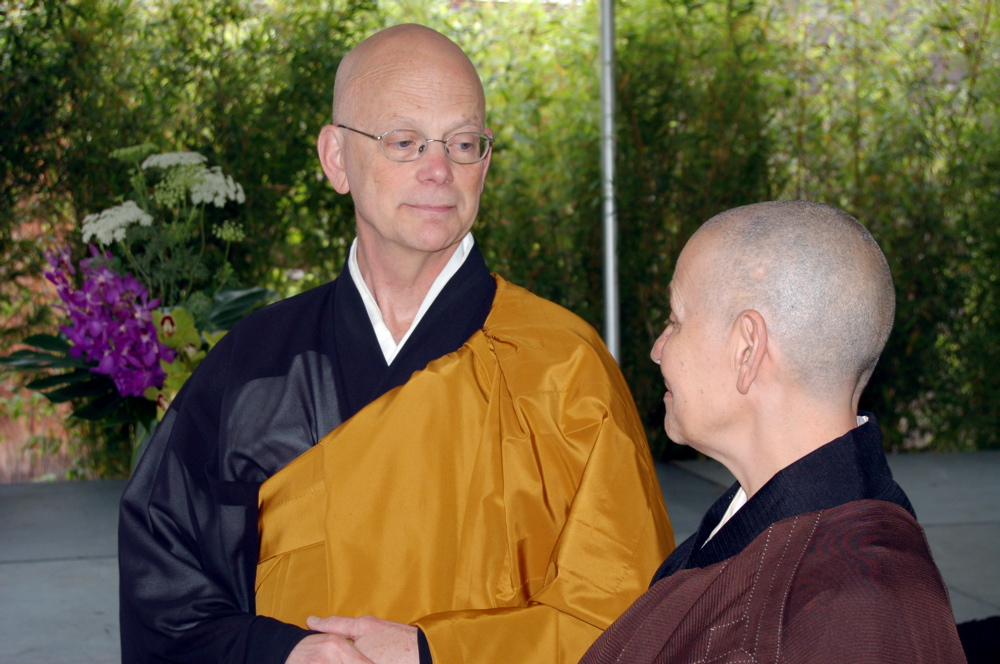
Abbot Hogen Bays

== See also ==
- Buddhism in the United States
- Timeline of Zen Buddhism in the United States
