= John Tesshin Sanderson =

- Title: Roshi

Personal life
- Born: United States

Religious life
- Religion: Zen Buddhism
- School: Sōtō
- Lineage: White Plum Asanga

Senior posting
- Predecessor: Taizan Maezumi
- Website: Centro Zen de México

John Tesshin Sanderson is a Soto Zen roshi spiritual director of the Centro Zen de México in Coyoacán, Mexico City, one of twelve Dharma Successors of the late Taizan Maezumi. He moved to Mexico in 1987 at the request of Maezumi, and has been teaching there ever since.

He is also the spiritual director of the Comunidad Budista Zen Jardín de Luz" in Spain.

== Sources ==
- Melton, J. Gordon; Martin Baumann (2002). Religions of the World: A Comprehensive Encyclopedia of Beliefs and Practices. ABC-Clio. ISBN 1-57607-761-6.
