= Taizan Maezumi =

Japanese Zen Buddhist teacher

Hakuyū Taizan Maezumi 前角 博雄
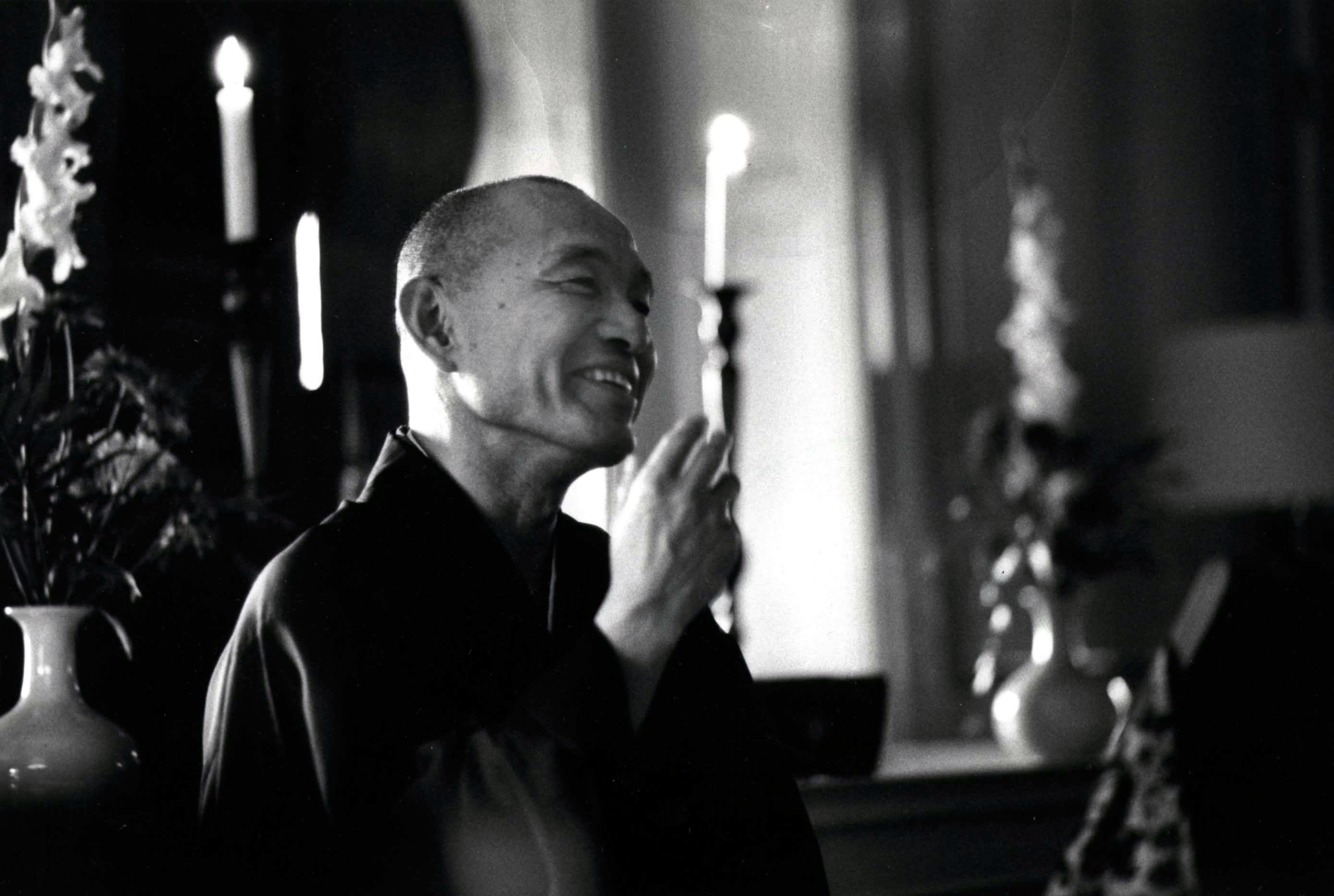
- Title: Rōshi

Personal life
- Born: February 24, 1931 Otawara, Tochigi, Japan
- Died: May 14, 1995 (aged 64) Tokyo, Japan
- Spouse: Martha Ekyo Maezumi
- Children: Kyrie Maezumi; Yuri Jundo; Shira Yoshimi
- Education: Komazawa University

Religious life
- Religion: Buddhism
- School: Sōtō; Rinzai
- Lineage: Baian Hakujun Dai-osho (Note: White Plum Asanga website)

Senior posting
- Predecessor: Baian Hakujun Kuroda; Koryū Osaka; Hakuun Yasutani

Hakuyū Taizan Maezumi (前角 博雄 Maezumi Hakuyū, February 24, 1931 – May 15, 1995) was a Japanese Sōtō Zen Buddhist priest who substantially contributed to development of Zen in the United States.

In 1956 he was sent to the United States to serve as a priest for a Japanese-American congregation in Los Angeles. After taking English classes, Maezumi began holding zazen for Western students early in the 1960s, founding the Zen Center of Los Angeles in 1967.

After studying koans with Hakuun Yasutani and lay-teacher Koryū Osaka, (Note: Barry Kaigen McMahon, The Evolution of the White Plum. A short and incomplete history of its founders and their practice: "The second point Bernie and I discussed was his objection to White Plum teachers claiming dharma transmission in the Rinzai line. His point was that Maezumi Roshi's transmission came from his father in the Soto school and Yasutani Roshi also in the Soto school even though trained in koans by Harada Sogaku, again in the Soto school. Claiming Rinzai transmission from Osaka Koryu Roshi was inaccurate, according to Bernie, as Koryu Roshi was head of an independent lay organization, the Shakamuni-kai, started by his teacher, Muso Joko, who was himself officially of the Shingon sect, not actually a part of the modern day Rinzai monastic system.") in his teachings and practice Maezumi combined Sōtō-style shikantaza with Harada Daiun Sogaku's kōan-curriculum, which uses both Rinzai and Soto kōan-collections. (Note: Barry Kaigen McMahon, The Evolution of the White Plum. A short and incomplete history of its founders and their practice: "Some years ago Bernie Roshi and I had an email exchange in which we discussed two White Plum issues. The first issue was this addition of the Shoyoroku and Denko-roku to the koan system that Yasutani and the White Plum has employed. Where did that come from? We concluded that those texts, which are considered to be Soto texts and not used in the Rinzai school, must have been added by Harada Sogaku, with interpretations and answers provided by Harada Sogaku himself. Whether Yasutani or Maezumi Roshis stuck to the answers that Harada wanted I do not know.) In 1979 Maezumi and his first dharma-heir Bernie Glassman informally conceived the White Plum Asanga, a "community of peers" of dharma-heirs of Maezumi and their successors, "represent[ing] the vision of Maezumi Roshi."

Maezumi publicly admitted he was an alcoholic in 1983, coinciding with revelations that he had been having sexual relationships with some of his female students. Many students and several of his dharma heirs left the Zen Center of Los Angeles, founding their own Zen communities.

== Biography ==
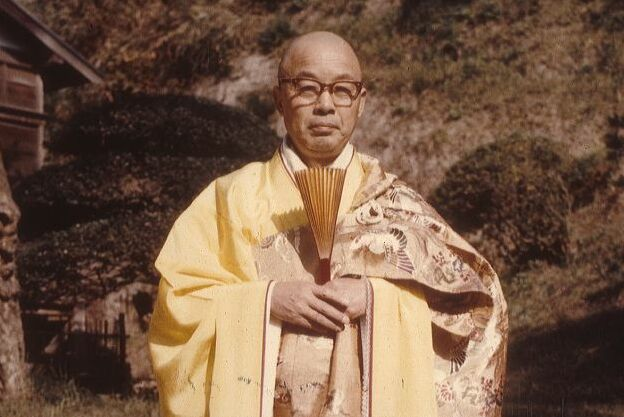
Maezumi's father, Baian Hakujun Kuroda

Maezumi was born in Japan on February 24, 1931, to Yoshiko Kuroda-Maezumi and Baian Hakujun Kuroda, a prominent Sōtō priest, in his father's temple in Ōtawara, Tochigi. In later years, he took the name Maezumi, his mother's maiden name. He was ordained as a novice monk in the Sōtō lineage at age eleven, and in high school began studying koans under a lay Rinzai instructor, Koryū Osaka. While studying under Koryu he attended Komazawa University—receiving degrees in oriental literature and philosophy. After college he trained at Sōji-ji, and then received shihō from his father in 1955, a standard procedure in the Soto-sect, where local temple-propriety is inherited from father to son. In 1956 he was sent to the United States to serve as a priest at the Zenshuji Soto Mission in Little Tokyo, Los Angeles, a Japanese-American neighborhood, working part-time at a factory.

The Zenshuji Soto Mission served a Japanese-American congregation and placed little emphasis on zazen. During his early years in Los Angeles, Maezumi sat occasionally with Nyogen Senzaki in nearby Boyle Heights. In 1959, he took classes in English at San Francisco State University, met Shunryū Suzuki, and occasionally visited Suzuki's temple, Sokoji, for ceremonies.

Maezumi later recalled that he wanted to sit zazen with people in the United States, including non-Japanese practitioners, but that such participation was not welcomed within Zenshuji's congregation. In the early 1960s, he began holding zazen at Zenshuji for Western students, but due to the tension that eventually led to the opening of the Zen Center of Los Angeles in 1967. That same year, he married his first wife, Charlene; they divorced in 1971. (Note: Profiles of Zen/Ch'an Buddhists)

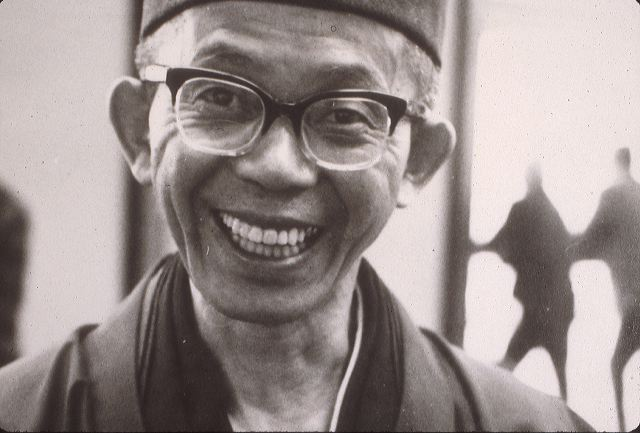
Koryu Osaka

Also in 1967, Maezumi began the study of the Takuju koan-curriculum with Hakuun Yasutani, who had left the Soto-sect, completing kōan study under him (Note: Yasutani studied koans with his Soto-teacher Harada Daiun Sogaku, who in turn had studied koans with the Rinzai-priest Kogenshitsu Dokutan Sosan.) and receiving his inka (dharma transmission) in 1970. He also did koan-study with lay teacher Koryū Osaka of the Shakamuni-kai, who studied the Inzan koan-system with a Shingon-priest, receiving Osaka's inka in 1973. (Note: Barry Kaigen McMahon, The Evolution of the White Plum. A short and incomplete history of its founders and their practice)

In 1975 Maezumi married his second wife, Martha Ekyo Maezumi, and later the couple had three children (his daughter Kyrie Maezumi is an actress). In 1976, Maezumi founded the non-profit Kuroda Institute for the Study of Buddhism and Human Values, promoting academic scholarship on Buddhist topics. The White Plum Asanga was also established during this period. His senior student Tetsugen Bernard Glassman opened the Zen Community of New York in 1979 with Maezumi's blessing and encouragement. Another student, John Daido Loori, acquired land in the Catskill Mountains of New York and in 1980 established Zen Mountain Monastery (ZMM) with Maezumi; Loori was installed as Abbot at ZMM in 1989. That following year Maezumi founded a summer retreat for the ZCLA called the Yokoji Zen Mountain Center, which today serves as a year-round residential and non-residential Zen training center. In 1984 another student, Dennis Merzel, left ZCLA to establish the Kanzeon.

Maezumi publicly admitted he was an alcoholic in 1983, and sought treatment at the Betty Ford Center. This coincided with revelations that he had been having sexual relationships with some of his female followers at the Zen Center of Los Angeles despite being married to his wife, Martha Ekyo Maezumi, "including one of the recipients of his dharma transmission". According to Kirsten Mitsuyo Maezumi, this "caused the separation of my parents and was the reason my mother left the Zen Center of Los Angeles with my brother and [me] in 1983".

Maezumi was forthcoming in admitting his mistakes and did not justify his behaviors. These events caused much turmoil in his school, and many students left as a result. Some members who stayed described themselves as forced to see Maezumi on a more human level, even seeing this period as a breakthrough for them, no longer deluded into thinking a teacher could be beyond imperfection. Both Bays and Tetsugen Bernard Glassman founded their own sanghas at this time. When remembering Maezumi, author David Chadwick had this to say: "I'd say he had an interesting mix of humility and arrogance. Mainly to me he'd seem arrogant at a distance, but close up he'd be right there with me not putting on any airs."

== Teaching style ==
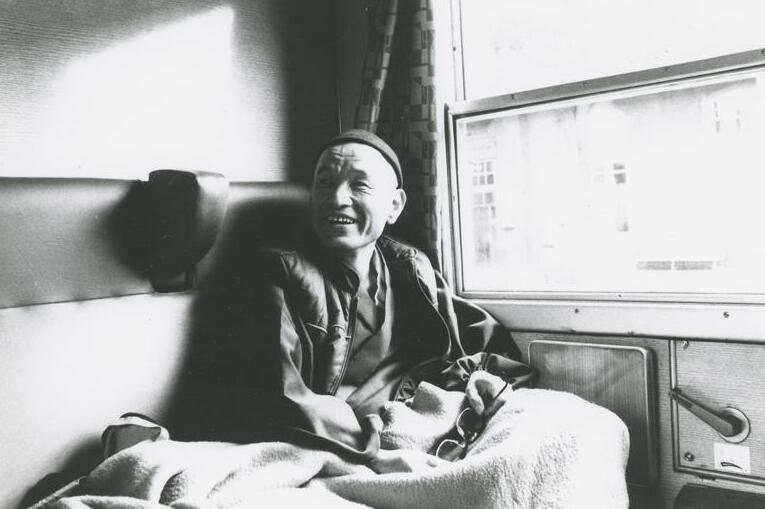
On the way to Poland 1992

Due to his training in both Soto and Rinzai style, Maezumi Sōtō-style shikantaza with Harada Daiun Sogakus kōan-curriculum, which uses both Rinzai and Soto kōan-collections. He was known to be especially strict about the posture of his students while sitting zazen. Maezumi used a range of kōans from different Zen traditions, including the Blue Cliff Record, The Gateless Gate, Transmission of the Lamp, and the Book of Equanimity. According to author and Dharma Successor Gerry Shishin Wick, Maezumi was also fond of a particular saying—"appreciate your life." This also is the title of a compiled book of teachings by Maezumi, published by Shambhala Publications. In it Maezumi says, "I encourage you. Please enjoy this wonderful life together. Appreciate the world just this! There is nothing extra. Genuinely appreciate your life as the most precious treasure and take good care of it."

== Death ==
Maezumi died on May 15, 1995, while visiting his family in Japan, drowning in bath while being drunk. Not long before dying, he intended to create an inka shomei (dharma transmission) ceremony for Tetsugen Bernard Glassman, to acknowledge the Sanbo Kyodan connection of his past as an integral part of the Dharma transmission of White Plum Asanga.

== Legacy and dharma successors ==
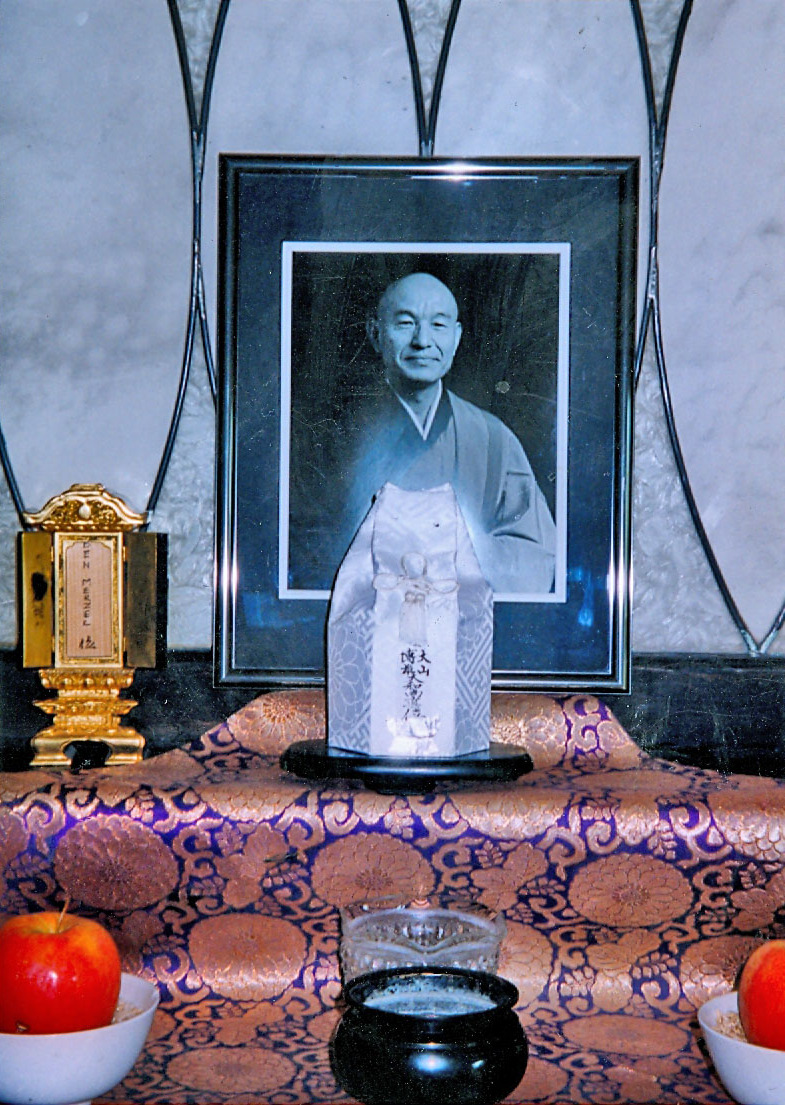
Maezumi's ashes

Maezumi's main concern was to leave a number of American dharma heirs, and he named twelve dharma successors, ordained sixty-eight priests, and administered the Buddhist precepts to over five hundred individuals. Author James Ishmael Ford says,

His influence on the shape of Western Zen is incalculable.

Jan Chozen Bays says,

To me, Maezumi's genius lay in his ability to see the buddhanature and also teaching potential in many different kinds of people. There are some Zen teachers who have no successors or maybe one or two. Maezumi was more the Tibetan style—scatter the seeds widely, some will grow and some will not. We won't know for several generations which of his successors have established lineages that will continue."

His daughter Kirsten Mitsuyo Maezumi writes:

He was not a good father, or a good husband to my mother, but he was an outstanding teacher with a love for the dharma and a vision of liberation that took precedence in all he did.

As an adult, in my travels and own seeking, I hear testimonials to his awakened Buddha nature and hear and see the proof of it in the difference it has made for so many other gifted beings to step into their place as teachers and facilitators of peace and consciousness.

It is a lineage spanning continents and decades and I am very proud of him. It is the best consolation I can have; seeing and hearing his students teach.

Maezumi gave Dharma transmission to the following individuals:

- Tetsugen Bernard Glassman
- Dennis Merzel
- Joko Beck
- Jan Chozen Bays
- John Daido Loori
- Gerry Shishin Wick
- John Tesshin Sanderson
- Alfred Jitsudo Ancheta
- Charles Tenshin Fletcher
- Susan Myoyu Andersen
- Nicolee Jikyo McMahon
- William Nyogen Yeo

== Bibliography ==
- 1976 On Zen Practice: Body, Breath, Mind by Maezumi and Tetsugen Bernard Glassman
- 1978 On Zen Practice II: Body, Breath, Mind (a.k.a. The Hazy Moon of Enlightenment) by Maezumi and Tetsugen Bernard Glassman
- 1978 Way of Everyday Life
- 1998 Echoless Valley
- 2001 Appreciate Your Life: Zen Teachings of Taizan Maezumi Roshi
- 2001 Teaching of the Great Mountain: Zen Talks by Taizan Maezumi edited by Anton Tenkei Coppens

== See also ==
- Buddhism in the United States
- Buddhism in the West
- List of Rinzai Buddhists
- Timeline of Zen Buddhism in the United States

== Sources ==
Printed sources

- "Hakuyu Taizan Maezumi Roshi (Big Mind bio)". Big Mind. Archived from the original on 2008-01-09.
- Fletcher, Charles Tenshin; David Scott (2001). Way of ZEN. Thomas Dunne Books St. Martin's Press. ISBN 0-312-20620-8.
- Ford, James Ishmael (2006). Zen Master Who?: A Guide to the People and Stories of Zen. Wisdom publications. pp. 162–166. ISBN 0-86171-509-8.
- Melton, J. Gordon (1999). "MAEZUMI, Hakuyu Taizan". In J. Gordon Melton (ed.). Religious Leaders of America: A Biographical Guide to Founders and Leaders of Religious Bodies, Churches, and Spiritual Groups in North America. Gale Research.
- Preston, David L. (1988). The Social Organization of Zen Practice: Constructing Transcultural Reality. Cambridge University Press. ISBN 0-521-35000-X.
- Silberman, Steve (2021). ""Roshi, You Are Drunk"". Lion's Roar.
- Sutton, Robert P. (2005). Modern American Communes: A Dictionary. Greenwood Press. ISBN 0-313-32181-7.

Web-sources
