= Joko Beck =

American Zen teacher and author (1917–2011)

- Title: Zen Teacher

Personal life
- Born: March 27, 1917 United States
- Died: June 15, 2011 (aged 94)

Religious life
- Religion: Zen Buddhism
- School: Ordinary Mind School

Senior posting
- Predecessor: Hakuyu Taizan Maezumi

Charlotte Joko Beck (March 27, 1917 – June 15, 2011) was an American Zen teacher and the author of the books Everyday Zen: Love and Work and Nothing Special: Living Zen.

== Biography ==
Born in New Jersey, Beck studied music at the Oberlin Conservatory of Music and worked for some time as a pianist and piano teacher. She married and raised a family of four children, then separated from her husband and worked as a teacher, secretary, and assistant in a university department. She began Zen practice in her 40s with Hakuyu Taizan Maezumi in Los Angeles, and later with Hakuun Yasutani and Soen Nakagawa. Beck received Dharma transmission from Taizan Maezumi Roshi in 1978, but broke with Maezumi over his actions and opened Zen Center San Diego in 1983, serving as its head teacher until July 2006.

Beck was responsible for a number of important innovations in Zen teaching. Because she was adept at teaching students to work with their psychological states, she attracted a number of students who were interested in the relationship between Zen and modern psychology. Several of her Dharma heirs are practicing psychologists/psychiatrists. In 1995 Joko, along with three of her Dharma heirs, founded the Ordinary Mind Zen School.

Shortly after Beck's departure in 2006, she revoked Dharma transmission from two senior students: Ezra Bayda and Elizabeth Hamilton. Beck also stated that Zen Center San Diego should not claim to represent her or her teaching. In 2006 Joko moved to Prescott, Arizona, where she continued to teach until she retired as a teacher in late 2010. In the spring of 2010, Joko announced Gary Nafstad as her last Dharma successor.

Beck died on June 15, 2011, at age 94.

== Lineage ==
Joko Beck appointed nine teachers:

1. Christensen, Larry Jissan
2. Christenson, Anna
3. Dawson, Geoff
4. Howard, Gregg
5. Magid, Barry (b. 1949)
6. Nafstad, Gary (b. 1949)
7. Penn, Barbara Muso (d. 2023)
8. Smith, Elihu Genmyo (b. 1948)
9. Rizzetto, Diane Eshin (b. 1942)

From two other teachers she later sought to revoke her appointment:

1. Bayda, Ezra (b. 1944) (revoked 2006)
2. Hamilton, Elizabeth (b. 1942) (revoked 2006)

== Books ==
- Beck, Charlotte Joko (2021). Ordinary Wonder. Shambhala Publications. ISBN 978-1-61180-877-3.
- Beck, Joko; Smith, Steve (1989). Everyday Zen: Love and Work. Harper Collins. ISBN 0-06-060734-3.
- Beck, Joko (1993). Nothing Special: Living Zen. HarperCollins. ISBN 0-06-251117-3.

== See also ==
- Timeline of Zen Buddhism in the United States
