= Zen Center of Los Angeles =

Zen center in Los Angeles founded in 1967

Coordinates: 34.0551°N 118.3000°W

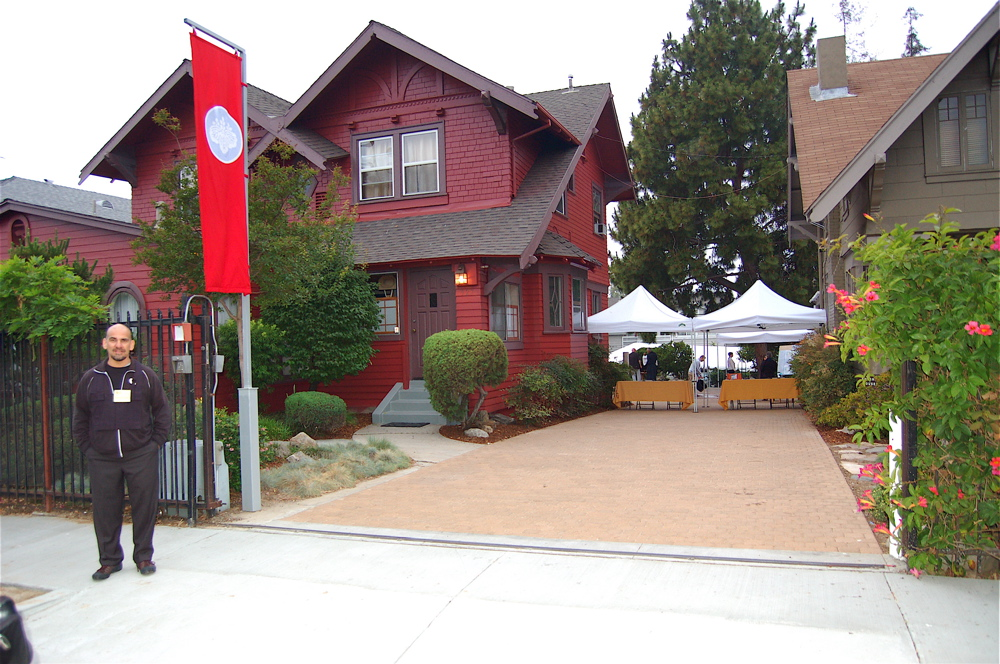

Religion
- Affiliation: White Plum Asanga

Location
- Location: 923 S. Normandie Ave, Los Angeles 90006
- Country: United States
- Interactive map of Zen Center of Los Angeles

Architecture
- Founder: Taizan Maezumi
- Completed: 1967

Website
- www.zencenter.org/

The Zen Center of Los Angeles (ZCLA), temple name Buddha Essence Temple, is a Zen center founded by Hakuyu Taizan Maezumi in 1967 that practices in the White Plum lineage.

ZCLA observes a daily schedule of zazen, Buddhist services, and work practice. The Center's programs include introductory classes, sesshin, workshops and training periods, as well as face-to-face meetings with Abbot Wendy Egyoku Nakao and other Center teachers. The sangha practices zazen and koan training in the Maezumi-Glassman lineage.

ZCLA's mission is to know the Self, maintain the precepts, and serve others. The Center serves by providing the teaching, training, and transmission of Zen Buddhism. ZCLA's vision is an enlightened world in which suffering is transcended, all beings live in harmony, everyone has enough, deep wisdom is realized, and compassion flows unhindered.

== See also ==
- Buddhism in the United States
- Timeline of Zen Buddhism in the United States

== Gallery ==
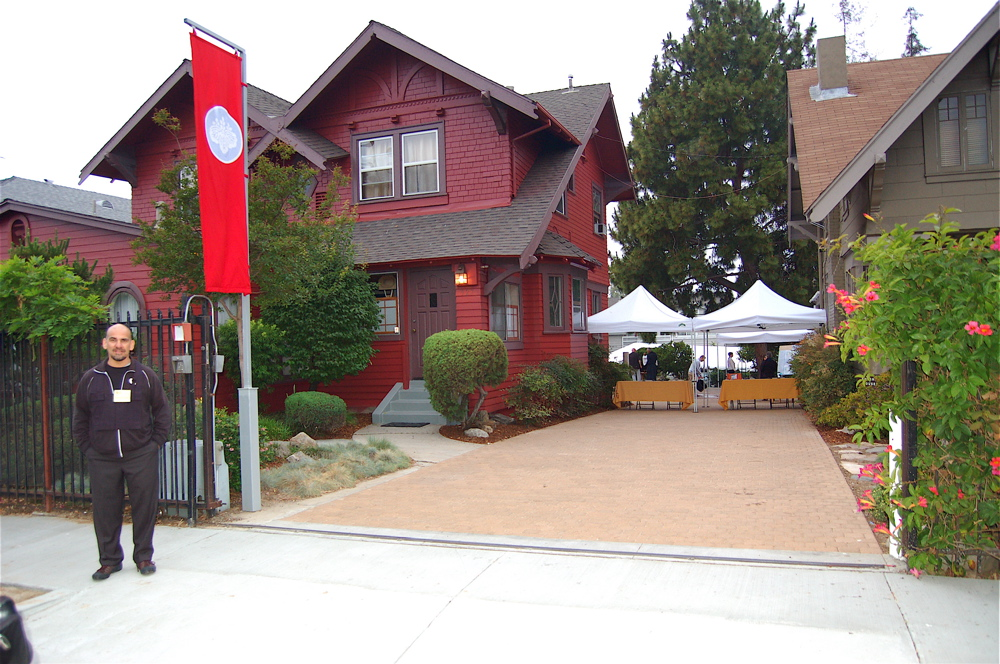
Conrad Butsugen Romo in front of ZCLA during the 40th Anniversary celebration

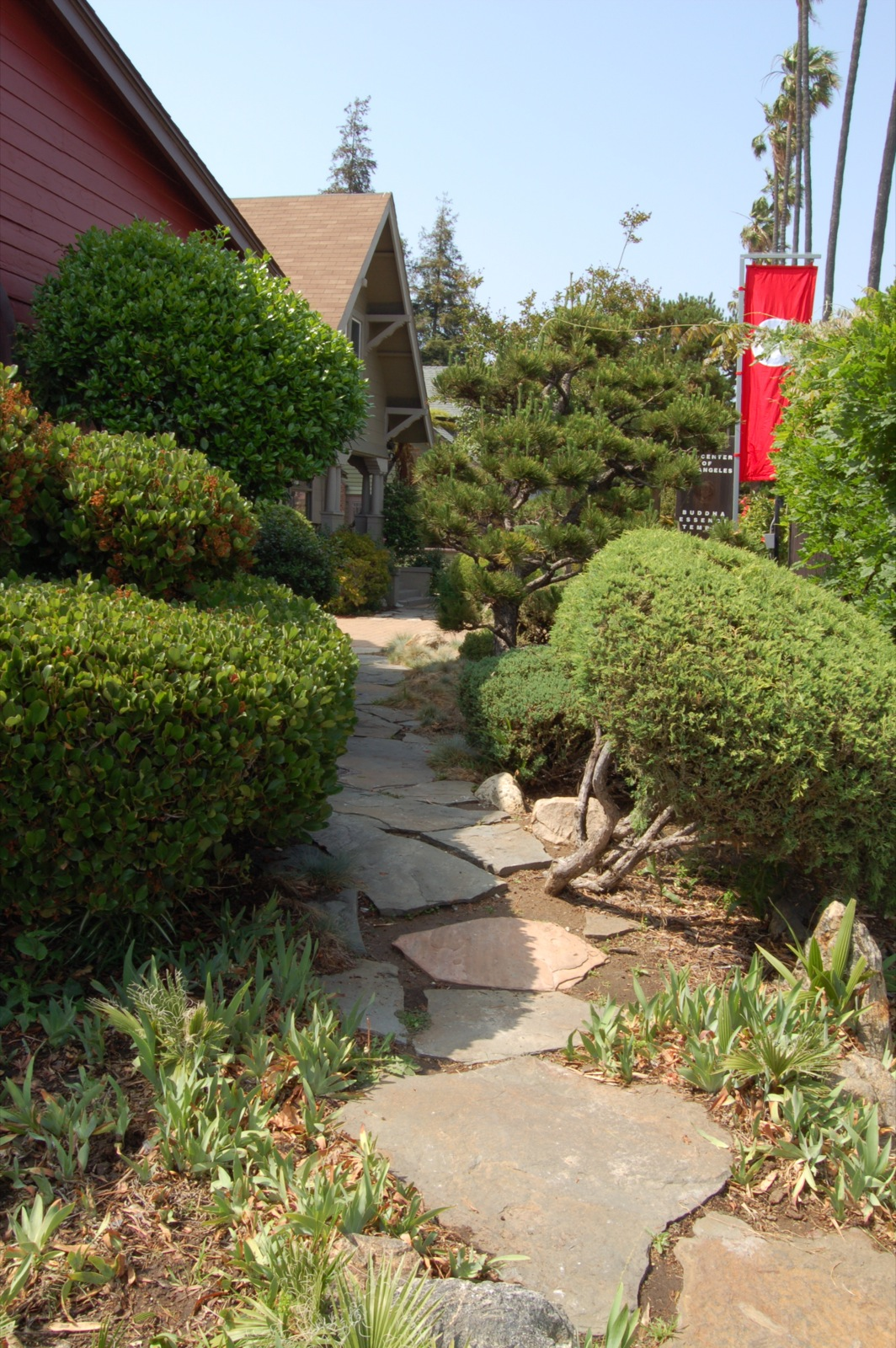

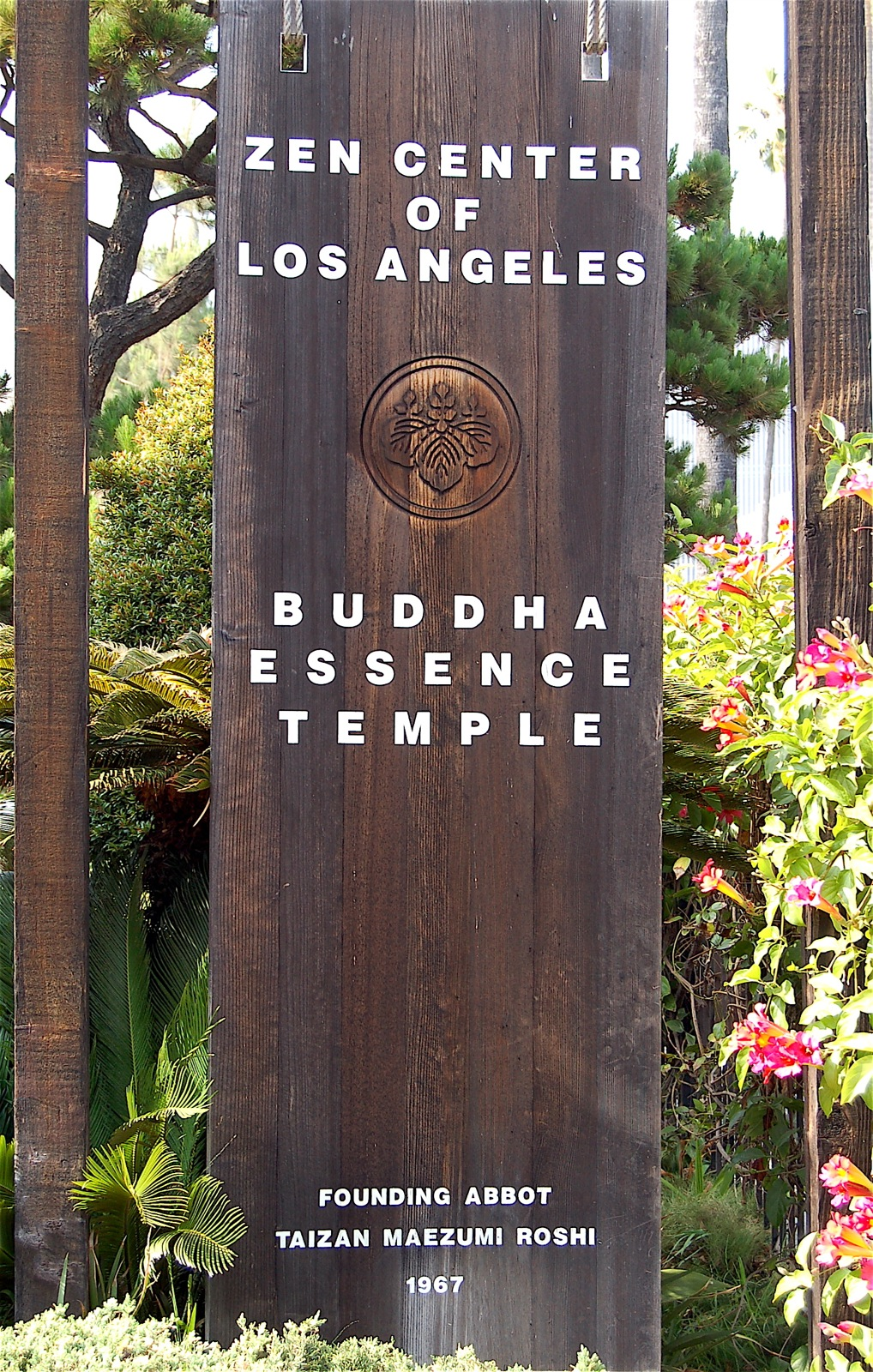

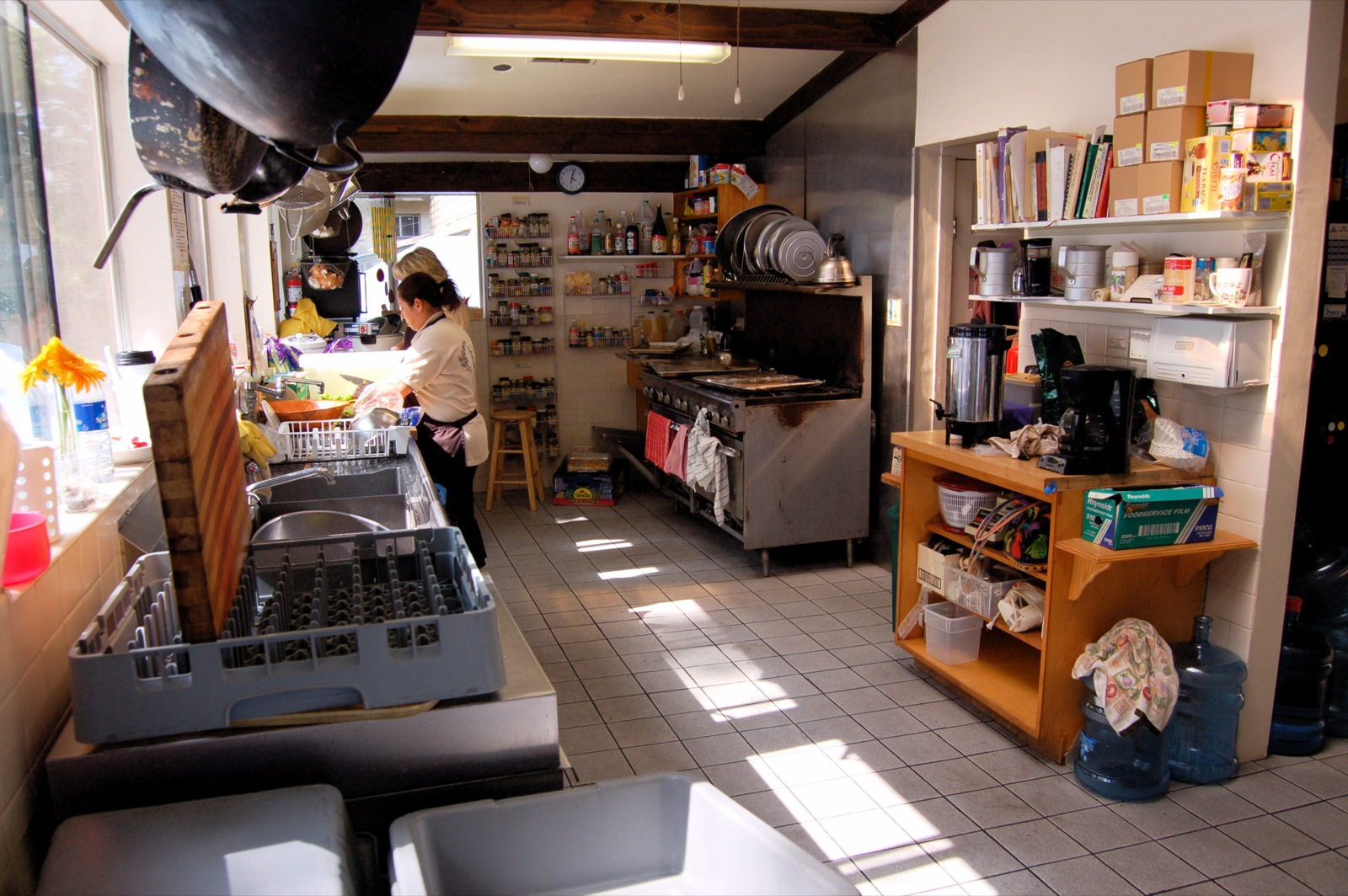

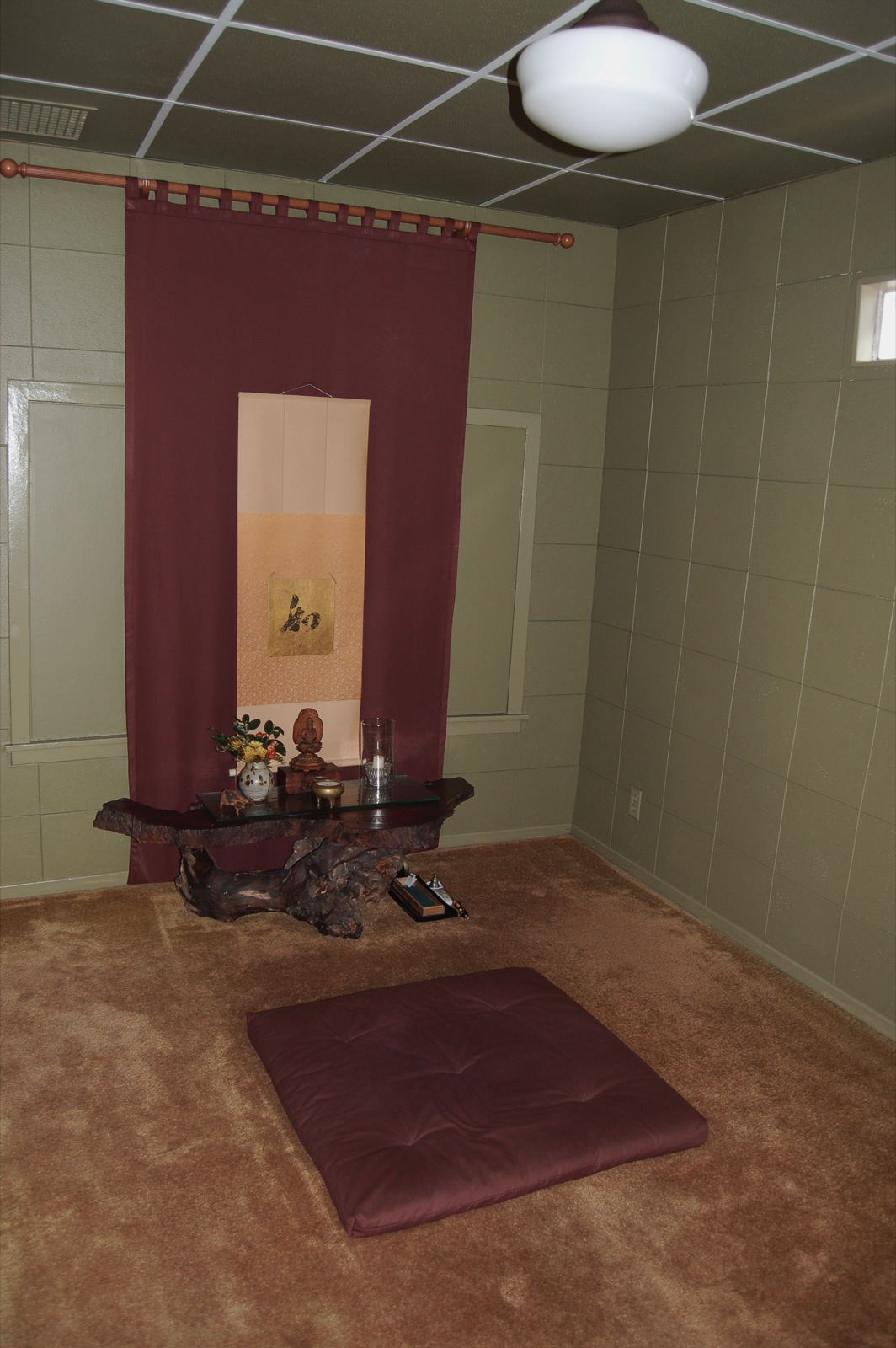

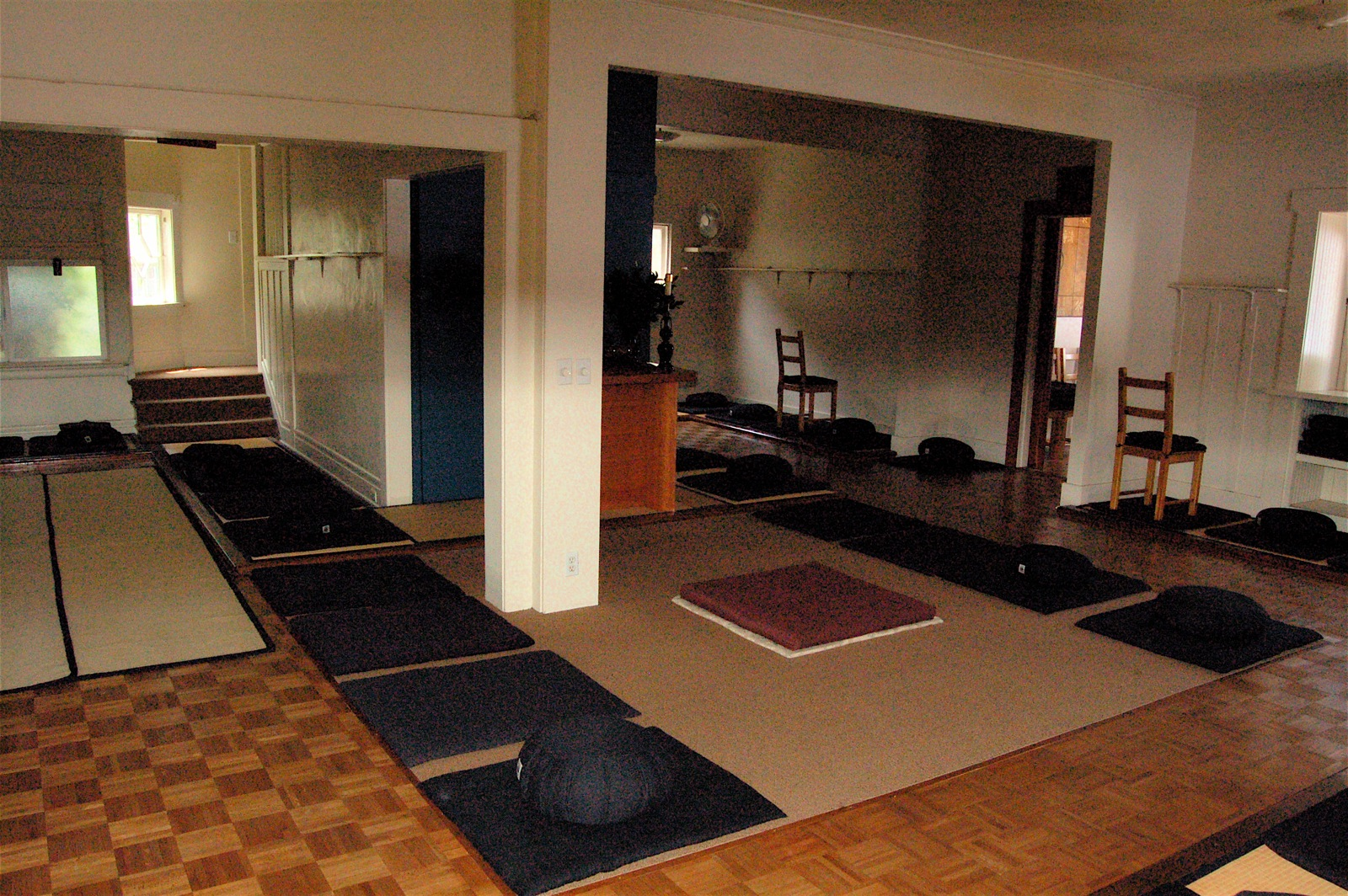

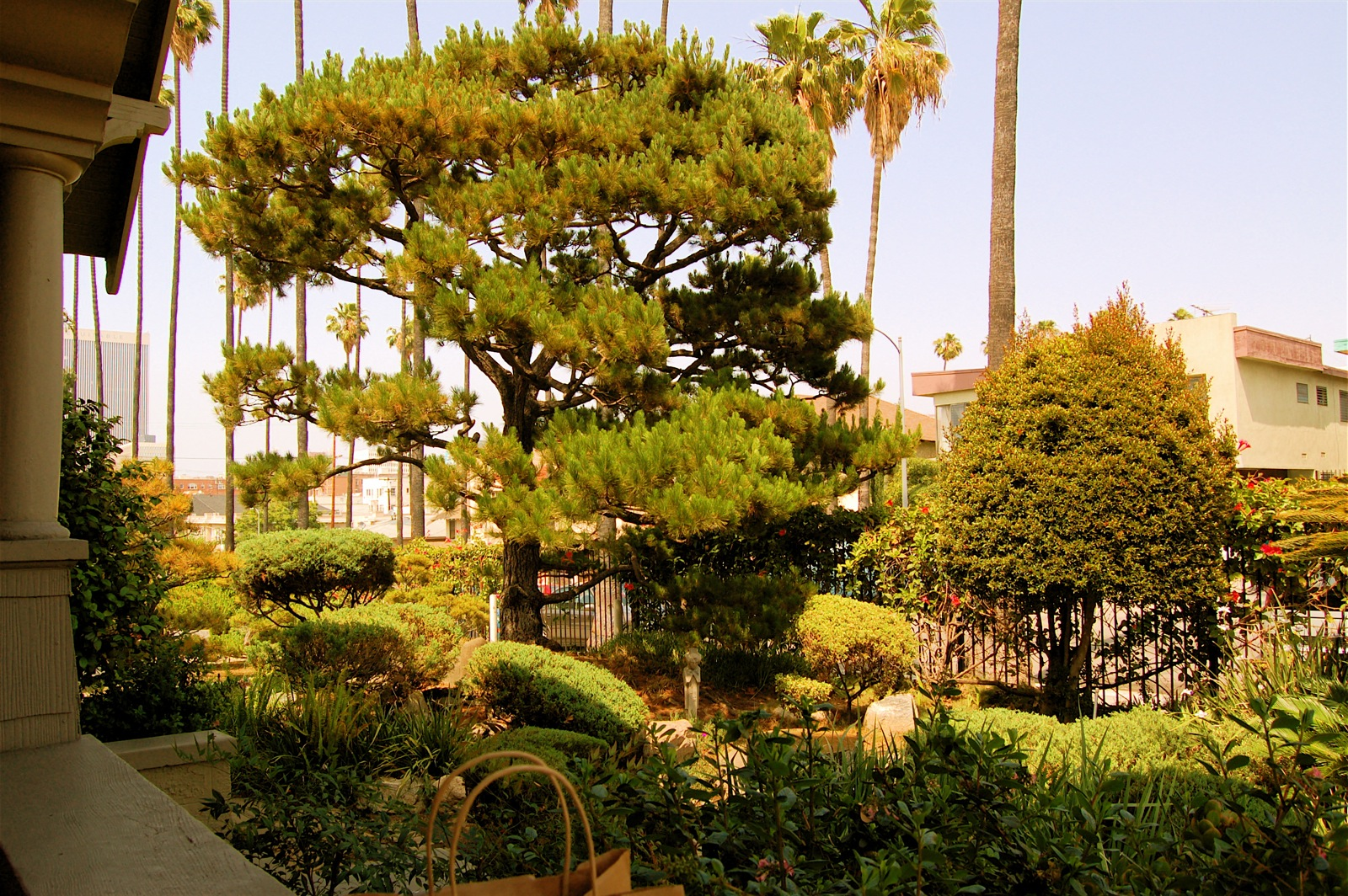

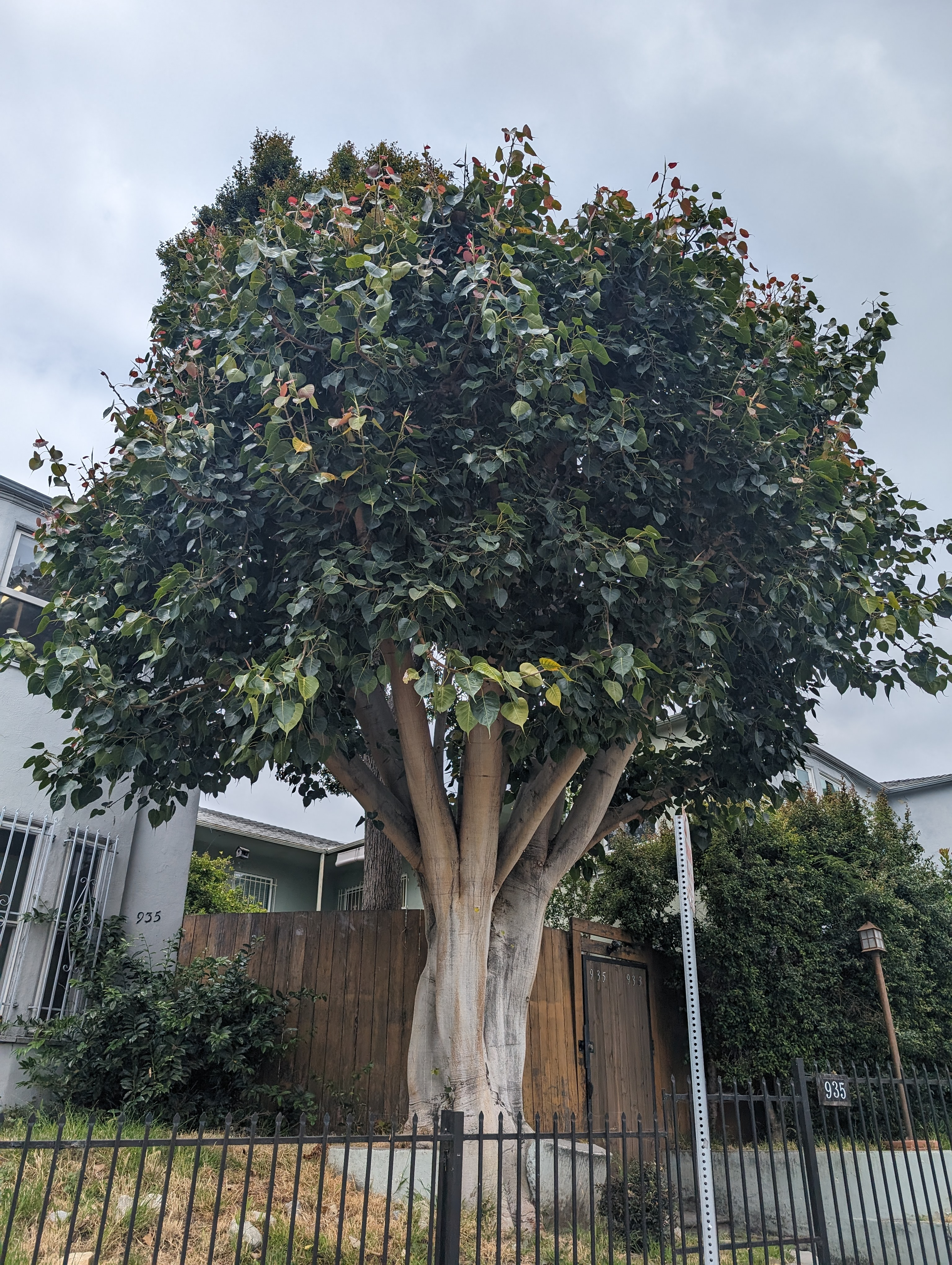
Bodhi tree (Ficus religiosa) on the grounds of the Zen center
