= Tibetan monasticism =

Destruction of Tibetan monasteries

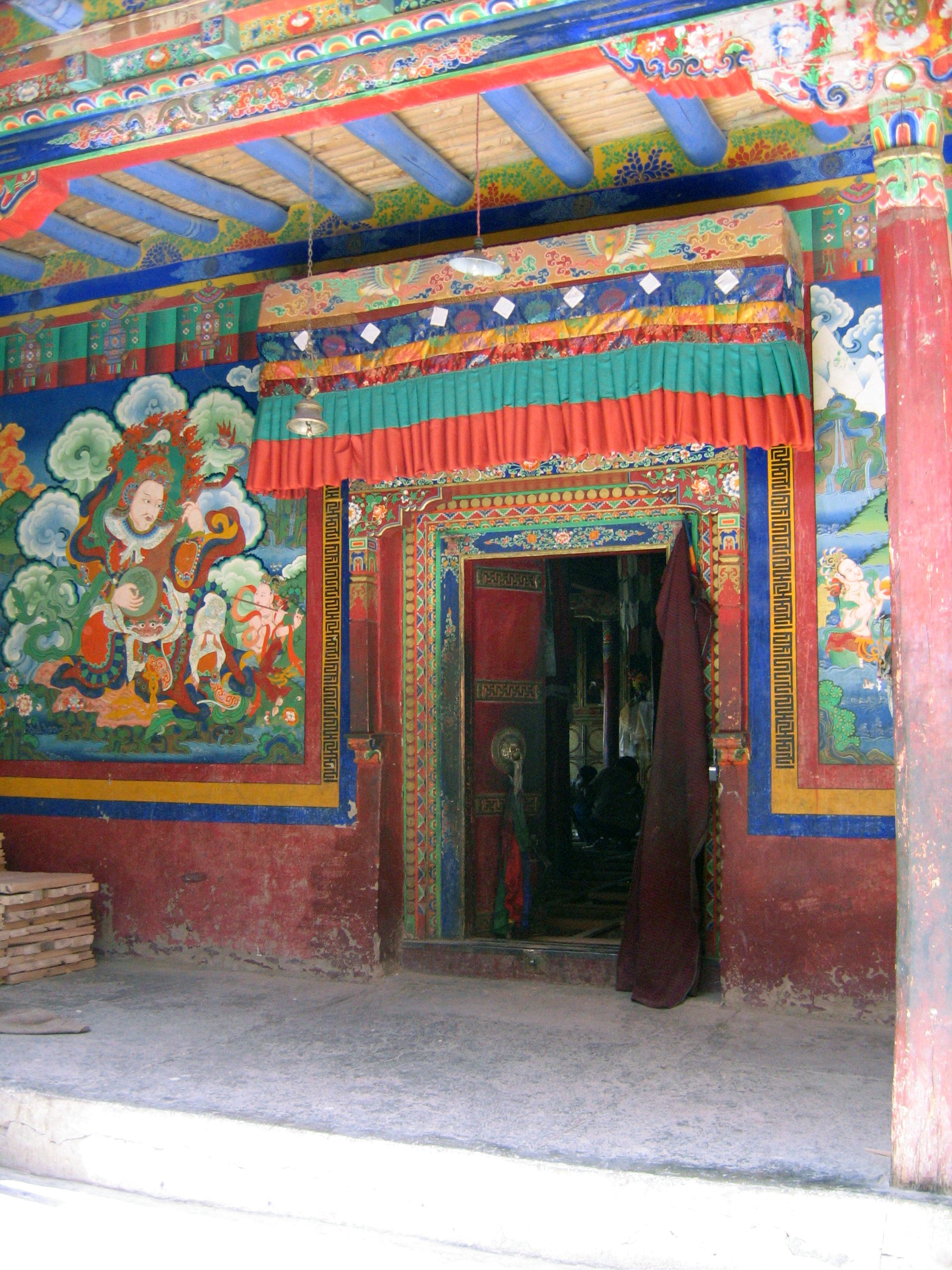
Lamayuru monastery

Although there were many householder-yogis in Tibet, monasticism was the foundation of Buddhism in Tibet. There were over 6,000 monasteries in Tibet. However, nearly all of these were ransacked and destroyed by Red Guards during the Cultural Revolution. Most of the major monasteries have been at least partially re-established, while many others remain in ruins.

Mongolian Buddhism derives from the Gelug school of Tibetan Buddhism. In Mongolia during the 1920s, approximately one third of males were monks, though many lived outside monasteries. By the beginning of the 20th century about 750 monasteries were functioning in Mongolia. These monasteries were largely dismantled during Communist rule, but many have been reestablished during the Buddhist revival in Mongolia which followed the fall of Communism.

Monasteries generally adhere to one particular school. Some of the major centers in each tradition are as follows:

Nyingma lineage is said to have "six mother monasteries" each of which has numerous associated branch monasteries:

- Mindrolling Monastery
- Katok Monastery
- Dorje Drak
- Dzogchen Monastery
- Palyul
- Shechen Monastery

Samye the first monastery in Tibet, established by Padmasambhāva and Śāntarakṣita was later taken over by the Sakya tradition.

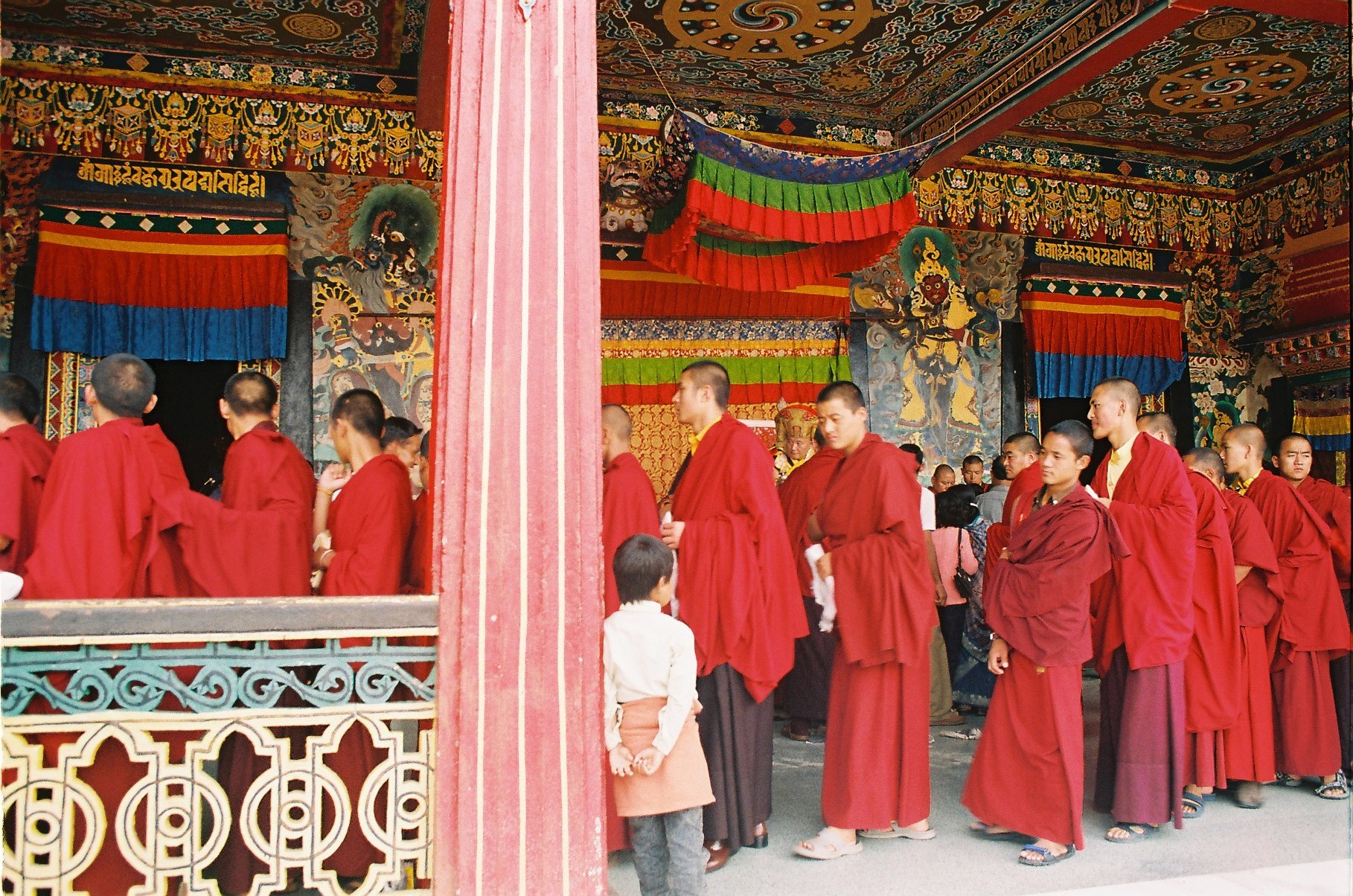
Tibetan Buddhist monks at Rumtek Monastery in Sikkim

Kagyu monasteries are mostly in Kham, eastern Tibet. Tsurphu and Ralung are in central Tibet:

- Drigung Monastery — the seat of the Könchog Tenzin Kunzang Thinley Lhundrub
- Palpung Monastery — the seat of the Tai Situpa and Jamgon Kongtrul
- Ralung Monastery — the seat of the Gyalwang Drukpa
- Surmang Monastery — the seat of the Trungpa tülkus
- Tsurphu Monastery — the seat of the Gyalwa Karmapa

Sakya monasteries:

- Ngor
- Sakya Monastery — the seat of the Sakya Trizin
- Shalu

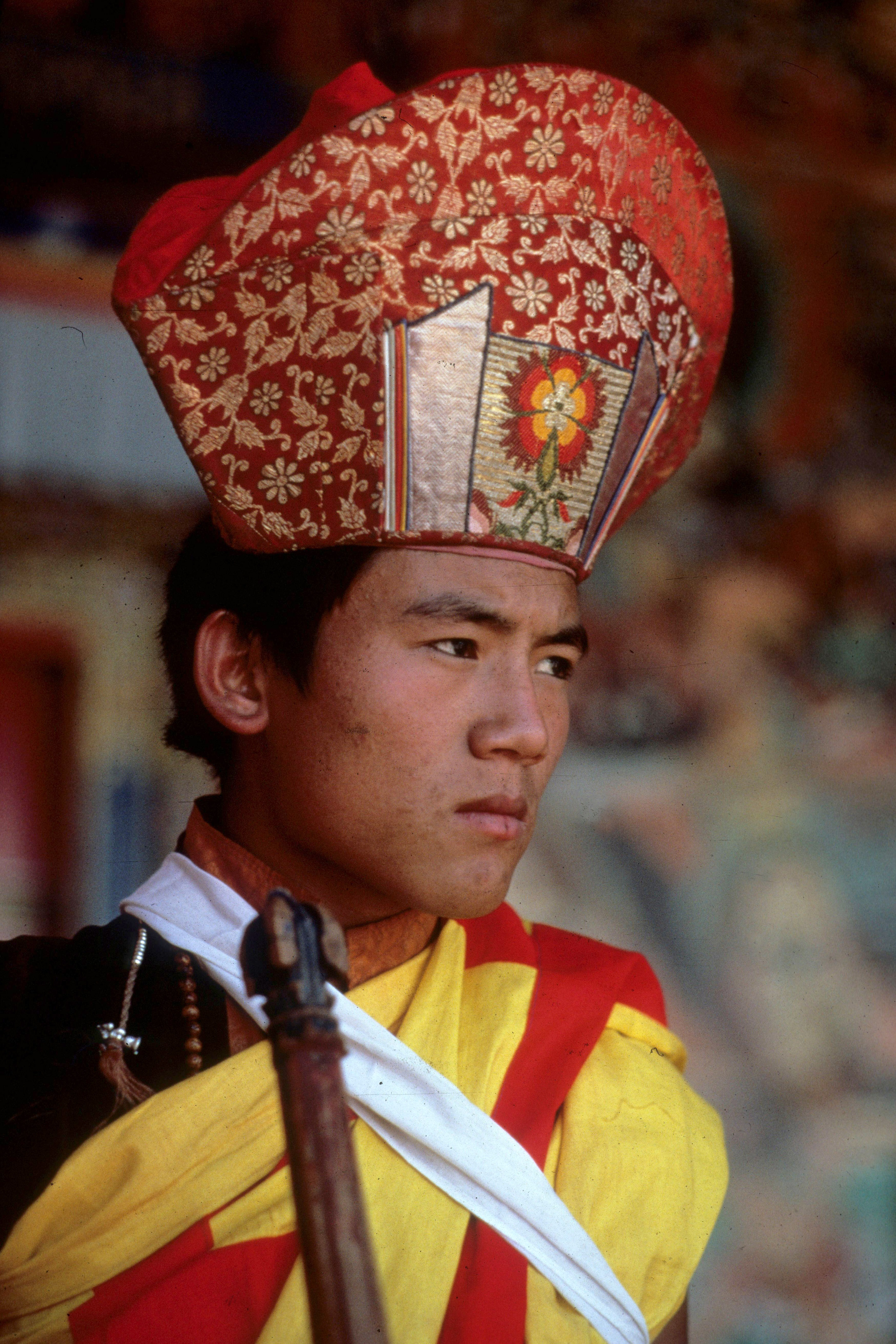
Young monk, Sikkim, India (1991)

Gelug first three centers are also called 'great three' and are near Lhasa:

- Drepung Monastery — the home monastery of the Dalai Lama
- Ganden Monastery — the seat of the Ganden Tripa
- Sera Monastery
- Tashilhunpo Monastery in Shigatse — founded by the first Dalai Lama, now the seat of the Panchen Lama

Jonang main centers of the more than 70 active monasteries:

- Takten Phuntsok Ling Monastery Shimla, gift from the Dalai Lama - seat of Khalkha Jetsun Dhampa Rinpoche
- Jonang Shimla Monastery - seat of Khenpo Choekyi Nangwa Rinpoche
- Tsangwa Monastery in Dzamthang is one of the largest with home to about 1,500 monks

Bön main two centers which has a Geshe program and its nunnery:

- Menri, re-founded in Himachal Pradesh - seat of the 33rd abbot Menri Trizin
- Triten Norbutse Monastery in Nepal
- The Redna Menling Nunnery

Other monasteries with particularly important regional influence:

- Mahayana Monastery — the seat of the Kadhampa Dharmaraja (The 25th Atisha Jiangqiu Tilei), Nepal
- Labrang Monastery in eastern Amdo
- Kumbum Jampaling in central Amdo
- Jokhang Temple in Lhasa — said to have been built by King Songtsen Gampo in 647 AD part of the UNESCO Tsangwa

== See also ==
- Deyangshar, the open courtyard of a Tibetan monastery
