= Lingdum Monastery =

Buddhist monastery near Ranka, Sikkim, North East India

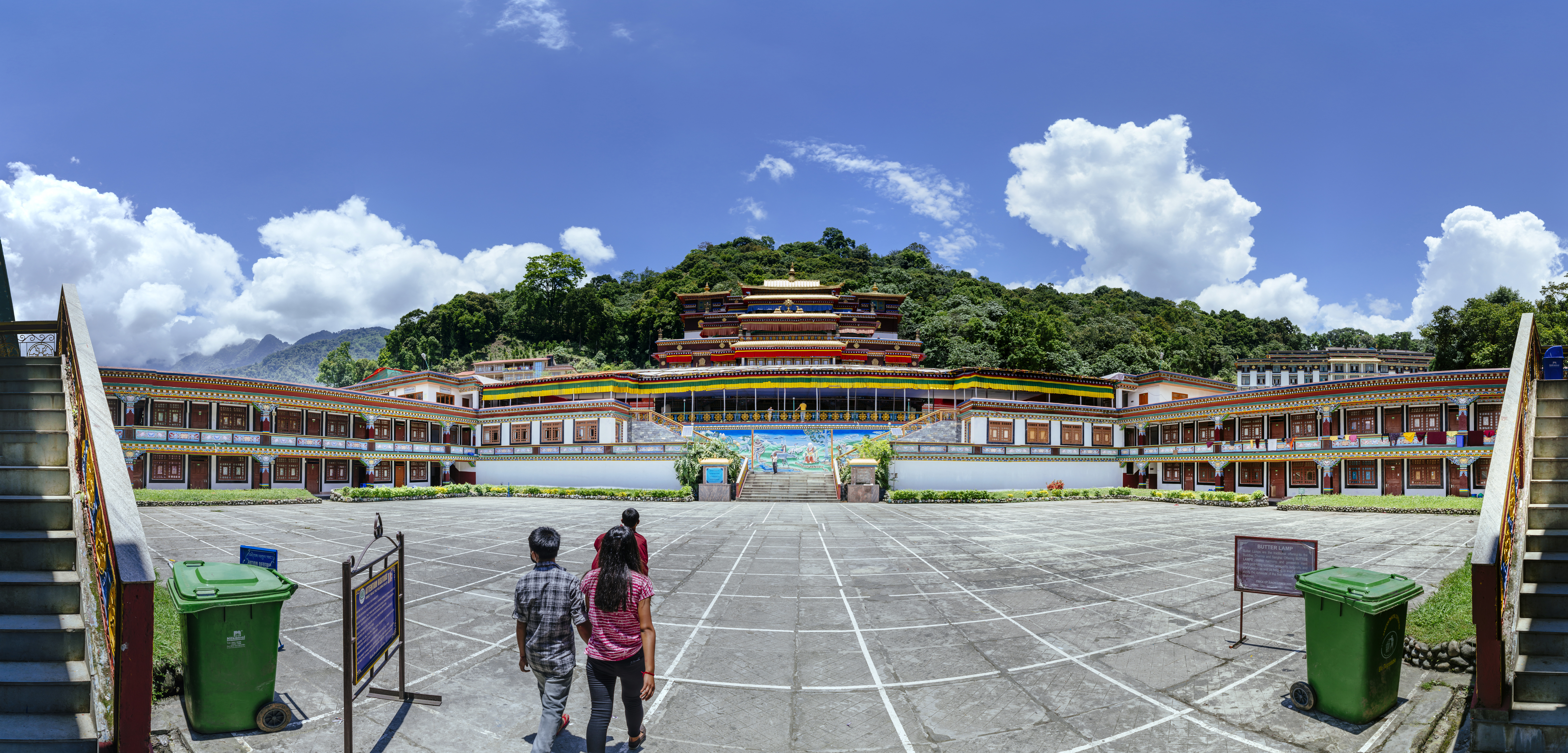

- Location within India

Religion
- Affiliation: Tibetan Buddhism
- Sect: Zurmang Kagyu
- Festival: Gutor
- Leadership: H. E. Zurmang Gharwang Rinpoche

Location
- Location: Sikkim, India
- Interactive map of Lingdum Monastery
- Coordinates: 27.330805°N 88.579484°E

Lingdum Monastery (also Ranka Lingdum or Pal Zurmang Kagyud Monastery) is a Buddhist monastery near Ranka in Sikkim, North East India, about an hour's drive from Gangtok. It was completed in 1999.

It follows the Zurmang Kagyu tradition.
