= Machik =

U.S-based organization centered on Tibet

Machik is a U.S.-based non-profit, non-governmental organization whose mission is to grow a global community committed to a stronger future for Tibet. Its work focuses primarily on civic engagement, gender equity and social innovation.

== Background ==
Machik was co-founded by Tibetan sisters Losang and Tashi Rabgey, two Ph.D.s who were raised in Canada. The group came about after they and their parents built the Ruth Walter Chungba Primary School in the rural village of Chungba, located in the mountains of the Kham region of Tibet. The bilingual school opened in 2002. The organisation has also developed the Chungba Middle School and supports students through high school and university. It also created programs to offer educational opportunities for Tibetan girls and women in the Amdo region and created the summer enrichment program for students from across Tibet. Other service projects have included bringing green energy and clean drinking water to a rural town, building a library in a town with high literacy but low access to materials, creating a greenhouse, repairing roads and houses, and participating in health care initiatives.

Losang and Tashi Rabgey were born in a Tibetan refugee settlement in India and later moved to Canada where they both graduated from the University of Toronto. Losang was the first Commonwealth Scholar of Tibetan descent and has a Ph.D. from the University of London's School of Oriental and African Studies and was named an explorer by both National Geographic and the Explorers Club. Tashi was the first Rhodes Scholar of Tibetan descent Her LLB is from Oxford University, her LLM is from Cambridge University and she has a Ph.D. from Harvard University. She is now a Research Professor of International Affairs at the Elliott School of International Affairs at George Washington University. She has published extensively on Tibet issues and continue to do research on the region.

== Work ==
The work of Machik has grown from its first school to include much broader initiatives. It has centered on community-based approaches and direct interventions. Machik centers the innovative and impactful capacity of change-makers inside Tibet and is a bridge between Tibetans in Tibet and the global. Current programs include Machik Weekend, Machik Khabda and Machik Gender Summit.

Machik has been able to achieve success in its programs without the political pitfalls that organisations have faced. Machik's staff speak both Mandarin Chinese and Tibetan, and its educational efforts in the U.S. emphasize an understanding of Tibet within the broader system of international affairs, including Chinese governance.
