= Zurmang Gharwang Rinpoche =

Tibetan Buddhist teacher

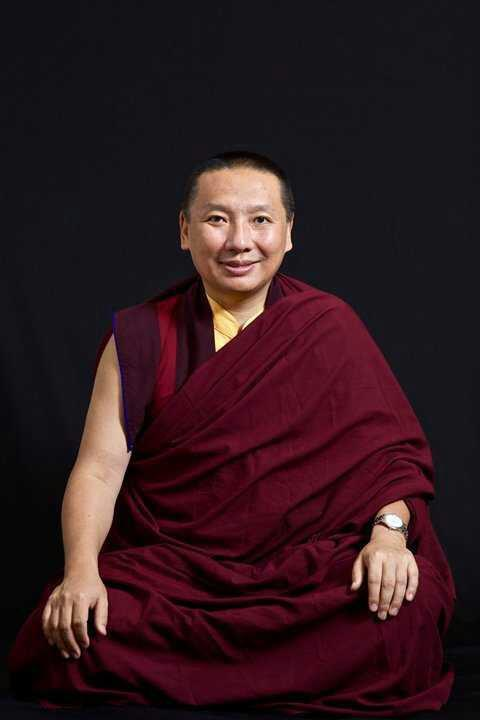
- H.E. the 12th Zurmang Gharwang Rinpoche

Tibetan name
- Tibetan: ཟུར་མང་གར་དབང་རིན་པོ་ཆེ་
Transcriptions
- Wylie: zur mang gar dbang rin po che

Prior to his birth on 30 June 1965, Zurmang Gharwang Rinpoche (Tibetan: ཟུར་མང་གར་དབང་རིན་པོ་ཆེ་, Wylie: zur mang gar dbang rin po che) was recognized by the 16th Karmapa, Rangjung Rigpe Dorje as the twelfth incarnation of the Gharwang Tulkus and as an emanation of Tilopa. He is the supreme lineage holder of the Zurmang Ear Whispered Lineage (zur mang snyan rgyud).

The unbroken line of the Gharwang Tulkus begins in the 14th century with the siddha Trung Mase, the first Gharwang Tulku and founder of the Zurmang Kagyu tradition and Zurmang Monastery. He was identified by the 5th Karmapa, Deshin Shekpa as the omniscient emanation of the Indian mahasiddha Tilopa. This was believed to be the fulfillment of Tilopa's prediction made after he received teachings directly from Vajrayogini in the Western land of Uddiyana, in which he had pledged to return to spread these teachings widely, after they had been transmitted through thirteen successive lineage holders. Before Tilopa's return this set of teachings was to be limited to a one-to-one transmission from each lineage holder to the next, and only upon Tilopa's later emanation as the first Gharwang Tulku were they opened up to a larger audience. These teachings form the core of the Zurmang Ear Whispered Lineage (zur mang snyan rgyud) also known as the Dakini Ear Whispered Lineage (mkha' 'gro snyan rgyud).

== Recognition ==
Rinpoche was born a prince of the Sikkimese Royal Court. His uncle, Palden Thondup Namgyal, was then the reigning King of Sikkim. However, even before his birth the 16th Karmapa identified him as the 12th Zurmang Gharwang. The 16th Karmapa, who had alluded to his attendants that the next incarnation of Zurmang Gharwang would soon occur, was attending a performance of traditional Tibetan Dharma on the forecourt of Rumtek Monastery. During the Tilopa dance, a Jewel offering was made by the Karmapa's General Secretary, Damchoe Yongdu, to the Karmapa, and breaking with tradition, instead of accepting it himself he directed that the gift be given to the Gharwang Tulku. So saying, he pointed to the surprised mother-to-be and announced that she was carrying the 12th Gharwang Rinpoche.

A few months later, the Royal Princess delivered her predicted son at her residence in Gangtok. At dawn Rinpoche's parents had dispatched a messenger to go to Rumtek 24km away to inform the Karmapa of the new arrival. However, before the messenger could leave the house, Saljay Rinpoche, the Karmapa's emissary, with a party of monks was already at the door, bearing gifts and a letter containing the Karmapa's blessings for the newborn child. At the time the new tulku was born, the mother of the previous Gharwang, living in Tibet, was heard joyously announcing that, "Rinpoche had returned. He is born in a warm country where fruits and flowers grow in abundance, and in the midst of bird song."

== Enthronement ==
In 1976, shortly after his eleventh birthday, Gharwang Rinpoche was installed on the Lion Throne as the 12th Zurmang Gharwang. The ceremony took place in the Assembly Hall of the Dharma Chakra Center in the presence of the 16th Karmapa. It was attended by many incarnate tulkus, monks, and state dignitaries. Hundreds of well-wishers and devotees came to witness the event. During the ceremonial installation, the Karmapa gave Gharwang Rinpoche his name, "Karma Gharwang Chochung Tenpa Namgyal Thinley Kunkhyab Pal Zangpo," which means The Victorious Protector of Buddha Dharma With Excellent Qualities and All-Pervasive, Auspicious Activities. The Karmapa also predicted the founding of a new Zurmang Kagyu monastery outside Tibet which would become an important center for the teaching and practice of the Buddha Dharma.

== Education ==
In the years following his enthronement, Gharwang Rinpoche received many personal empowerments, textual transmissions, as well as oral instructions directly from his root lama, the 16th Karmapa. After Karmapa died, Gharwang Rinpoche studied at the Nalanda Buddhist Institute between 1981 and 1991, and graduated as the top student in the year of 1991.

Among his teachers were Kalu Rinpoche, Jamgon Kongtrul Rinpoche, Tulku Urgyen Rinpoche, Khenchen Pema Pedtse Rinpoche, Shamarpa, Situpa, and Gyaltsapa, and Buddhist scholars such as Thrangu Rinpoche, Tsultrim Gyamtso, Khenchen Chodak Tenphel, Khenpo Chokden, and Khenpo Tenzin Phuntsok.

== Activities ==
In 1987, while still an undergraduate, Gharwang Rinpoche began his teaching career at the Nalanda Buddhist Institute. Since then, he has taught extensively in dharma centers all over the world, in Europe, America, as well as in Asia. Zurmang centers can now be found in Singapore, Hong Kong, Indonesia, and Malaysia.

In 1990, Tom Bradley, the mayor of Los Angeles honored him with the key to the city, making him an honorary citizen of the US.

In August 1991 Gharwang Rinpoche returned for the first time to his original Seat in Zurmang Kham, (Qinghai province). He personally blessed the many people who came to greet him, and presented gifts to the people of Qinghai, including a towering gold-plated Buddha 15 feet high, a golden dharma wheel flanked by two listening deer, and a khengere (a bell-shaped object symbolizing the ever flourishing dharma, which is traditionally placed on the roof of a monastery). He encouraged and contributed to welfare projects throughout the region. In the same year, Rinpoche established the Zurmang Kagyu Buddhist Foundation. He initiated many community projects such as the construction of roads, schools, medical dispensaries, orphanages, and homes for the elderly.

In 1992 Gharwang Rinpoche commenced the construction of a new Seat for the Zurmang Kagyu Tradition in Lingdum, Sikkim. The site covers approximately 21 acres of forested slope on the same hill occupied by Rumtek. In under four years, he built a monastic complex, fulfilling the prediction of the 16th Karmapa of a new Zurmang Kagyu monastery outside Tibet.
