= Lodrö Chökyi Nyima =

Tibetan tulku

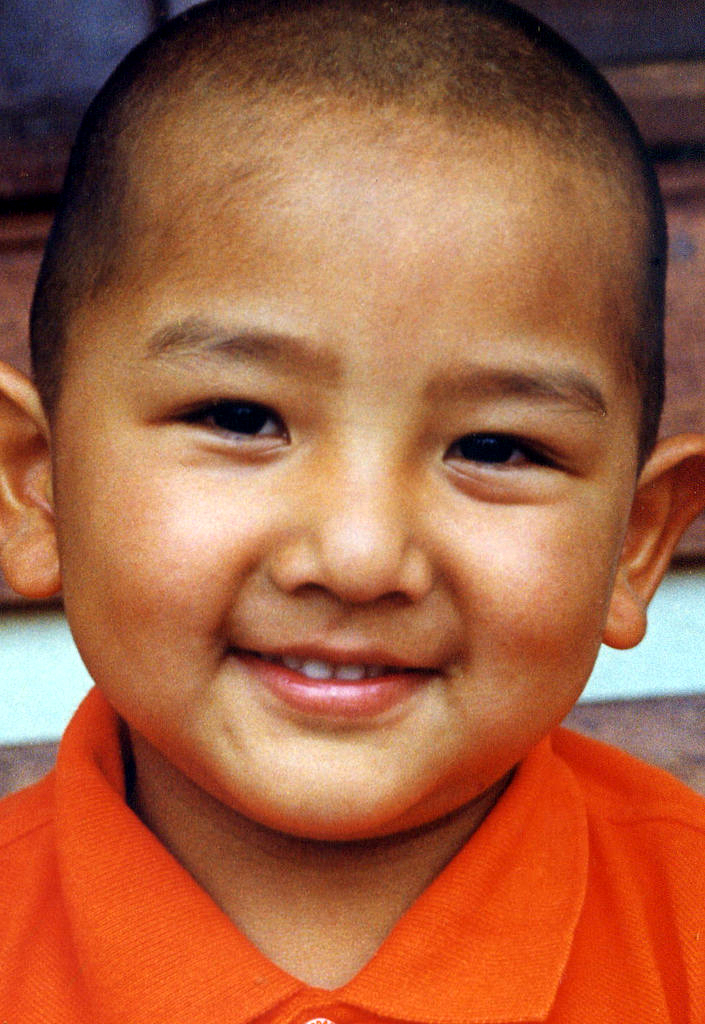
Jongun Kongtrul.jpg

Lodrö Chökyi Nyima is a Tibetan tulku. He was recognized as the 4th reincarnation of the Jamgon Kongtrul in August 1996 by Ogyen Trinley Dorje, the 17th Karmapa, who gave the name Jamgon Lodro Chokyi Nyima Dronme Chok Thamced Le Nampar Gyalwe De. He was born on November 26, 1995 in Chushur Dzong, near Chushur Dzong, in Central Tibet. This recognition was confirmed by the 14th Dalai Lama, Sakya Trizin, the head of the Sakya school of Tibetan Buddhism, and Mindroling Trichen, the now deceased head of the Nyingma tradition. All three performed hair-cutting ceremonies and bestowed names, as is traditional. As the reincarnation of Jamgon Kongtrul, Lodrö is entitled to be styled "Rinpoche".

His parents brought him to India from Tibet in 1997 when he was only two years old, because they feared "political misconceptions of the Chinese Government" after the 14th Dalai Lama officially recognized him as the 4th reincarnation of Jamgon Kongtrul. He was supported by the monks of the monastery of Rumtek in Sikkim and adopted by a couple of Tibetan origin living nearby, with the agreement of the Central Tibetan Administration. Since then, he has lived in India as an Indian citizen. A passport was granted to him in 2006, allowing his travel to the United States that year. However, in 2007, the Indian Ministry of Home Affairs sent a letter to the child and to his adoptive mother Kunzang L Chungyalpa, informing them that the passport was revoked because he had entered illegally in India, challenging his Indian citizenship. In late October 2013, the Delhi High Court issued a notice until the next hearing date in December, opposing Lodrö's expulsion to Tibet, in China, where his life is threatened.

On April 14, 2016, he renounced his monk's vows in an official statement and through social media, stating that he wanted to become a doctor.

== Sources ==
- Tomlin, Adele (30 November 2019). "Kālacakra and the 3rd Jamgon Kongtrul: a stunning record of empowerment and teaching". Dakini Translations and Publications.
