= Western tulku =

Western-born Tibetan Buddhist master

A Western tulku is a recognized reincarnation of a previous master, born in the West, commonly of non-Tibetan ethnic heritage, but also expatriate Tibetans born in the West or Westerners with heritage from the Tibetan cultural sphere (e.g. Mongolia). The recognition of Westerners as tulku has occurred since the 1970s, following the spread of Tibetan Buddhism to modern Western countries such as the United States.

Western, especially non-Asian, tulku have prompted debate in Buddhist circles and the wider Tibetan communities, variously being interpreted as outgrowths of orientalism, or part of Tibetan Buddhism adapting to a global, transcultural political context.

== History and development ==
=== Background ===
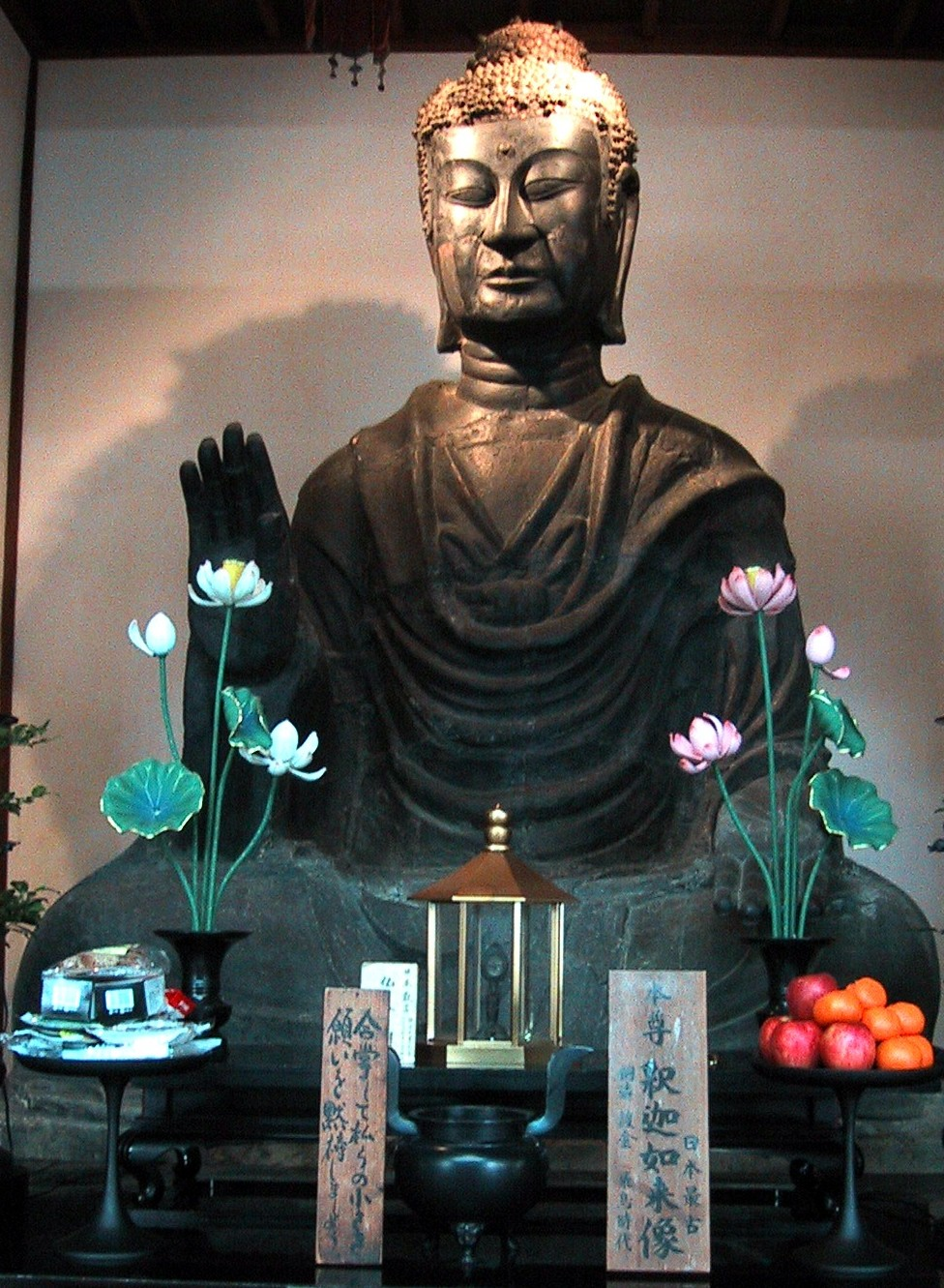
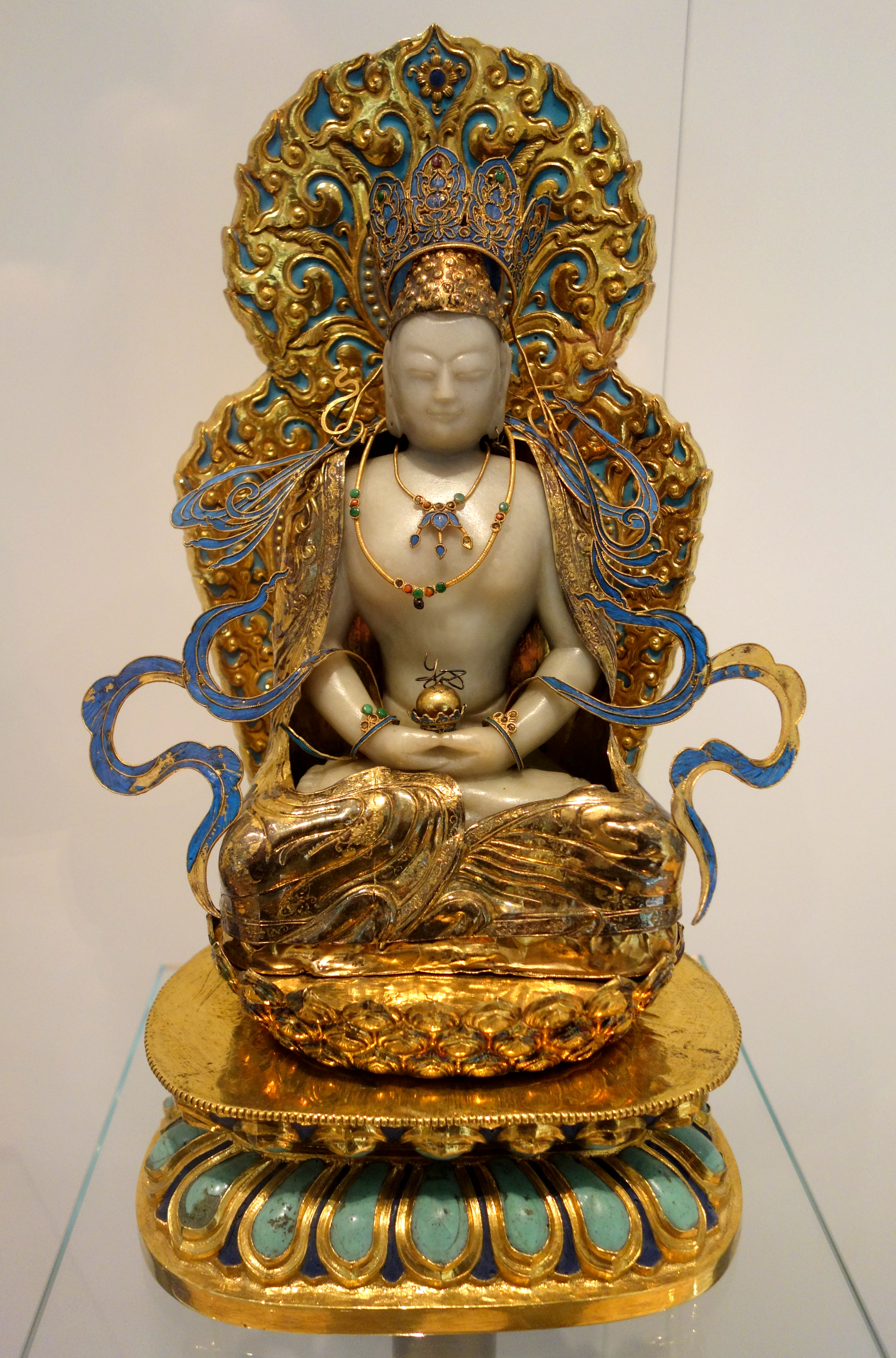
In Shingon, the Japanese transmission of Vajrayana Buddhism, Siddhartha Gautama (left) is held to be the nirmāṇakāya (Tib. tulku) of the cosmic Vairochana (right).

The term "tulku" in Tibetan Buddhism corresponds to the Sanskrit "nirmāṇakāya" and represents the physical form in which a Buddha appears to ordinary beings. A related concept, "yangsi," denotes an enlightened master who has returned to earthly existence for the benefit of sentient beings. The tulku system emerged during a historical period marked by a political vacuum in Tibet following the assassination of Ralpachen. Initially rooted in political and mercantile motives, it later acquired significant spiritual significance.

Despite its political origins, the tulku system possesses essential ideological and religious dimensions, deeply connected to the bodhisattva concept. Tulkus have traditionally been associated with ruling power in Tibetan society, supplanting earlier systems of monastic governance. Foreign tulkus have been identified since at least the sixteenth century, when the grandson of the Mongol Altan Khan was recognized as the 4th Dalai Lama.

=== Western interest and globalization ===
In the late 19th century, Laurence Waddell, an early Western explorer, dated the tulku system to a purely Tibetan innovation in the fifteenth century, although "purposefully obscured so as to give the appearance of antiquity", and distinguished it from the "orthodox Buddhist theory of rebirth as the result of karma." Such opinions are typical of orientalist writers who are averse to perceived superstition, seen as an aberration on an originally rationalist tradition. Giuseppe Tucci traced the origin of tulku to Indian Vajrayana, particularly in a fragmentary biography of Maitripada he discovered in Nepal.

The Chinese annexation of Tibet in 1959 created massive social upheaval. This intensified during the Cultural Revolution which brought irreparable damage to the institutions and traditions which constitute Tibetan Buddhism as one of the Four Olds. As a result, Tibetan Buddhism has flourished in areas of Tibetan culture not under Chinese rule, such as Nepal, Bhutan, and parts of North India. In India, the traditional monastic system is largely intact and the tulku system remains politically relevant. Compounded with the inherent transnational character of proselytizing religions, Tibetan Buddhism is "pulled between the need to adapt itself and the need to preserve itself" in the face of Chinese occupation and Western fascination with Tibet (cf. Shangri-La).

The mass exodus of Tibetans following the failed 1959 uprising led Tibetan refugees to search for reincarnate masters outside of Tibet. The first Western tulku were expatriate Tibetans, Tibetans of mixed heritage, or members of related ethnic groups, such as Erdne Ombadykow (Kalmyk) or the sons of Chögyam Trungpa (Mongol-Tibetan and English-Tibetan).

Native Westerners began converting to Tibetan Buddhism during the counterculture of the 1960s, and Tibetan Buddhism became popular among "elite" western Buddhists and they began to be recognized as incarnations of Buddhist masters around this time. The first recognized white tulku was Dylan Henderson, an American boy identified as his father's teacher, or alternatively Ossian MacLise (born in Kathmandu, Nepal). Initially, white Western tulkus were not recognized by the wider Tibetan diaspora.

== Notable examples ==
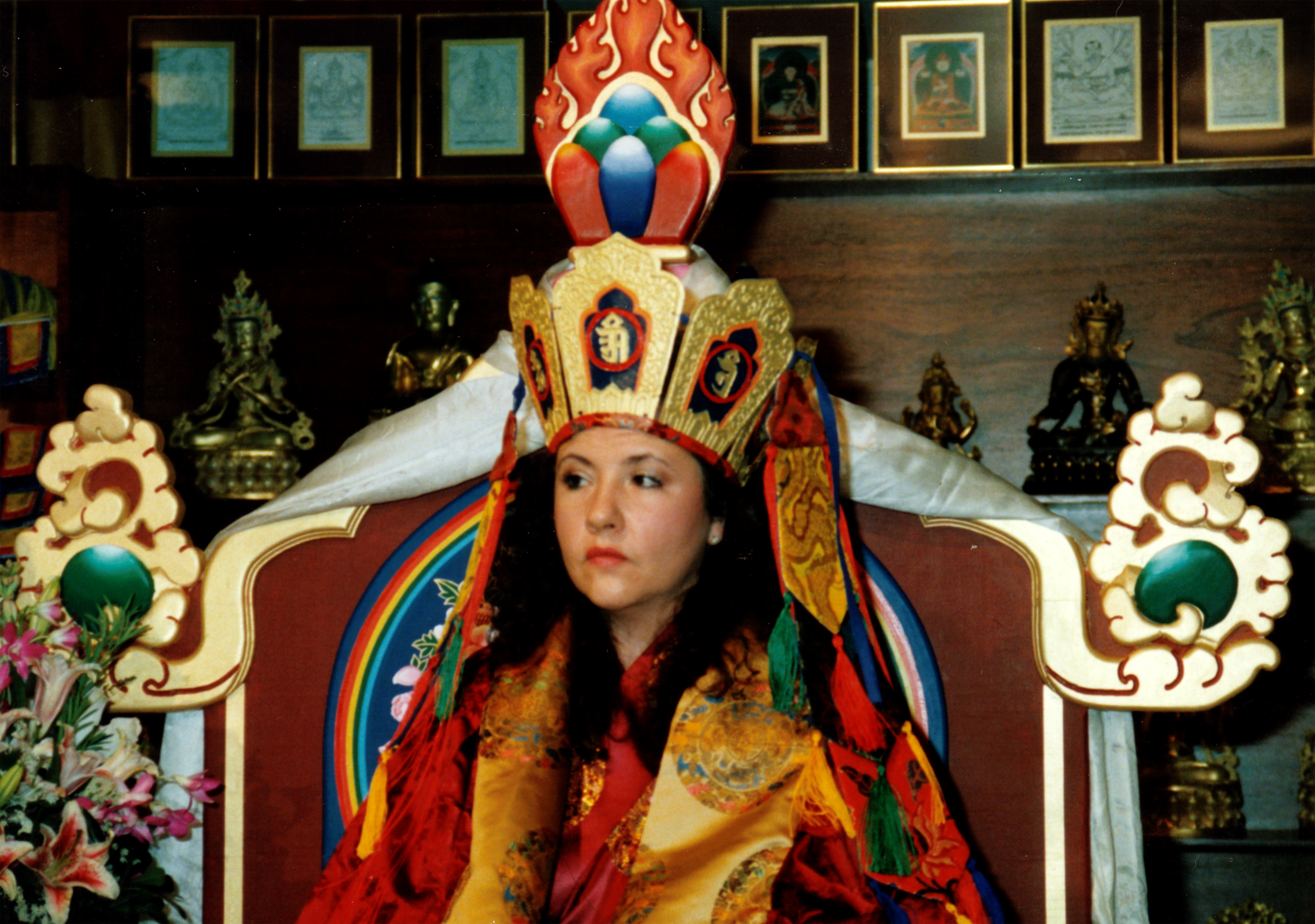
Western tulku Jetsunma Ahkon Lhamo, born Alyce Louise Zeoli, during her enthronement as a Dakini

Elijah Ary was the first Westerner to be recognized as a tulku in Gelug tradition. Tenzin Ösel Hita was born to Spanish parents, both students at the Foundation for the Preservation of the Mahayana Tradition, in February 1985. He was confirmed as the reincarnate Thubten Yeshe, founder of the FPMT, by the Dalai Lama in 1986. Hita has been called a "transnational tulku".

In 1988, Jetsunma Ahkon Lhamo (formerly Catharine Burroughs) was enthroned as a tulku at Kunzang Palyul Choling. This marked the first time a Western woman was recognized as a tulku. Her late recognition and non-traditional lifestyle roused controversy.

Steven Seagal was enthroned as tulku of Chungdrag Dorje, a 17th-century tertön or "treasure revealer", in February 1997. This prompted a debate as to whether traditional religious titles "have been put up for sale." Penor Rinpoche, who has recognized several Western tulku including Ahkon Norbu Lhamo, defended his recognition of Seagal, arguing that it was not uncommon to recognize tulku late in life or for there to exist large gaps between incarnations of a tulku. He denied seeking monetary donations from Seagal. Stephen Batchelor wrote that "my suspicion, and I must admit it's a cynical one, is that this is a political-financial move." Seagal is involved in the international arms trade and the government of Russia, which has prompted criticism of his title by English journalist Marina Hyde.

== Acceptance ==
Western tulkus may struggle to gain acceptance among laypeople and even other monastics. Furthermore, a Western child identified as a tulku is compared to and made to identify with an adult of a completely different culture and historical setting. The Tibetologist and tulku Elijah Ary noted that "the two terms are antithetical" for many Tibetans. Many Western tulku feel "their place still lies in the West." Generally, they do not follow traditional Tibetan monastic life, and commonly leave their home monasteries for alternative careers, sometimes outside of chaplaincy or other spiritual roles, however this is a trend seen in Tibetan tulku as well. In Western Buddhist communities, there is significantly more emphasis on laity, a greater participation of women, and a general orientation towards social justice than is seen in traditional Buddhist communities. Ary suggests that the paths of Western tulku "lie outside of the monastery" and that through this they "[fulfil] part of [their] calling as Tulkus."

Tulku Bino Naksang has described the phenomena of Western tulkus as a "failed experiment" which did not account for the contradictions between traditional Tibetan culture and modern Western culture, maintaining that the tulku system is uniquely Tibetan. He has suggested that Westerners should develop their own forms of Buddhism rather than adapt to the Tibetan system. The current Dalai Lama is uncertain whether the recognition of Western tulku is beneficial.

== Analysis and academic responses ==
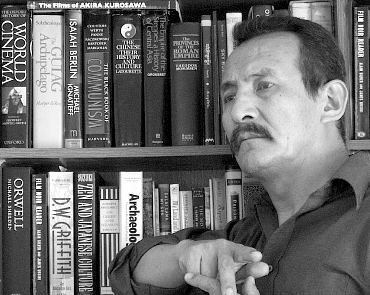
Jamyan Norbu has been described as practicing a form of "counter-appropriation" in his novel The Mandala of Sherlock Holmes

Elijah Ary has argued that the recognition of Western tulku is evidence that the wider tulku system is not entirely sociopolitical. The identification of non-Tibetan tulku has been called a manifestation of "the creative potential of Tibetan people [...] to adjust and survive in a changing world" and seen as an indications that Tibetan Buddhism is acquiring a more "globalized" character, as the tulku system is important to the maintenance and transmission of Tibetan Buddhism. Raymond Lee and Susan Ackerman argue that the recognition of Western tulkus "enhances the image of the Tibetan hierocracy as being open to change", occurring in a critical moment and "market-like situation that thrives on syncretic ideas and practices." Donald Lopez suggests that the recognition of Western tulkus is "a form of spiritual adaptation that Tibetans use to gain allegiance from Western countries in order to strengthen their protest against China's occupation."

The academic Abraham Zablocki uses the term "tulku envy" to describe a Western desire to "be[come] Tibetan" or inhabit a Tibetan body through the tulku system, where the prospective of a unique, subjectively exotic identity can be ego-aggrandizing, holding that the desire to trade one's Western-ness for an idealized image of Tibetan-ness is essentially cultural-appropriative:

The longing for a Tibetan body, or more precisely, the longing to discover that one's Western body is actually a vessel holding a Tibetan identity, reveals something of the symbolic potency that Tibetan-ness continues to hold for so many in the West.

Zablocki analyzes The Mandala of Sherlock Holmes, by the Tibetan activist and writer Jamyang Norbu, as a satire of this tulku envy, in an act of "counter-appropriation" in which a Western culture heroes becomes a Tibetan rather than vice-versa. Norbu himself is critical of the place of Buddhism in the Tibetan exile community, as well as the "whimsies of western dharma-types, enamoured with everything 'traditional' or 'mystical' in Tibet."

== See also ==
- Buddhism in the West
- Cultural appropriation
- Tibetan diaspora
