= Trungram Gyalwa Rinpoche =

Tibetan rinpoche

Trungram Gyalwa
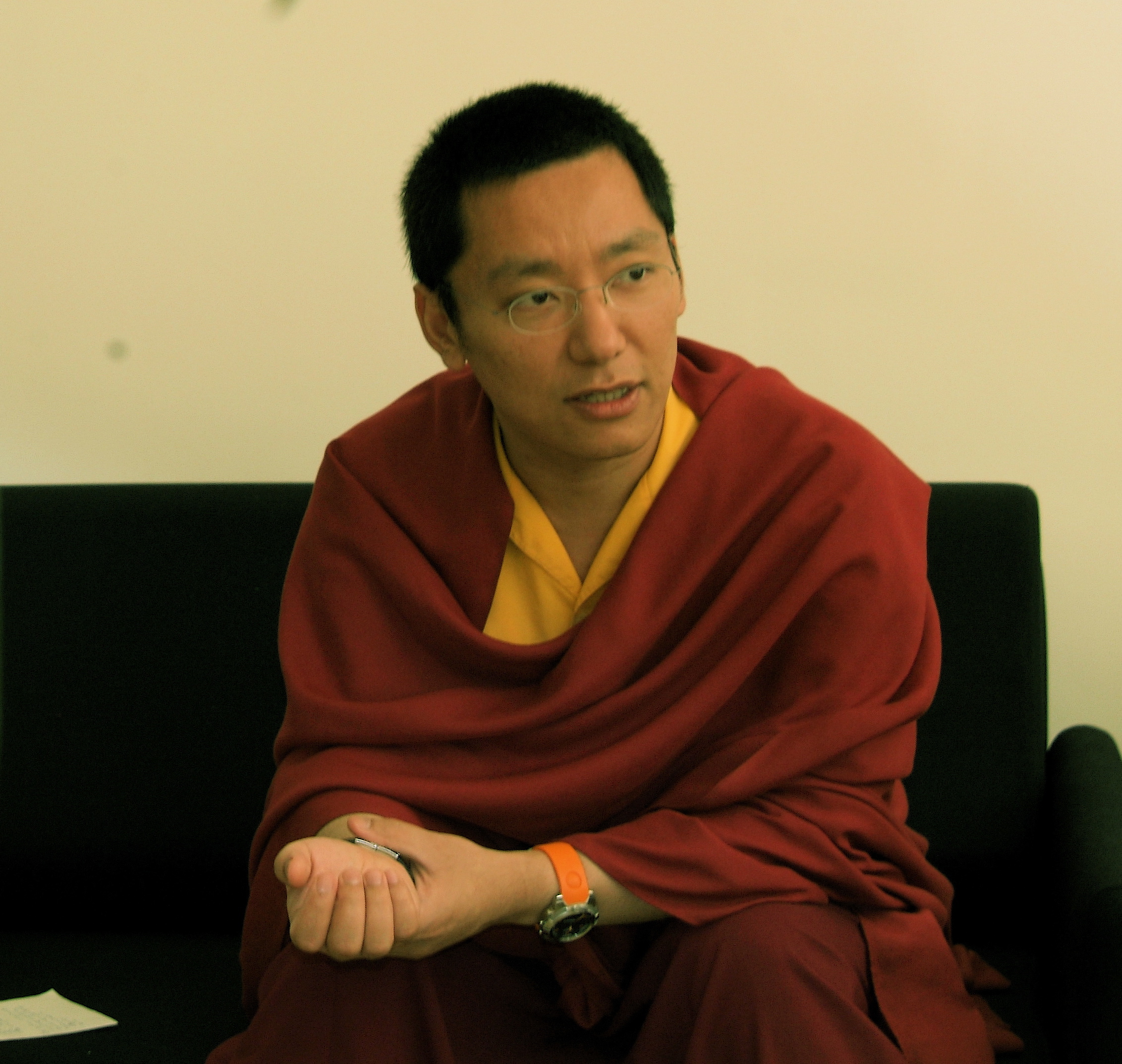
- Gyalwa in 2005
- Title: Rinpoche

Personal life
- Born: Nepal
- Website: dharmakaya.org

Religious life
- Religion: Tibetan Buddhism
- School: Kagyu, Nyingma, Rimé

Senior posting
- Reincarnation: Gotsa Gyalwa Luntok Thrinlay (1894-1959)

Trungram Gyalwa Rinpoche (Trungram Gyaltrul Rinpoche) is the head of the Trungram descent, and one of the highest tulkus of the Kagyu lineage of Tibetan Buddhism. He has received extensive transmissions of the Nyingma ancestry, and teaches in the spirit of the nonsectarian Rimé movement. He is also the first incarnate lama to earn a Ph.D. in the West, having completed a doctoral program in Indo-Tibetan Buddhist Studies at Harvard University. Gyalwa has founded organizations throughout Asia and United States which aims to modernize ancient Buddhist teachings.

Born into a Nepalese Sherpa family, Gyalwa was recognized by Rangjung Rigpe Dorje, 16th Karmapa as the Fourth Trungram Gyalwa Rinpoche, the reincarnation of the third Trungram Gyalwa.

== Birth and recognition ==
Trungram Gyalwa was born into a Nepalese Sherpa family.

Some accounts speculate that Trungram Gyalwa had a transparent abdomen as an infant, which eventually led his parents to take him to seek out the 16th Karmapa, supreme head of the Kagyu lineage. According to accounts shared by some spiritual center, in a public audience, before his parents had a chance to speak with the Karmapa, the 16th Karmapa recognized the child on sight as the “intentionally reborn” manifestation (tulku) of the third Trungram Gyalwa. The 16th Karmapa explained Trungram Gyalwa's marking as a symbol of his predecessor's realization of Mahamudra practice.

Some sources state that the 16th Karmapa proclaimed the boy as the 4th Trungram Gyalwa, with the formal name of “Trungram Gyalwa Tulku Karma Tenpai Gyaltsen Trinlay Kunkhyab Pal Sangpo", and bestowed him with dharma robes. He gave Gyalwa Buddhist refuge vows and wrote a long-life prayer for him. Trungram Gyalwa was enthroned at Rumtek Monastery, the main seat of the Karmapa, in Sikkim, India.

=== Names ===
Gyalwa Trulku was the personal name of the first incarnation of the Trungram Gyalwa lineage. The term "Trulku" refers to incarnation. Since the first Trungram Gyalwa belonged to the Trungram teaching lineage and was highly respected, his full name was Trungram Gyalwa Trulku Rinpoche. However, he often used "Gyaltrul," the shortened form of "Gyalwa Trulku," making his name Trungram Gyaltrul Rinpoche.

The 4th Trungram Gyalwa Rinpoche is also known as Trungram Gyaltrul Rinpoche, and, to a lesser degree, Drungram Gyaltrul, Tenpai Gyaltsen, Gyalwa Lama, and Gyalwa Trulku. He himself prefers to write Trungram Gyalwa, although his official name is either H.E. Trungram Gyalwa Rinpoche or H.E. Trungram Gyaltrul Rinpoche. In the West, he often uses Trungram Gyalwa Rinpoche, PhD; worldwide, his students simply call him Rinpoche.

== Education ==
=== Early years in Rumtek ===
Trungram Gyalwa's studies began at Rumtek Monastery at age three. There he received a traditional monastic education, followed by studies on Tibetan and Buddhist literature and philosophy at Jamyang Khang school. He took the vows of a novice monk (getsul), but did not later take full ordination, and returned his novice vows before attending university.

=== Nalanda ===
Trungram Gyalwa entered the Karma Shri Nalanda Institute for Higher Buddhist Studies in Rumtek, where he studied the traditional fields of Buddhist philosophy, logic, epistemology, soteriology, cosmology, codes, debates, history, poetry, Sanskrit, literature, medicine, and meditation. During his time at Nalanda, he, with others, helped to set up and run the Students' Welfare Union of Nalanda. He also served as one of the three main teaching assistants of Nalanda Institute.

He earned the title of Ka-rabjampa ("one with unobstructed knowledge of scriptures") from Nalanda, and also received the degree of Acharya, or Master of Buddhist Philosophy, with First Class Honors from Sampurnanant Sanskrit University, in Varanasi, India.

=== Teachings from all traditions ===
Reflecting the non-sectarian approach of his predecessor, Trungram Gyalwa's teachers come from all four main schools of Tibetan Buddhism (Nyingma, Kagyu, Sakya, Geluk). He studied with some of the most prominent masters of recent years, including the 16th Karmapa and Dilgo Khyentse Rinpoche. He received most of his teachings and empowerments from these two Rinpoches and from Khenchen Trinley Paljor Rinpoche (appointed by the 16th Karmapa to be Trungram Gyalwa's tutor). His other Buddhist teachers include Sakya Trizin, the late Ugyen Tulku Rinpoche, the late Khamtrul Rinpoche, Trulshik Rinpoche, the late Kalu Rinpoche, the late Salje Rinpoche and the late Gendun Rinpoche. He studied extensively under Khenpo Tsultrim Gyamtso Rinpoche and Khenpo Choedrak Rinpoche.

Trungram Gyalwa earned his Ph.D from Harvard University in 2004.

=== Further studies ===
Besides traditional Buddhist education, Trungram Gyalwa studied liberal arts at Kirkwood College in Iowa, U.S.A., and later at Newbury College in Massachusetts, U.S.A. He worked with Professor Donald Lopez as a visiting scholar at the University of Michigan, and was involved in a teaching exchange program and sutra translation there.

Later, he studied Chinese for six months in Taiwan at the Language Learning Center of National Taiwan Normal University. He is fluent in Tibetan, English, Nepali, Sherpa, Chinese, and has a good knowledge of Sanskrit, Hindi and French.

=== Harvard Ph.D. ===
Trungram Gyalwa entered the Harvard Graduate School of Arts and Sciences as a doctoral student in the Department of Sanskrit and Indian Studies. His concentration was on Indo-Tibetan Buddhist Studies with special emphasis on comparative studies. He was awarded a Ph.D. in 2004, with a dissertation on Gampopa, the most prominent disciple of Milarepa, focusing on Gampopa's seminal role in the development of the Kagyu School of Tibetan Buddhism.

== Worldwide activities ==
=== Traditional teachings ===
Trungram Gyalwa gave his first public teaching as a young boy to visitors from European countries. He taught the essence of Naropa's Mahamudra and the practice of Avalokiteshvara. The next year he gave a teaching on the 37 practices of Bodhisattvas to the monks of Rumtek, praised by all the khenpos and rinpoches present. Soon after, he performed his first initiation, transmitting the essence of the Kagyupa Long Life Buddha practice.

Trungram Gyalwa has given teachings and initiations and helped create groups and centers for Buddhist studies in many countries, including Australia, Austria, Belgium, Bhutan, Canada, China, the Czech Republic, Denmark, France, Germany, Greece, Hong Kong, India, Indonesia, Japan, Macau, Malaysia, the Netherlands, the Philippines, Poland, Singapore, Sweden, Taiwan and the United States.

=== Academic teachings ===
In 2016, Trungram Gyalwa returned to academia, serving as the Numata Visiting Professor at McGill University, where he taught a course in Issues in Buddhist Studies.

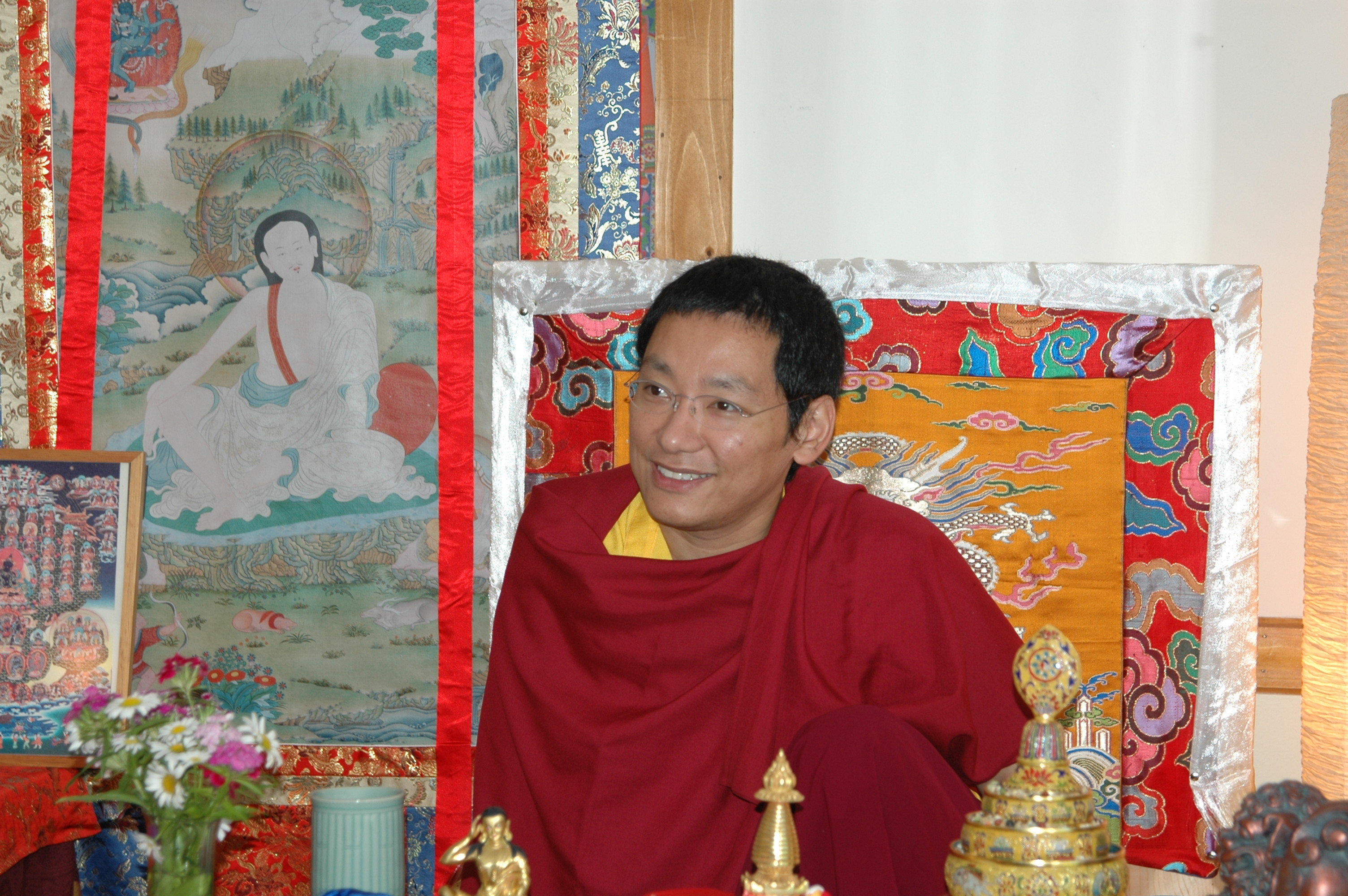
Teaching in Cochecton, New York

=== Preserving practice lineages ===
When Trungram Gyalwa visited the Trungram Monastery in Tibet and the nearby cave where the 3rd Trungram Gyalwa had practiced, he met with thousands of disciples of his prior incarnation. During this visit, he took measures to preserve the Nyengyu tradition - a special oral lineage of Trungram Monastery that was down to only a few transmission holders at that time.

For three years, Trungram Gyalwa served as the President of Dharmodaya, the National Buddhist Association of Nepal. In that capacity, he represented Nepal at the 1998 International Buddhist Conference near Sydney, Australia. He is a lifetime advisor to the organization.

=== Teaching wellbeing ===
In 2004, with his support, monks of the Trungram tradition founded Dharmakaya, a US-based Buddhist church, to preserve and share the wisdom teachings.

In 2017, an affiliated center opened, named the Dharmakaya Center for Wellbeing, in Cragsmoor, New York, offering long- and short-term retreats and the study of Dharma.

=== Philanthropic activities ===
Early on, Trungram Gyalwa founded the United Trungram Buddhist Foundation, first in Nepal, followed by several other countries, and later, the United Trungram Buddhist Fellowship (UTBF). These organizations purport to share three goals: To preserve the wisdom teachings; to be a vehicle for educational activities; and to help those who most need it, with special emphasis on supporting disadvantaged children in Nepal and other underdeveloped countries.

After the 2015 earthquake which hit Nepal, Trungram Gyalwa immediately organized aid for the villagers of Barpak VDC, Gorkha, the epicenter of the earthquake, providing food, medicine and temporary shelters. He then founded Buddhist Relief Services, with a mission to bring relief to the victims of disaster.

=== Promoting peace and unity ===
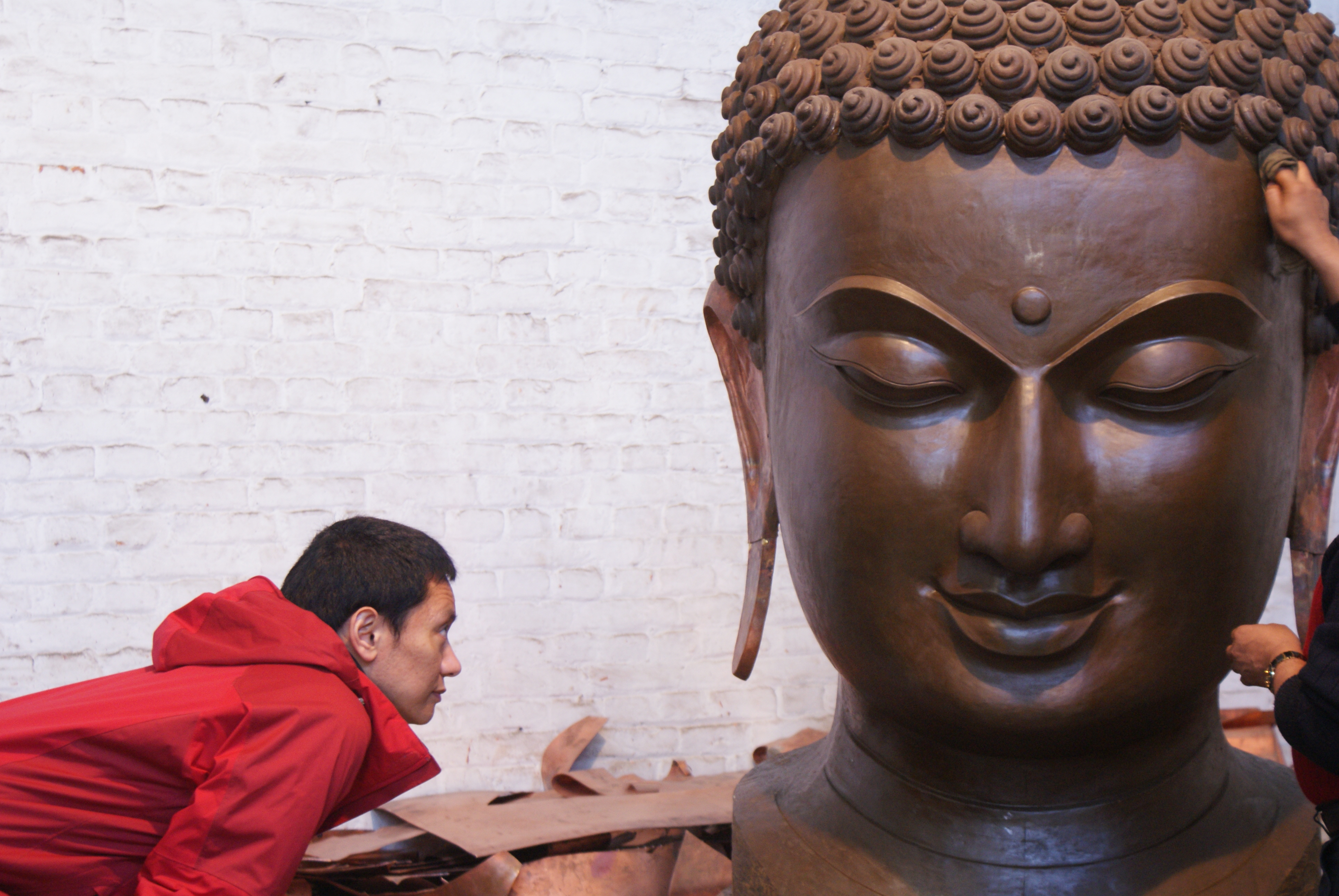
Trungram Gyalwa inspecting the Buddha statue for the World Center for Peace and Unity, Lumbini

Another of Trungram Gyalwa's projects, the World Center for Peace and Unity located at Buddha Shakyamuni's birthplace in Lumbini, Nepal, is intended as a locus for the growth of an all-encompassing non-sectarian spirit and an example of 21st century Buddhism contributing to a greener world and reviving ancient art and culture. Inaugurated in 2011, it is located in a special development zone connected to the Lumbini UNESCO World Heritage Site. Unlike the other monasteries, it was specifically conceived to be a non-sectarian center for any Buddhist or non-Buddhist visitors to Lumbini, regardless of tradition or lineage, and especially for those who were not represented by the nations who built the other monasteries. Although it is the largest building inside the Lumbini United Nations Development Project Site, it is the most environmentally friendly, with cavity walls, natural air circulation, and solar power. Trungram Gyalwa, who designed the building himself, feels this “green” approach highlights the importance of our interconnectedness, thus physically promoting peace and unity. The center's design is based on the ancient stupa at the original Nalanda University. It includes elements of early Nepalese architecture, drawn from the style of the 7th-13th centuries, known as the premier era of Buddhist architecture.

=== Educational initiatives ===
A model secondary school, Trungram International Academy (TIA), has been in operation since 1995. TIA is a private English-medium day and boarding school near Kathmandu, Nepal.

In 2003, Trungram Gyalwa initiated work on the Trungram Gyalwa Foundation, which was formally established in 2015. The goal of the organization is to foster knowledge and wisdom through multiple channels, supporting the intellectual and emotional development of people the world over. Projects include traditional schools—expanding TIA to provide schools for Nepal's earthquake victims; developing a compassion curricula; preserving ancient teachings; and conducting scientific research into the tangible benefits of values such as compassion, care and tolerance.

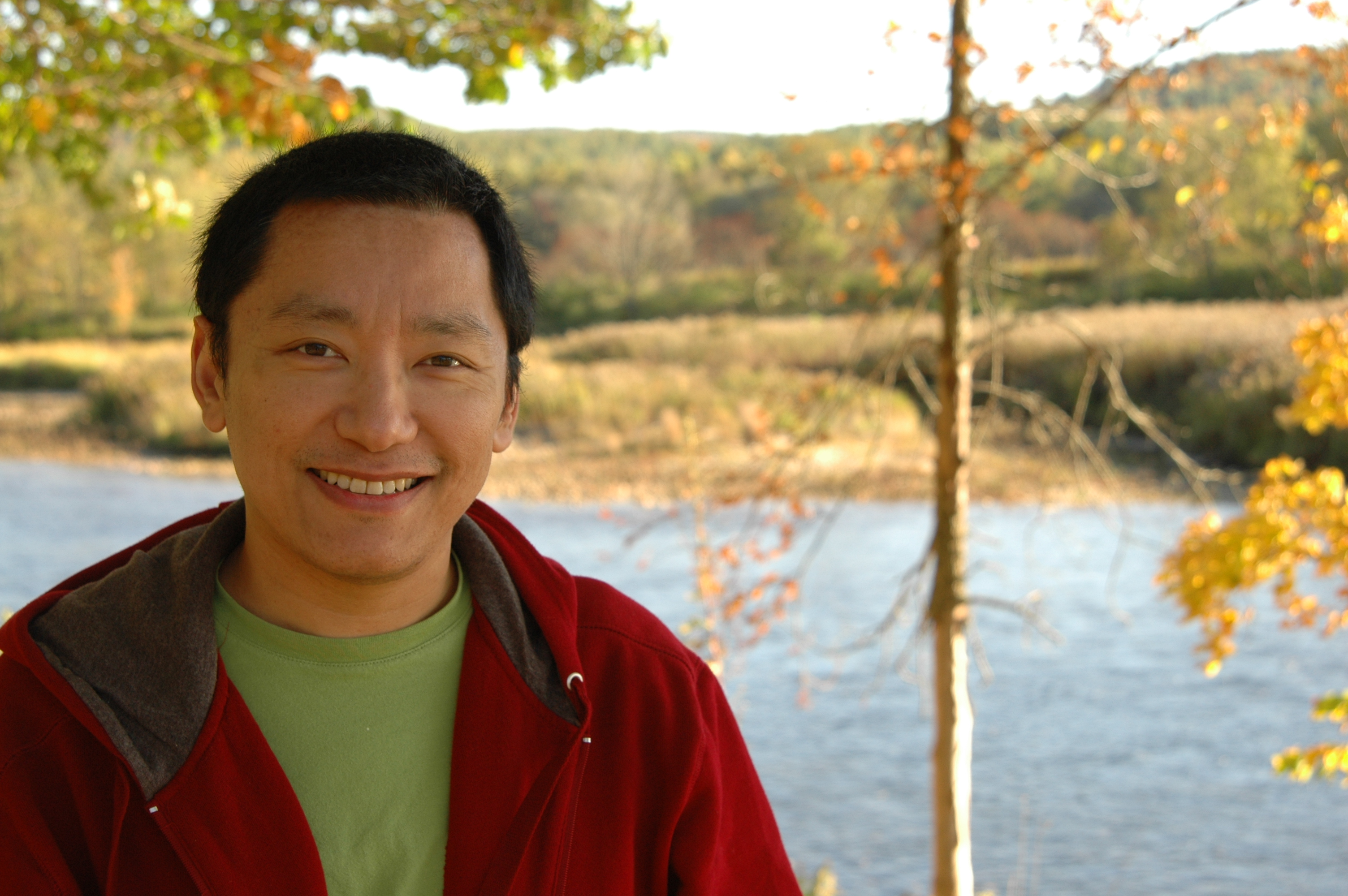

=== Writing and lecturing ===
Trungram Gyalwa is a speaker, giving teachings and participating in conferences around the United States. He spoke at Google: Mindfulness on the Mountain (Mountain View, CA, 2013).

He is also a contributor to the HuffPost and has written for Tricycle: The Buddhist Review.

== Trungram mind-stream emanation lineage ==
The Trungram Gyalwa is a lineage of tulkus of the Karma Kagyu school of Tibetan Buddhism.

The first Trungram Gyalwa was born in Lhathog, Eastern Tibet, remained a yogi his entire life, known for his meditational attainment, and was given the name "Gyalwa Tulku". Under his guidance, the Trungram Monastery located at the border of Sichuan and Tibet flourished and "Trungram" was added to his name. His younger brother and disciple Trinley Rabgye became the first Aten Rinpoche.

The second Trungram Gyalwa, Gowa Gyalwa, was both a scholar and an accomplished practitioner, displaying a Ushnisha (crown proturbance).

The 3rd Trungram Gyalwa, Gotsa Gyalwa Luntok Thrinlay (1894–1959), was born in the Wood Horse year in Derge, East Tibet and was recognized by the 15th Gyalwa Karmapa Khakyab Dorje (1871–1922). He was a heart disciple of Karmapa, respected and remembered among the Tibetans as one of the leading meditation masters of the 20th century. His knowledge of the Tripitaka and attainment in his meditation and Bodhisattva practice made him a model master.

Tens of thousands of people in the thinly populated Tibet -- laymen, monks, nuns, scholars, abbots, and well-known masters of the Kagyu, Nyingma, Sakya and Gelug schools, and the Bon tradition -- came to receive teachings from him. The broad range of students demonstrated the result of his Rimé (non-sectarian) practices which enabled him to teach students from different schools in a style most suitable to each one of them. Among these students were Dilgo Khyentse Rinpoche, family members of the 16th Karmapa, Chagmey Rinpoche, Dzigar Choktrul Rinpoche, Dzigar Thuksey Rinpoche, Zozi Jetrung Rinpoche, Surmang Rolpai Dorje and many more.

As a child, the 3rd Trungram Gyalwa was a very active boy who liked to play with dogs. At the age of 18, he suddenly became quiet and began to meditate in caves. The rest of his life was spent practicing meditation and helping others. He built many short-term and long-term retreat houses beside the Trungram Monastery. He incorporated Rechungpa's Whispered Lineage (Nyengyu) practice into the Trungram Tradition. Most of the time Trungram Gyalwa stayed in Ngonmo Namzong (Azure Sky Castle), a mountain cave not far from the monastery, doing intensive meditation practice. It is said that he loved to eat the nettles naturally growing around the cave.

Khandro Lhamo, Dilgo Khyentse Rinpoche's wife, describes their visit to Azure Sky Castle: "One of Khyenste Rinpoche's main teachers was Drungram Gyaltrul Rinpoche, who lived his entire life in a cave near Ngoma Nagsum. I had never met him before, but one time I accompanied Rinpoche to Drungram Monastery, and we stayed near his cave. His cave was in the middle of a large rock outcropping shaped like a vajra and surrounded by meadows. Five or six hundred of his disciples lived in the surrounding caves and practiced the Guru Rinpoche sadhana. So many people circumambulated the rock that the earth was worn away down to waist level. When I met him, his hair hadn't turned gray yet, so he must have been in his fifties. He would eat only once a week and almost never slept."

== Sources ==
Khyentse, Dilgo; Ani Jinpa Palmo (trans) (2008). Brilliant Moon: The Autobiography of Dilgo Khyentse. Shambhala. ISBN 978-1-59030-284-2.
