= Tulku =

Title in Tibetan Buddhism

A tulku (Tibetan: སྤྲུལ་སྐུ་, Wylie: sprul sku, ZWPY: Zhügu, also tülku, trulku) is an individual recognized as the reincarnation of a previous spiritual master (lama), and expected to be reincarnated, in turn, after death. The tulku is a distinctive and significant aspect of Tibetan Buddhism, embodying the concept of enlightened beings taking corporeal forms to continue the lineage of specific teachings. "Tulku" is a transcription of the Tibetan སྤྲུལ་སྐུ ("sprul sku"), which originally referred to an emperor or ruler taking human form on Earth, signifying a divine incarnation. Over time, it evolved within Tibetan Buddhism to denote the corporeal existence of certain highly accomplished Buddhist masters whose purpose was to ensure the preservation and transmission of a particular lineage.

The tulku system originated in Tibet, particularly associated with the recognition of the second Karmapa in the 13th century. Since then, numerous tulku lineages have been established, with each tulku having a distinctive role in preserving and propagating specific teachings. Other high-profile examples of tulkus include the Dalai Lamas, the Panchen Lamas, the Samding Dorje Phagmos, Khyentses, the Zhabdrung Rinpoches, and the Kongtruls.

The process of recognizing tulkus involves a combination of traditional and supernatural methods. When a tulku passes away, a committee of senior lamas convenes to identify the reincarnation. They may look for signs left by the departed tulku, consult oracles, rely on dreams or visions, and sometimes even observe natural phenomena like rainbows. This process combines mysticism and tradition to pinpoint the successor who will carry forward the teachings of their predecessor.

A Western tulku, one who is born in the West and commonly of non-Tibetan ethnic heritage, is the recognized successor to a lama or dharma master. This recognition has sparked debates and discussions regarding the cultural adaptation and authenticity of Westerners within the traditional Tibetan tulku system. Some argue that Westerners should explore their own forms of Buddhism rather than attempting to fit into this system. Western tulkus may struggle to gain recognition among laypeople and even other monastics. Generally, Western tulkus do not follow traditional Tibetan monastic life, and commonly leave their home monasteries for alternative careers, not necessarily chaplaincy.

== Etymology and meaning ==
The word སྤྲུལ or 'sprul' (Modern Lhasa Tibetan [ʈʉl]) was a verb in Old Tibetan literature and was used to describe the བཙན་པོ་ btsanpo ('emperor'/天子) taking a human form on earth. So the sprul idea of taking a corporeal form is a local religious idea alien to Indian Buddhism and other forms of Buddhism (e.g. Theravadin or Zen). The term tülku became associated with the translation of the Sanskrit philosophical term nirmanakaya. According to the philosophical system of trikaya or three bodies of Buddha, nirmanakaya is the Buddha's "body" in the sense of the bodymind (Sanskrit: nāmarūpa). Thus, the person of Siddhartha Gautama, the historical Buddha, is an example of nirmanakaya.

Over time, indigenous religious ideas became assimilated by the new Buddhism; e.g. sprul became part of a compound noun, སྤྲུལ་སྐུ་'sprul.sku' ("incarnation body" or 'tülku', and 'btsan', the term for the imperial ruler of the Tibetan Empire, became a kind of mountain deity). Valentine summarizes the shift in meaning of the word tülku: "This term that was originally used to describe the Buddha as a 'magical emanation' of enlightenment, is best translated as 'incarnation' or 'steadfast incarnation' when used in the context of the tulku system to describe patriarchs that reliably return to human form."

According to the Light of Fearless Indestructible Wisdom by Khenpo Tsewang Dongyal: the term tülku "designates one who is 'noble' (or 'selfless' according to Buddha's usage) and used in Buddhist texts to denote a highly achieved being who has attained the first bhumi, a level of attainment which is truly egoless, or higher." Higher Vajrayana practitioners who have attained siddhis and mastered the bardo of dying, bardo of dharmata or bardo of becoming can be reborn as a tülkus. According to Khenpo Ngawang Pelzang:

This form of transference is practiced by beginners on the path of accumulating who have received empowerment and respected the samayas, have a good understanding of the view, and have practiced the generation phase as the path but have not mastered it. Although they lack the necessary confidence to be liberated in the clear light at the moment of death or in the intermediate state of absolute reality, by taking refuge and praying to their teacher in the intermediate state they can close the way to an unfavorable womb and choose a favorable rebirth. Propelled by compassion and bodhichitta, they depart to a pure buddhafield or, failing that, take birth as a tulku born to parents who practice the Dharma. In that next life they will be liberated.

In addition to Tibet, Tibetan Buddhism is a traditional religion in China and Mongolia. The Mongolian word for a tülku is qubilγan, though such persons may also be called by the honorific title qutuγtu (Tib: 'phags-pa and Skt: ārya or superior, not to be confused with the historic figure, 'Phags-pa Lama or the script attributed to him, (Phags-pa script), or hutagt in the standard Khalkha dialect. The Chinese word for tülku is huófó (活佛), which literally means "living Buddha".

== Grades ==
Tibetans recognize at least three grades of tulku. Three of these grades as reported by Peter Bishop are:

- Low-level lamas – any monk who has been rewarded with a human rebirth
- Nearly perfected beings – these are highly skilled practitioners who intentionally reincarnate to fulfill a specific purpose or mission
- Incarnate Bodhisattvas – the fullest sense of tulku, this grade includes only the major tulku lineages such as the Karmapas, the Dalai Lamas, and the Tai Situpas.

== History ==
In a strict sense, tulku is a Tibetan translation of the Sanskrit nirmāṇakāya, which refers to the "transformation" or "emanation body" of a Buddha. Tulku is therefore the physical "form in which a Buddha appears to ordinary beings."

A related term in Tibetan is yangsi (literally "rebirth" or "re-becoming") which refers to an enlightened master who has returned to earthly existence for the sake of benefitting sentient beings. While the notion of a nirmāṇakāya is found throughout Mahayana Buddhism, and is integral to the doctrine of the trikaya ("Three Bodies"), the concept of the yangsi is uniquely Tibetan. Tulku, as a title, refers to one who is recognized as the yangsi of a master.

It arose in the context of a political vacuum spurred by the assassination of Ralpachen, which saw monastic centers develop political power in a second spreading of Buddhism in Tibet. It had "purely politico-mercantile origins and functions" and later became a significant spiritual institution. However, some commentators argue that the political shift was "grafted onto the tradition of recognizing reincarnations, not the other way around." Turrell V. Wylie wrote that the tulku system "developed in Tibetan Buddhism primarily for political reasons" while Reginald Ray argued that such a view ignores "miss[es] what is perhaps its most distinctive feature" which is its "important ideological and religious dimensions", being "deeply rooted" in the bodhisattva concept.

Tulku have been associated with ruling power since its origination, expressing indigenous Tibetan notions of kingship. This system supplanted the earlier model of monastic governance, in which a celibate religious head acted as abbot, while his brother, a married administrative head, continued the family line, with his eldest son becoming the next religious head, creating an uncle-nephew system of inheritance. The first recognized tulku was perhaps Rangjung Dorje, 3rd Karmapa Lama.

Giuseppe Tucci traced the origin of the tulku concept to Indian Vajrayana, particularly in a fragmentary biography of Maitripada he discovered in Nepal. The tulku system of preserving Dharma lineages developed in Tibet after the 12th century, with the first recognized tulku being perhaps Rangjung Dorje, 3rd Karmapa Lama. Foreign tulkus have been identified since at least the sixteenth century, when the grandson of the Mongol Altan Khan was recognized as the 4th Dalai Lama. The Mongol conversion to Buddhism served a political function and allowed Tibet to build a closer relationship with the Mongol Yuan Dynasty. Traditionally, however, tulku were only recognized from Tibetan cultural areas, encompassing Tibet, Nepal, Mongolia, and Bhutan.

The Chinese annexation of Tibet in 1959 created massive social upheaval. This intensified during the Cultural Revolution which brought irreparable damage to the institutions and traditions which constitute Tibetan Buddhism as one of the Four Olds. As a result, Tibetan Buddhism has flourished in areas of Tibetan culture not under Chinese rule, such as Nepal, Bhutan, and parts of North India. In India, the traditional monastic system is largely intact and the tulku system remains politically relevant. Compounded with the inherent transnational character of proselytizing religions, Tibetan Buddhism is "pulled between the need to adapt itself and the need to preserve itself".

Westerners began taking an interest in Tibetan Buddhism during the counterculture of the 1960s, and Tibetan Buddhism became popular among western Buddhists and they began to be recognized as incarnations of Buddhist masters around this time. Most of these, however, were expatriate Tibetans or Tibetans of mixed heritage, such as the son of Chögyam Trungpa. Initially, Westerners were not recognized as tulkus by the wider Tibetan diaspora.

The recognition of Westerners as tulkus began in the 1970s, following the spread of Tibetan Buddhism to modern Western countries such as the United States. The first recognized Western tulku was Dylan Henderson, an American boy identified as his father's teacher, or alternatively Ossian MacLise. MacLise, however, was born in Kathmandu, Nepal.

=== Lineage of the Karmapas ===
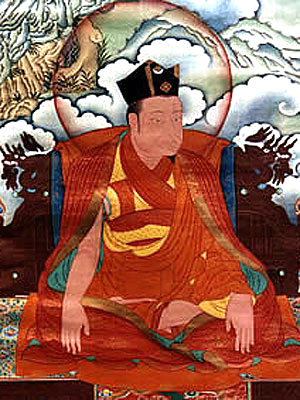
The second Karmapa was the first tulku.

Düsum Khyenpa, 1st Karmapa Lama (Wylie: Dus gsum Mkhyen pa, 1110–1193), was a disciple of the Tibetan master Gampopa. A talented child who studied Buddhism with his father from an early age and who sought out great teachers in his twenties and thirties, he is said to have attained enlightenment at the age of fifty while practicing dream yoga. He was henceforth regarded by the contemporary highly respected masters Shakya Śri and Lama Shang as the Karmapa, a manifestation of Avalokiteśvara, whose coming was predicted in the Samadhiraja Sutra and the Laṅkāvatāra Sūtra.

The Karmapa is a long line of consciously reborn lamas. A Karmapa's identity is confirmed through a combination realized lineage teachers supernatural insight, prediction letters left by the previous Karmapa, and the young child's own self-proclamation and ability to identify objects and people known to its previous incarnation.

After the first Karmapa died in 1193, a lama had recurrent visions of a particular child as his rebirth. This child (born c. 1205) was recognized as the Karma Pakshi, 2nd Karmapa Lama (1204–1283), thus beginning the Tibetan tulku tradition. Karma Pakshi was the first recognized tulku in Tibetan Buddhism that predicted the circumstances of his rebirth.

The 8th, 10th, and 12th incarnations, as well as the 16th Karmapa, each faced conflicts during their recognition, which were ultimately resolved. There was a controversy over the enthronement of two 17th Karmapas.

=== Lineage of the Dalai Lamas ===
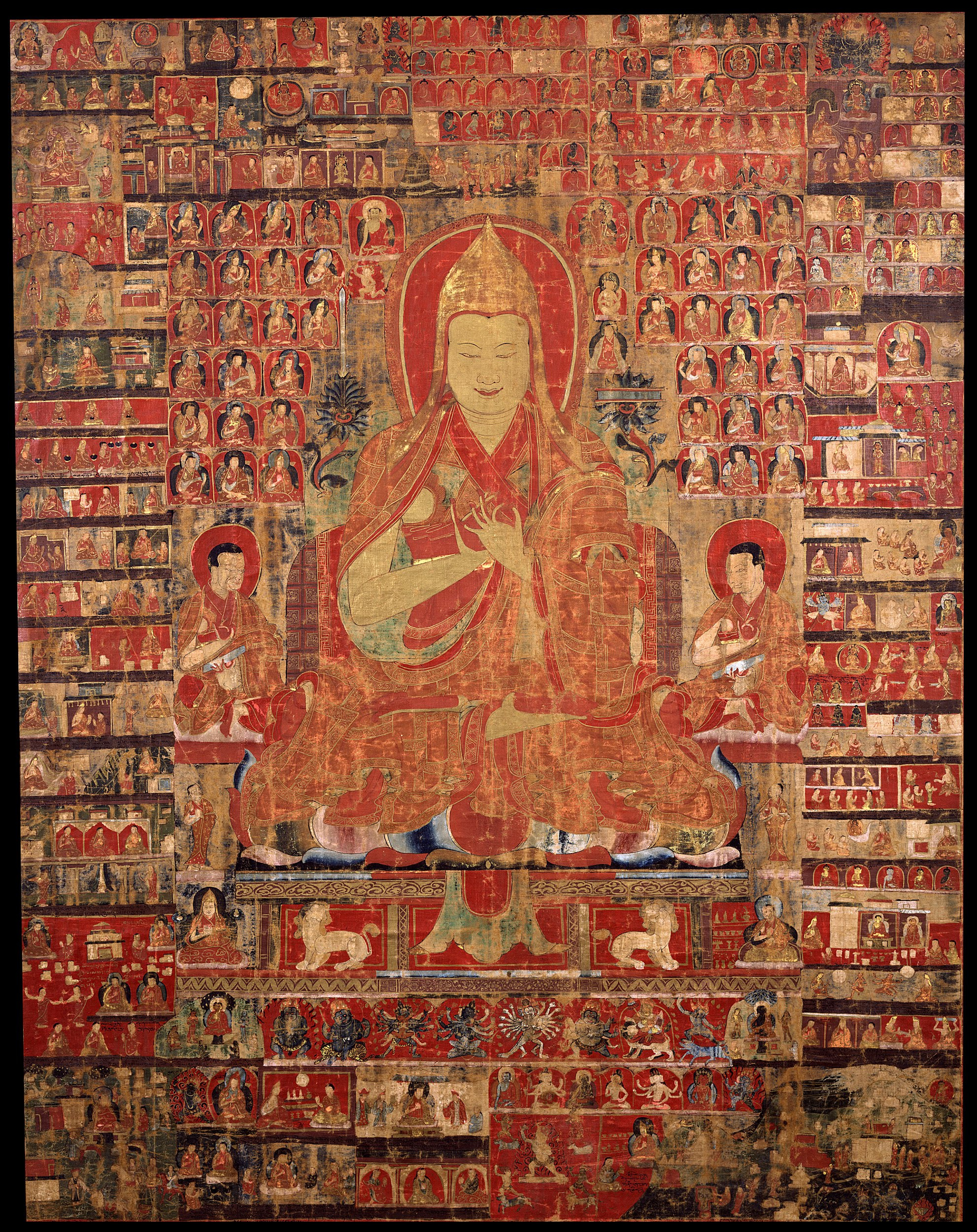
Tsongkapa, 15th-century painting, Rubin Museum of Art

Gendun Drup (1391–1474), a disciple of the founder Je Tsongkapa, was the ordination name of the monk who came to be known as the 'First Dalai Lama', but only from 104 years after he died. There had been resistance, since first he was ordained a monk in the Kadampa tradition and for various reasons, for hundreds of years the Kadampa school had eschewed the adoption of the tulku system to which the older schools adhered. Tsongkhapa largely modelled his new, reformed Gelugpa school on the Kadampa tradition and refrained from starting a tulku system. Therefore, although Gendun Drup grew to be a very important Gelugpa lama, after he died in 1474 there was no question of any search being made to identify his incarnation.

Despite this, when the Tashilhunpo monks started hearing what seemed credible accounts that an incarnation of Gendun Drup had appeared nearby and repeatedly announced himself from the age of two, their curiosity was aroused. It was some 55 years after Tsongkhapa's death when eventually, the monastic authorities saw compelling evidence that convinced them the child in question was indeed the incarnation of their founder. They felt obliged to break with their own tradition and in 1487, the boy was renamed Gendun Gyatso and installed at Tashilhunpo as Gendun Drup's tulku, albeit informally.

Gendun Gyatso died in 1542 and the lineage of Dalai Lama tulkus finally became firmly established when the third incarnation, Sonam Gyatso (1543–1588), came forth. He made himself known as the tulku of Gendun Gyatso and was formally recognised and enthroned at Drepung in 1546. When Gendun Gyatso was given the titular name "Dalai Lama" by the Tümed Altan Khan in 1578, his two predecessors were accorded the title posthumously and he became known as the third in the lineage.

=== Lineage of the Tai Situpas ===
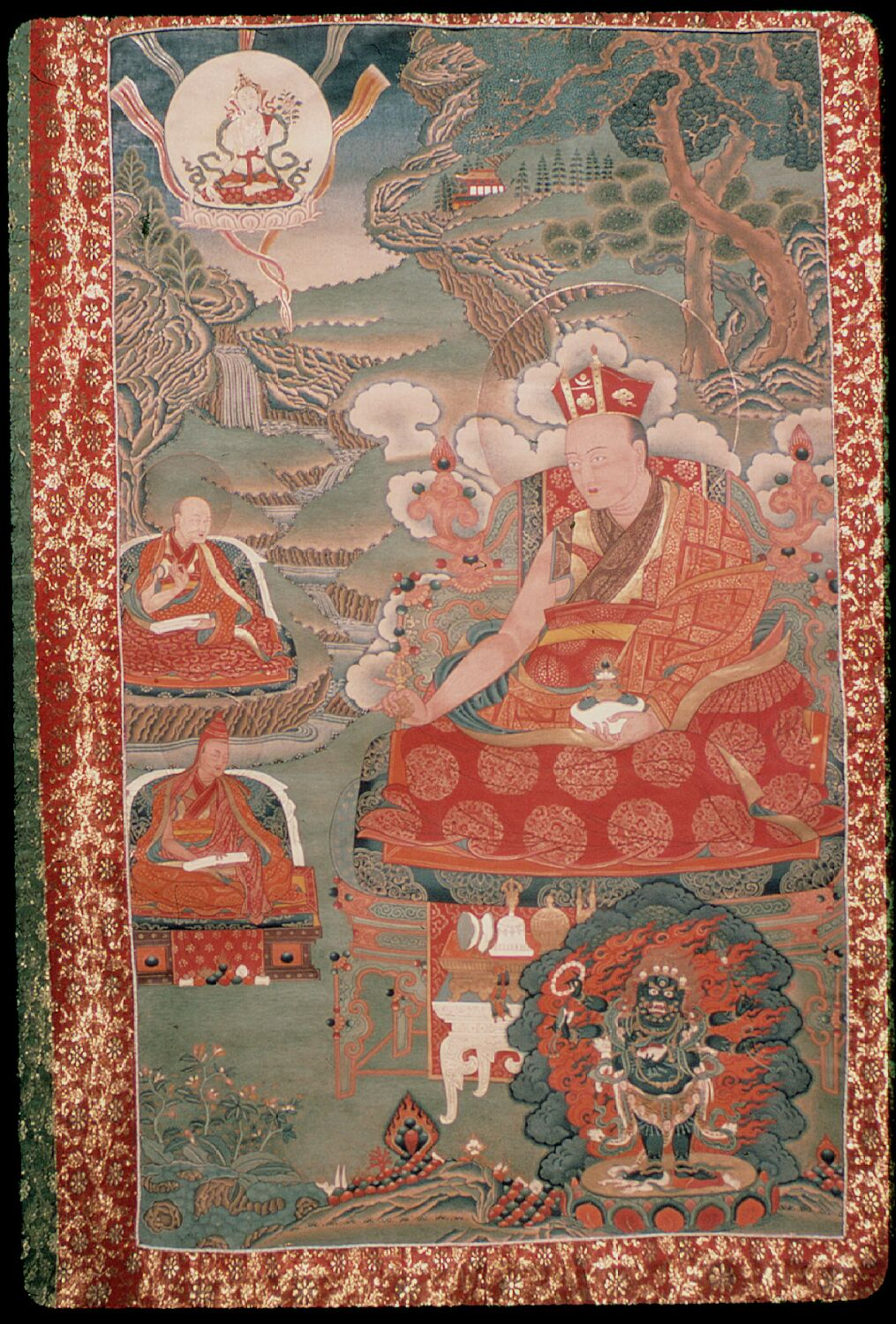
Thangka of Tai Situ

The Tai Situpa lineage is one of the oldest tulku lineages in the Kagyu school of Tibetan Buddhism In Tibetan Buddhism tradition, Kenting Tai Situpa is considered as emanation of Bodhisattva Maitreya and Padmasambhava and who has been incarnated numerous times as Indian and Tibetan yogis since the time of the historical Buddha.

Chokyi Gyaltsen was the first to bear the title "Grand Situ" (Chinese: 大司徒; pinyin: Dà Sītú), conferred upon him in 1407 by the Yongle Emperor of Ming China. He was a close disciple of Deshin Shekpa, 5th Karmapa Lama, who appointed him abbot of Karma Goen, the Karmapa's principal monastery at the time. The full title bestowed was Kenting Naya Tang Nyontse Geshetse Tai Situpa which is shortened to Kenting Tai Situ. The full title means "far reaching, unshakable, great master, holder of the command".

The current Tai Situpa, Pema Tönyö Nyinje, is the 12th. He is the head of Palpung Monastery.

=== Lineage of Samding Dorje Phagmo ===
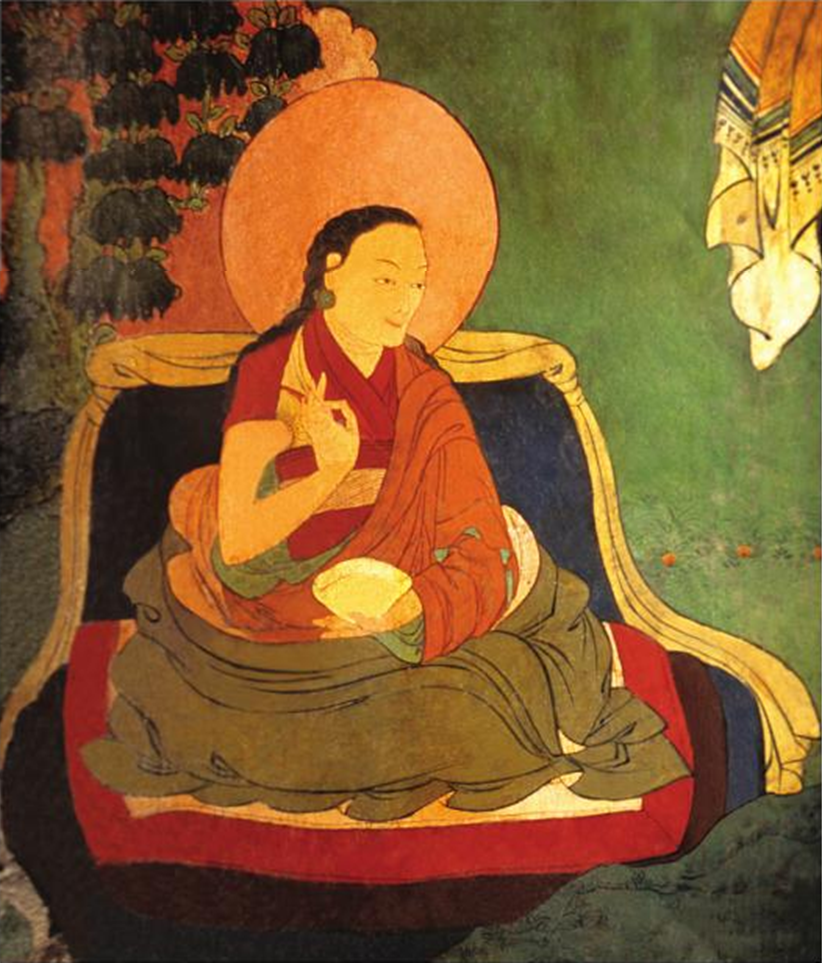
Mural depiction of Chökyi Drönma, the first incarnation of Samding Dorje Phagmo, at Nyêmo Chekar monastery

The Samding Dorje Phagmo (Tibetan: བསམ་སྡིང་རྡོ་རྗེ་ཕག་མོ) is the highest female tulku in Tibet and the third highest-ranking person in the hierarchy after the Dalai Lama and the Panchen Lama. She was listed among the highest-ranking reincarnations at the time of the 5th Dalai Lama, recognized by the Tibetan government and acknowledged by the emperors of Qing China. In her first incarnation, as Chökyi Drönma (1422–1455 CE), she was the student and consort of the famous polymath Thang Tong Gyalpo, who first identified her as an emanation of Vajravārāhī, and the consort of Bodong Panchen. The seat of the Samding Dorje Phagmo is at Samding Monastery, in Tibet.

The current (12th) Samding Dorje Pakmo Trülku is Dechen Chökyi Drönma, who was born in 1938 or 1942. Dechen Chökyi Drönma was very young at the time of the Chinese occupation, and her exact date of birth is contested. Dechen Chökyi Drönma was recognised by the present 14th Dalai Lama as a true incarnation and served as a vice president of the Buddhist Association of China in 1956 while he was president, and Choekyi Gyaltsen, 10th Panchen Lama also as vice president. She went to Lhasa in 1958 and received the empowerment of Yamantaka from the Dalai Lama and the empowerment of Vajrayogini from the Dalai Lama's tutor, Trijang Lobsang Yeshe Tenzin Gyatso. She has been trained in the Bodongpa tradition and remains the head of the Samding Monastery. She simultaneously holds the post of a high government cadre in the Tibet Autonomous Region. She has as a result been accused of collaborating with the Chinese.

=== Lineage of the Trungpa tülkus ===
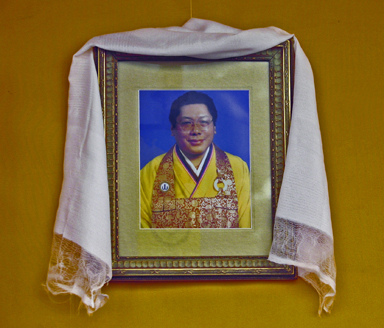
Chogyam Trungpa Rinpoche, the 11th Trungpa tülku

The Trungpa tülkus are a line of incarnate Tibetan lamas who traditionally head Surmang monastery complex in Kham, now Surmang. There have been twelve such Trungpa tulkus. They are members of the Karma Kagyu tradition as well as the Nyingma tradition. These tulkus are recognized as reincarnations of Künga Gyaltsen (15th century), a student of Trungmase.

The 11th Trungpa tulku was Chögyam Trungpa (1940–1987). He was one of the most influential teachers of Buddhism in the West and founded Shambhala Buddhism.

Choseng Trungpa Rinpoche is the 12th and current Trungpa tulku.

=== Lineage of the Zhabdrung Rinpoches ===
In Bhutan, the title Zhabdrung Rinpoche refers to Ngawang Namgyal (1594–1651), the founder of the Bhutanese state, or one of his successive reincarnations. Following his death, the ruling authorities in Bhutan were faced with the problem of succession. To neutralize the power of future Zhabdrung incarnations, the Druk Desi, Je Khenpo and penlops conspired to recognize not a single person but rather as three separate persons—a body incarnation (Ku tulku), a mind incarnation (Thu tulku or Thugtrul), and a speech incarnation (Sung tulku or Sungtrul). In spite of their efforts to consolidate the power established by the original Zhabdrung, the country sank into warring factionalism for the next 200 years. The body incarnation lineage died out in the mid-18th century, while the mind and speech incarnations of the Zhabdrung continued into the 20th century. The mind incarnation was the one generally recognized as the Zhabdrung.

Besides the mind incarnation, there was also a line of claimants for the speech incarnation. At the time the monarchy was founded in 1907, Choley Yeshe Ngodub (or Chogley Yeshey Ngodrup) was the speech incarnation and also served as the last Druk Desi. After his death in 1917, he was succeeded by Chogley Jigme Tenzin (1919–1949). The next claimant, unrecognized by the Bhutan government, lived at Tawang monastery in India and was evacuated to the western Himalayas during the 1962 Sino-Indian War.

Another line of claimants to be the mind incarnation of Ngawang Namgyal existed in Tibet, and was represented by Namkhai Norbu, who lived in Italy.

=== Lineage of the Panchen Lamas ===
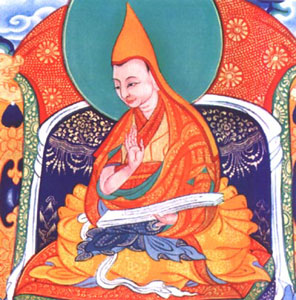
Khedrup Gelek Pelzang, 1st Panchen Lama

The recognition of Panchen Lamas began with Lobsang Chökyi Gyaltsen, tutor of the 5th Dalai Lama, who received the title "Panchen Bogd" from Altan Khan and the Dalai Lama in 1645. Bogd is Mongolian, meaning "holy". Khedrup Gelek Pelzang, Sönam Choklang and Ensapa Lobsang Döndrup were subsequently recognized as the first to third Panchen Lamas posthumously.

In 1713, the Kangxi Emperor of the Qing dynasty granted the title Panchen Erdeni to the 5th Panchen Lama. In 1792, the Qianlong Emperor issued a decree known as the 29-Article Ordinance for the More Effective Governing of Tibet, and Article One of the decree was designed to be used in the selection of rinpoches, lamas and other high offices within Tibetan Buddhism, including the Dalai Lamas, Panchen Lamas and Mongolian lamas.

Traditionally, the Panchen Lama is the head of Tashilhunpo Monastery, and holds religious and secular power over the Tsang region centered in Shigatse, independent of the Ganden Podrang authority led by the Dalai Lama. The Dalai Lama and Panchen Lama are closely connected, and each participates in the process of recognizing the other's reincarnations.

The current 11th Panchen Lama, Gedhun Choekyi Nyima, was recognized by the 14th Dalai Lama on 14 May 1995. Three days later, the six-year-old Panchen Lama was kidnapped by the Chinese government and his family was taken into custody. The Chinese government instead named Gyaincain Norbu as the 11th Panchen Lama. Their nomination has been widely rejected by Buddhists in Tibet and abroad, while governments have called for information about and the release of the Panchen Lama. Gedhun Choekyi Nyima has never been publicly seen since 1995.

=== Lineage of Genyenma Ahkon Lhamo ===
The first Genyenma Ahkon Lhamo, a meditator recognized as a wisdom dakini was one of the main disciples of Namchö Mingyur Dorje (1645–1667) and sister of Rigdzin Kunzang Sherab, Migyur Dorje's Dharma heir and the First Throneholder of Palyul Monastery (founded 1665). She was credited as being instrumental to the founding of Palyul (now one of the Nyingma's six main or "mother" monasteries) and for leaving a relic that is important to Palyul. During the cremation of her body, her kapala (top half of the skull) is said to have flown three kilometers and come to rest at the foot of the teaching throne of her brother. Found to be miraculously embossed with the sacred syllable AH, the kapala became an important relic housed at Palyul monastery in Tibet.

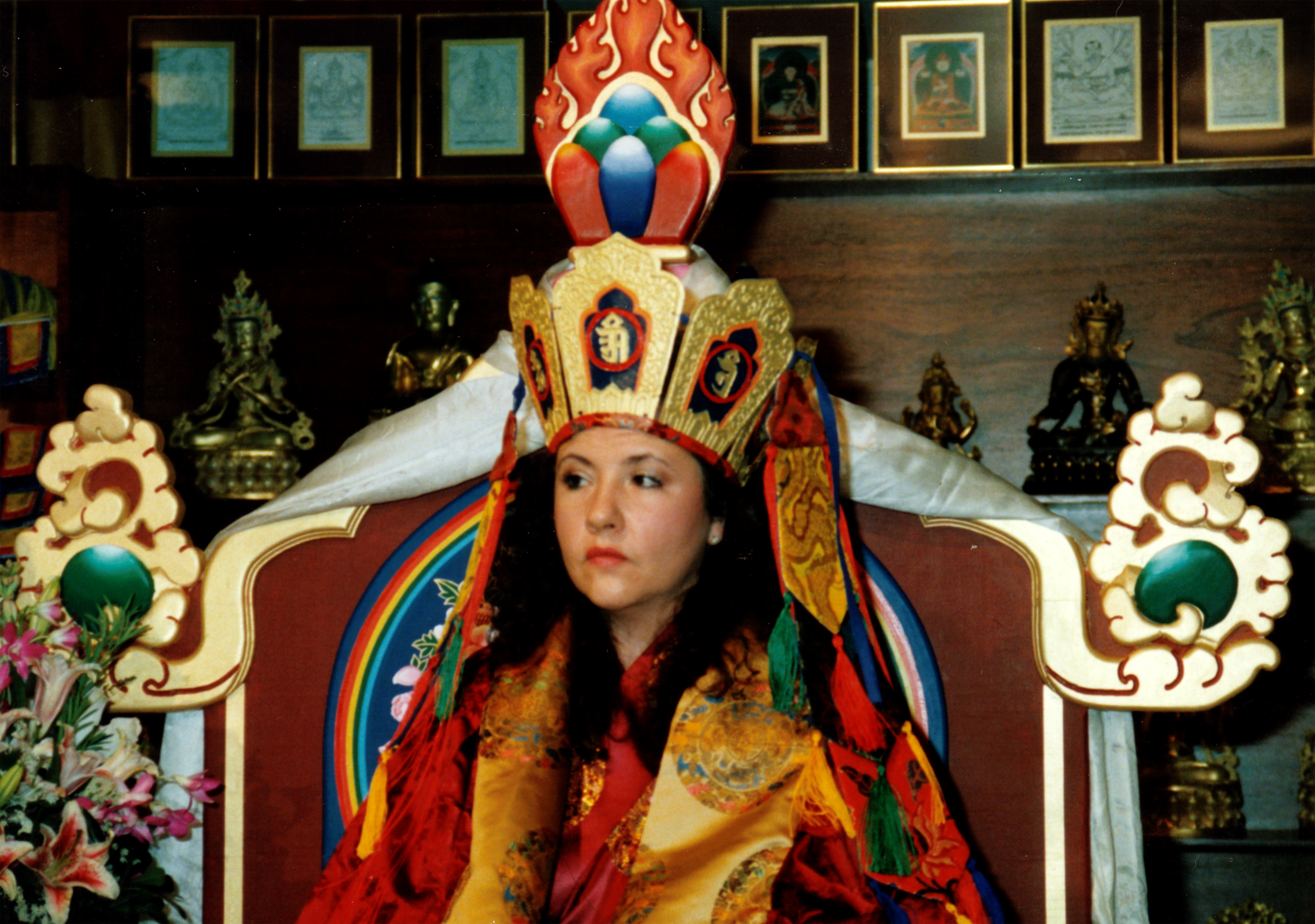
Western tulku Jetsunma Ahkon Lhamo during her enthronement

The Third Drubwang Padma Norbu ("Penor") Rinpoche, 11th Throneholder of Palyul Monastery, former Supreme Head of the Nyingma tradition was recognized as a tulku and brought to Palyul Monastery in 1936 at the age of four. He recounted that as a young tulku in Tibet, inspired by seeing the skull relic, he made prayers to find Ahkon Lhamo's incarnation. Though most of the kapala relic was pulverized into dust during the Cultural Revolution, one Tibetan man managed to save a silver dollar-size piece on which the syllable "AH" appears. Penor Rinpoche acquired it from him on a return trip to Tibet in 1987. He had it preserved in a crystal lotus bowl.

In 1987, Penor Rinpoche officially recognized Alyce Louise Zeoli as the tulku of Genyenma Ahkon Lhamo during her visit to his Namdroling Monastery in Bylakuppe, Karnataka, India. He gave her the crystal lotus bowl containing the relic of Ahkon Lhamo just prior to the occasion of her enthronement ceremony as Jetsunma Ahkon Lhamo at Kunzang Palyul Choling (KPC) in 1988. The relic remains at KPC and is displayed on auspicious days.

=== Lineage of Jamgon Kongtrul ===
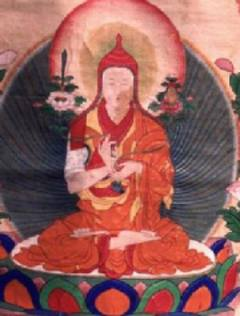
Jamgön Kongtrül Lodrö Thayé

Kongtrul tulkus are the main custodians of Jamgon Kongtrul (1813–1899). Jamgön Kongtrül Lodrö Thayé was a Tibetan Buddhist scholar, poet, artist, physician, tertön and polymath. He is credited as one of the founders of the Rimé movement (non-sectarian), compiling what is known as the "Five Great Treasuries". He achieved great renown as a scholar and writer, especially among the Nyingma and Kagyu lineages and composed over 90 volumes of Buddhist writing, including his magnum opus, The Treasury of Knowledge. There have been several recognized tulkus of Lodro Thaye.

The current lineage holder as the 4th Jamgon Kongtrul is Lodrö Chökyi Nyima. He was recognized in August 1996 by Ogyen Trinley Dorje, the 17th Karmapa, who gave the name Jamgon Lodro Chokyi Nyima Dronme Chok Thamced Le Nampar Gyalwe De. He was born on November 26, 1995, in Chushur Dzong, near Chushur Dzong, in Central Tibet. This recognition was confirmed by the 14th Dalai Lama, Sakya Trizin, head of the Sakya school of Tibetan Buddhism, and Mindroling Trichen, former head of the Nyingma tradition. All three performed hair-cutting ceremonies and bestowed names, as is traditional. As the reincarnation of Jamgon Kongtrul, Lodrö is entitled to be called "Rinpoche".

=== Lineage of Jamyang Khyentse Wangpo ===
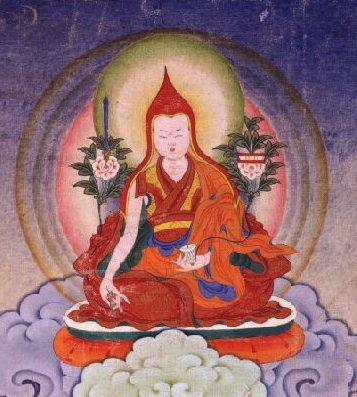
Painting of Jamyang Khyentse Wangpo

Khyentse tulkus are the main custodians of the lineage of Jamyang Khyentse Wangpo (1820–1892), a teacher, scholar and tertön of 19th-century Tibet. He was a leading figure in the Rimé movement.

Several tulkus of Jamyang Khyentse Wangpo, including those of body (sku), speech (gsung), mind (thugs), qualities (yon tan) and activity (Wylie: 'phrin las), were recognized in Tibet. Of these, the body incarnation was Dzongsar Khyentse Jamyang Chökyi Wangpo, who was enthroned at Jamyang Khyentse Wangpo's main seat at Dzongsar Monastery but died in an accident c. 1909. The activity incarnation Dzongsar Khyentse Chökyi Lodrö, who was originally enthroned at Katok Monastery succeeded him. The speech incarnation was the Second Beru Khyentse and the mind incarnation Dilgo Khyentse. Since the early 1960s, Dilgo Khyentse, single-handedly upholding the unique tradition of Khyentse incarnations, propagated Buddhism tirelessly in India, Bhutan, Nepal, Tibet, and the West.

=== Lineage of Dudjom Lingpa ===
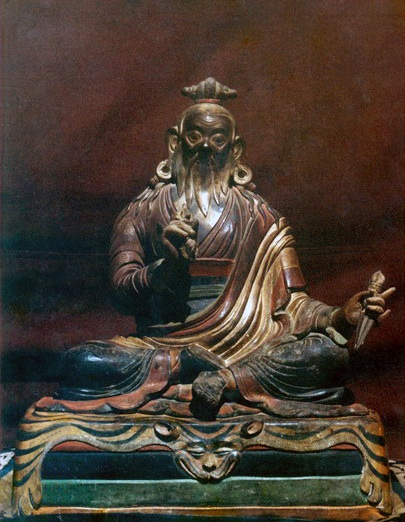
Dudjom Lingpa

Dudjom Lingpa (1835–1904) was a Tibetan meditation master, spiritual teacher and tertön. He stands out from the norm of Tibetan Buddhist teachers in the sense that he had no formal education, nor did he take ordination as a monk or belong to any established Buddhist school or tradition of his time.

His recognized successor, Kyabje Dudjom Jigdral Yeshe Dorje, was more commonly known as Dudjom Rinpoche (1904–1987). He is considered to be the direct incarnation of Dudjom Lingpa. He was a Nyingma householder, yogi, and a Vajrayana and Dzogchen master. According to his disciple Khenpo Tsewang Dongyal, he was revered as "His Holiness" and as a "Master of Masters".

The third Dudjom tulku, Sangye Pema Zhepa, was first recognized by terton Khandro Tare Lama through a prophetic poem written in dakini script on the day of his birth. Tare Lama wrote to Chatral Rinpoche, who confirmed the prophecy and recognized the three-year-old tulku in person. Recognitions were also conferred by the 14th Dalai Lama, Kyabje Penor Rinpoche, Sakya Trinzin Rinpoche, and others. On February 15, 2022, Dudjom Rinpoche Sangye Pema Zhepa, after telling his staff that he was going to rest and relax, suddenly died. He was 32 years of age when he passed at the Dudjom Labrang, his residence.

=== Lineage of Thubten Yeshe ===
Thubten Yeshe (1935–1984) was a Tibetan lama who, while exiled in Nepal, co-founded Kopan Monastery (1969) and the Foundation for the Preservation of the Mahayana Tradition (1975). He followed the Gelug tradition, and was considered unconventional in his teaching style. Lama Yeshe died in 1984, 20 minutes before dawn on the first day of Losar, the Tibetan New Year. His body was cremated at the Vajrapani Institute in Boulder Creek, California, where there is a stupa honoring him.

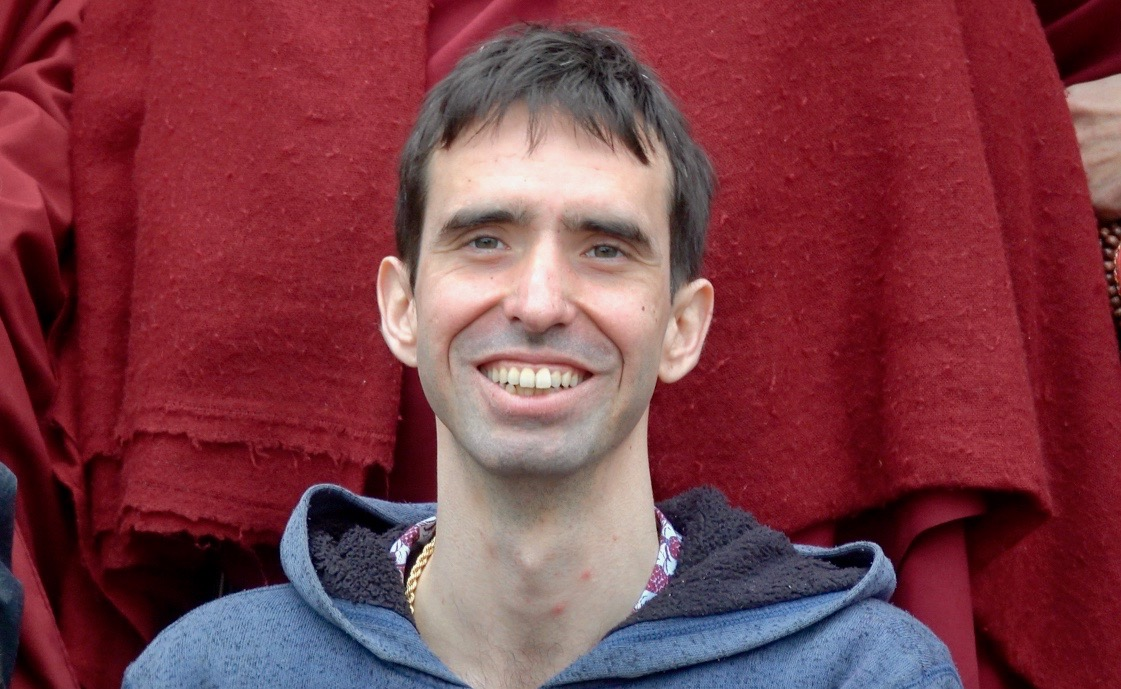
Tenzin Ösel Hita in 2018

In 1986, after certain traditional tests, the Dalai Lama formally recognized Tenzin Ösel Hita as the tulku or reincarnation of Thubten Yeshe—making him one of only a handful of Western tulkus—and renamed him "Tenzin Ösel Rinpoche" (Tibetan: བསྟན་འཛིན་འོད་གསལ་རིན་པོ་ཆེ།). This makes Thubten Yeshe the first in a new lineage of tulkus. As a child Ösel was heavily promoted by the FPMT, and made the subject of a book by Vicki Mackenzie, Reincarnation: The Boy Lama. He is the fifth of nine siblings.

== Process ==
=== Finding a successor ===
Pamela Logan outlines a general approach for finding a successor:

When an old tulku dies, a committee of senior lamas convenes to find the young reincarnation. The group may employ a number of methods in their search. First, they will probably look for a letter left behind by the departed tulku indicating where he intends to be born again. They will ask the close friends of the departed to recall everything he said during his last days, in case he may have given hints. Often, an oracle is consulted. Sometimes a prominent lama has a dream that reveals details of the child's house, parents, or of geographical features near his home. Sometimes heaven presents a sign, perhaps a rainbow, leading the search party to the child.

=== Training ===
Logan describes the training a tulku undergoes from a young age:

He is brought up inside a monastery, under the direction of a head tutor and a number of other teachers or servants. He must study hard and adhere to a strict regimen. He has few if any toys or playmates, and is rarely allowed outside. Early on, he learns to receive important visitors, take part in complicated rituals, and give blessings to followers and pilgrims. Sometimes one or both parents are allowed to live near the young tulku. Older brothers are sometimes inducted into the monastery as monk-companions for the holy child. Yet his elderly tutors are the most influential people in his life, and they become his de facto parents.

The academic atmosphere is balanced by unconditional love:

Countering the bleak academic regimen is an atmosphere of overwhelming, unconditional love. During the tulku's every waking moment, monks, family members, and awed, adoring visitors, shower the youth with love. If you visit a child tulku, you will probably notice that his quarters are pervaded by a wonderful glow. Everyone beams at the tulku. The tulku beams back. If he asks for something, he is given it immediately, and if he errs, he is corrected just as immediately. Western visitors to the young 14th Dalai Lama commented on "the extraordinary steadiness of his gaze." Even when quite young, the boys have remarkable poise; they sit calmly without fidgeting, even through ceremonies that may last all day.

== Analysis and criticism ==
According to Dzongsar Jamyang Khyentse Rinpoche, the tulku system is a method of identifying and nurturing spiritual talent, ensuring the continuity of the tradition, and controlling resources and revenue streams. He describes how the system also ensured control of valuable real estate and financial capital, making Tibetan monasteries early examples of capitalistic institutions. In an analysis of an article titled "Time for Radical Change in How We Raise Our Tulkus" by Dzongsar Jamyang Khyentse Rinpoche, Ken McLeod relates that the tulku system is facing challenges in the modern world. Tulkus can no longer be secluded during training as they were in Tibet, and their roles are changing. There is a shift from the traditional three-year retreat, and the adoption of titles like "His Holiness" has become a competition among tulku lineages to establish pedigree.

The tulku system has been criticized since its inception. In the centuries following the inception of the system used to identify reincarnate lamas, the process became increasingly corrupted and politicized by those living outside monastic-ordination systems, as the process also led indirectly to sources of material wealth and power in Tibet. (Note: McKay 2003, p. 237: "Ordinarily the rebirth is found by the oracular prediction of some local lama of repute when in a state of trance. Corruption is general and a large proportion of reincarnations are members of noble or wealthy families. [...] The multiplication of reincarnations seems to be a development due to motives very similar to those which in the middle ages filled our abbeys and cathedrals with the bodies and relics of saints. A reincarnation is a valuable asset to any lamasery on account of the offerings which his holiness attracts, and it is a great temptation to a poor lamasery to magnify the merits of one of its learned monks in order to justify a search for his reimbodiment. The longer the series of reincarnations the more holy the saint becomes.") (Note: Curren 2006, pp. 4–5: "Outsiders might think that tulkus were always chosen according to set procedures laid down to ensure the accuracy of the result-that the child located would be the genuine reincarnation of the dead master, as in the scene from the movie Kundun. But in Tibetan history, tulku searches were not always conducted in such a pure way. Because reincarnating lamas inherited great wealth and power from their predecessors they became the center of many political disputes. "Tulkus were often recognized based on non-religious factors. Sometimes monastic officials wanted a child from a powerful local noble family to give their cloister more political clout. Other times, they wanted a child from a lower-class family that would have little leverage to influence the child's upbringing. In yet other situations, the desires of the monastic officials took second place to external politics. A local warlord, the Chinese emperor, or even the Dalai Lama's government in Lhasa might try to impose its choice of tulku on a monastery for political reasons.") (Note: Samuel 1993, p. 285: "Disputes over the recognition of trulku are not uncommon, and Tibetans are well aware of the possibility of fraud. In the premodern period, wealthy estates were frequently at issue in such cases and for a family to have its child recognized as a major trulku made a dramatic difference to the family's status and resources.") (Note: Thondup 2011, p.: "The main cause of corruption, however, is not the lack of merit of the tulku tradition in general or the lack of enlightened lamas who are able to recognize them. Rather, it is the greed for material or social gain that drives the parents, relatives, or other interested people to fabricate stories and manipulate the process in favor of their own candidate. In the past, institutions such as monasteries and nunneries mostly maintained strict and vigilant safeguards against such improper influences. But today, in many cases, the institutions themselves are powerless at best.") Highly respected teachers like the 14th Dalai Lama and Shamar Rinpoche have bemoaned the practice as belonging to feudal times, and have advocated revamping the system in way that divorces the reincarnate teacher from administrative politics and allows them to distinguish themselves. (Note: Puri 2019: "'Institutions need to be owned by the people, not by an individual. Like my own institution, the Dalai Lama's office, I feel it is linked to a feudal system. In 1969, in one my official statements, I had mentioned it should continue... But now I feel, not necessarily. It should go. I feel it should not be concentrated in a few people only (Tibetans)', he said.") (Note: Curren 2006, p. 254: "Surprisingly, considering that Tibetans believe him to be a high tulku himself, Shamar is one of the loudest critics of filling leadership positions in Tibetan Buddhism with reincarnate lamas. 'I have criticized Tibetan monastery administration since I was a boy at Rumtek', Shamar told me. 'Choosing tulkus has always been political. Now, this is becoming painfully clear to all. Tulkus are just bodhisattvas. They can reincarnate as humans, but also as fish or birds, for example. They do not need to be recognized officially to do their work to help sentient beings. I pray that bodhisattvas will continue to help our world. But we do not need to make them our administrative leaders. This just leads to too many fake tulkus and cheapens both religion and politics. We should slowly work to abandon this system and begin choosing leading lamas on the basis of their merit.' "Shamar believes that lamas who serve as leaders of Buddhist schools or powerful monasteries should be elected by their peers, as in the case of the head lama of Bhutan, known as the Je Khenpo, or the Ganden Tripa of the Gelugpas. Both of these positions are filled by older, experienced lamas who serve a term as leader after being selected by a qualified group of other high lamas. 'They are not treated like gods, but merely respected as experienced elders', Shamar said.") (Note: Frayer 2019: "According to Tibetan Buddhist belief, he has control over his reincarnation: 'The person who reincarnates has sole legitimate authority over where and how he or she takes rebirth', according to the Dalai Lama's official website, 'and how that reincarnation is to be recognized'.") (Note: Terhune 2004, p. 141: "The record of the Dalai Lamas reveals one ambitious power struggle after another, frequently orchestrated by ministers or regents keen to hang onto their authority. Influential monks were often similarly well connected. Certain aristocratic or otherwise important families generated a suspicious abundance of consequential lamas. Tulkus meant power in a theocracy. While most incarnate lamas are revered as sincere, spiritual figures, these holy individuals can also be exploited by ambitious persons in their entourage. Even strong lamas are not immune to manipulation by people in their families or monasteries. Lamas who cite flaws in the tulku system—including the current Dalai Lama—point out that if a halfway intelligent child is plucked from poverty and oblivion and given every advantage and education, he is likely to make something of himself. And if a child is truly extraordinary, he will naturally distinguish himself.")

Criticism has also been directed against individual tulkus, including both Tibetan and Western tulkus. The validity of the recognition of Tsangyang Gyatso (born 1683) as the 6th Dalai Lama in 1697 was questioned due to the fact that he preferred a libertine lifestyle to that of an ordained monk. Living as a ngagpa (lay practitioner and yogi), he grew his hair long, dressed as a regular Tibetan, and was said to drink alcohol and enjoy the company of women.

Chögyam Trungpa, the 11th Trungpa tulku, was criticized for his unconventional teaching style, for his sexual involvement with a number of his female students, and for smoking tobacco and liberally using alcohol; many who knew him characterized him as an alcoholic. The case of Trungpa has been used as an example in calls to reform the tulku system.

The enthronement of Steven Seagal in 1997 prompted debate. Penor Rinpoche, who has recognized several Western tulku, defended his recognition of Seagal, arguing that it was not uncommon to recognize tulku late in life or for there to exist large gaps between incarnations of a tulku. Seagal is involved in the international arms trade and the government of Russia, which has prompted criticism of his title by English journalist Marina Hyde.

Tibetan tulku Sogyal Rinpoche, recognized as an incarnation of 19th-century Tibetan master and visionary Tertön Sogyal Lerab Lingpa, was accused of sexual and physical assault and abuse, as well as misusing charitable funds, with allegations stretching back to the 1970s. In 2017 his organisation, Rigpa, announced these allegations would be investigated by an outside party and on 5 September 2018, Rigpa released an independent report produced by the UK law firm Lewis Silkin LLP, which upheld most of the allegations. The case of Sogyal Rinpoche has been used as an example in calls to reform the tulku system.

Penor Rinpoche has faced criticism for having officially recognized several Western tulkus, including accusations of bestowing titles for payment, which he has denied. The current Dalai Lama is uncertain whether the recognition of Western tulkus is beneficial.

== List of tulku lineages ==
This is a list of tulku lineages. Tibetologist Françoise Pommaret estimates there are presently approximately 500 tulku lineages found across Tibet, Bhutan, Northern India, Nepal, Mongolia, and the southwest provinces of China.

- Arjia Rinpoche (on the 8th incarnation)
- Bardor Rinpoche (on the 3rd incarnation)
- Chagdud Rinpoche
- Changkya Khutukhtu
- Chetsang Rinpoche
- Chokling tulkus
- Chungdrag Dorje
- Chungtsang Rinpoche
- Dalai Lama (Wylie: Tā-la’i Bla-ma) (on the 14th incarnation)
- Dodrupchen tulkus, the main custodians of Longchen Nyingthig
- Dudjom Rinpoche
- Dzigar Kongtrul Rinpoche (on the 2nd or 3rd incarnation)
- Dzogchen Rinpoche (on the 7th incarnation)
- Dzogchen Ponlop Rinpoche (on the 7th incarnation)
- Gochen Tulku
- Goshir Gyaltsab (on the 12th incarnation)
- Gyalwang Drukpa (on the 12th incarnation)
- Jamgon Kongtrul (on the 4th incarnation, disputed)
- Jamyang Khyentse Wangpo
- Jamyang Shêpa (on the 6th incarnation)
- Jebtsundamba Khutuktu (on the 9th incarnation)
- Jetsunma Ahkon Lhamo
- Ju Mipham
- Kalu Rinpoche (on the 2nd incarnation)
- Karma Chagme (current is 7th incarnation)
- Karmapa (Wylie: Karma-pa) (on the 17th incarnation, disputed)
- Khamtrul Rinpoche
- Khandro Rinpoche
- Khenpo Shenga
- Ngawang Jigdral Rinpoche
- Pagbalha Hutugtu (on the 11th incarnation, currently Pagbalha Geleg Namgyai)
- Panchen Lama (on the 11th incarnation, disputed, one appointed by the Chinese government)
- Pawo (Wylie: Gnas-nang Dpa’-bo) (on the 11th incarnation)
- Penor Rinpoche (3rd incarnation deceased in 2009)
- Reting Rinpoche (on the 6th or 7th incarnation, disputed, one appointed by Chinese government)
- Samding Dorje Phagmo (Wylie: Bsam-lding Rdo-rje Phag-mo) (on the 12th incarnation, another Dorje Phagmo line in Bhutan)
- Shamarpa (Wylie: Zhwa-dmar-pa) (14th incarnation died 2014)
- Sogyal Rinpoche
- Tai Situpa (Wylie: Tai Si-tu-pa) (on the 12th incarnation)
- Taktser Rinpoche (extinguished in 2008)
- Tarthang Tulku
- Tenzin Delek Rinpoche
- Thrangu Rinpoche (on the 9th incarnation)
- Thubten Yeshe (on the 2nd incarnation, rejected by current tulku, who is committed to spiritual discovery in a post-modern context)
- Traleg Kyabgon Rinpoche (on the 10th incarnation)
- Trungpa (Wylie: Drung-pa) (on the 12th incarnation)
- Trungram Gyaltrul Rinpoche (on the 4th incarnation)
- Tsem Tulku Rinpoche (Wylie: Tshems Sprul-sku; 3rd incarnation died 2019)
- Tulku Urgyen Rinpoche (on the 2nd incarnation?)
- Yongey Mingyur Rinpoche
- Zhabdrung Rinpoche (Wylie: Zhabs-drung) (on the 14th incarnation)

== See also ==
- Avatar – Incarnation of a god on Earth in Hinduism
- Enlightenment – Highest spiritual goal in Buddhist cultivation
- Karmapa controversy – Tibetan Buddhism tulku lineage dispute
- Kumari – Tradition of worshipping a living goddess in Nepal
- My Reincarnation
- Proselytism – Attempt to convert others to a religion
- Reincarnation Application – Chinese regulation
- Tulku
- Unmistaken Child
