= Ngawang Jigdral Rinpoche =

Personal life
- Born: Pemba Sherpa
- Education: Taktse Nyingma Institute, Gangtok Sikkim, India
- Other name: Gomchen Rinpoche
- Occupation: Lama

Religious life
- Religion: Tibetan Buddhism
- School: Vajrayana
- Lineage: [Nyingma
- Dharma name: Tulku Ngawang Jigdral Rinpoche

Senior posting
- Teacher: Khenchen Rigzin Dorjee Rinpoche
- Reincarnation: Gomchhen Rinpoche, Great Yogi Lama

Dorje Lopon Ngawang Jigdral Rinpoche, is a Nyingma tulku of Sherpa descent.
