= Choseng Trungpa =

Buddhist Lama (born 1989)

- Title: 12th Zurmang Trungpa

Personal life
- Born: February 6, 1989 (age 37) Derge, Tibet

Religious life
- Religion: Buddhism
- School: Vajrayana
- Lineage: Karma Kagyu
- Dharma name: Chokyi Sengay Trungpa Rinpoche

Senior posting
- Teacher: Karma Sengye Rinpoche
- Predecessor: Chögyam Trungpa
- Reincarnation: Chogyam Trungpa

Choseng Trungpa Rinpoche, formally the 12th Zurmang Trungpa, Chokyi Sengye, is the 12th and current Trungpa lineage holder. He was born on February 6, 1989, in Pawo village, in Derge, eastern Tibet. He was recognized by the 12th Tai Situ Rinpoche in 1991, and enthroned a year later at Surmang Monastery at a ceremony presided over by Domkhar Rinpoche, a high Kagyu Rinpoche, and Choseng Trungpa's uncle. The monastery's late Rinpoche and Choseng Trungpa's predecessor, was Chogyam Trungpa Rinpoche. The name Choseng is a contraction of Chokyi Sengye (Tibetan: ཆོས་ཀྱི་སེང་གེ་, Wylie: Chos-kyi Seng-ge), which means "Lion of Dharma."

Choseng Trungpa studied the traditions of Surmang under the tutelage of Lama Kenla (1932–2003) and received his early monastic education at the Shedra at Palpung Monastery. He studied at Surmang Namgyal-tse until 2008, and then began studies at Serthar Institute.

In 2001, he met for the first time with Sakyong Mipham Rinpoche, the first son of his previous incarnation, Chögyam Trungpa.

== See also ==
- Shambhala International
- Surmang
