= Deyangshar =

Courtyard of a Buddhist monastery

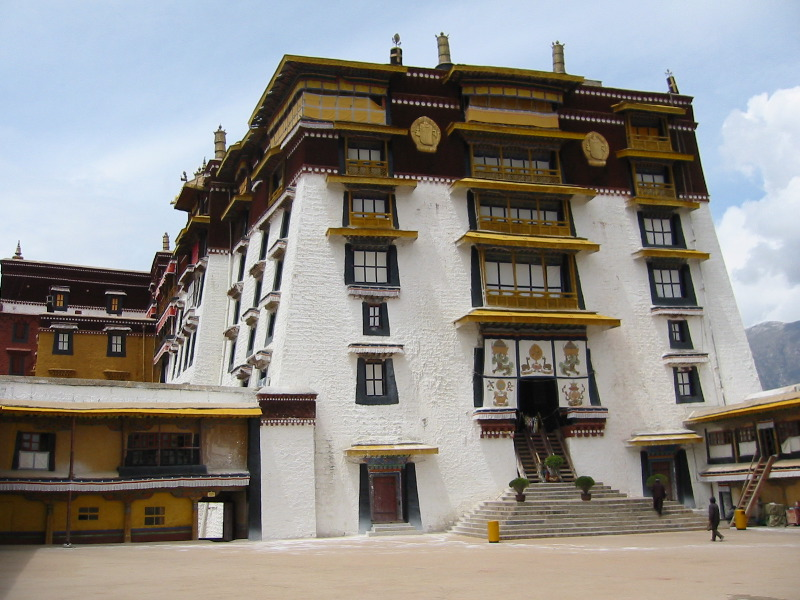
The deyangshar of the Potala. Facing the White Palace

Deyangshar is the name given to the central open courtyard of a monastery in Tibet and parts of Myanmar where it is used for prayer, ceremonies, burning incense, and to divide the living quarters from the temple. A well-known example is the Potala Palace of the Dalai Lama in Lhasa, where the great palacial monastery is divided into a white and a red palace with a yellow painted deyangshar separating to two sectors.
