= Trungpa tülkus =

- Trungpa tülku

Tibetan name
- Tibetan: དྲུང་པ་སྤྲུལ་སྐུ་
Transcriptions
- Wylie: drung pa sprul sku

The Trungpa tülkus are a line of incarnate Tibetan lamas who traditionally head Surmang monastery complex in Kham, now Surmang. There have been twelve such Trungpa tulkus. They are members of the Karma Kagyu tradition as well as the Nyingma tradition.

== Line of the Trungpa tulkus ==
1. Künga Gyaltsen (15th century), student of Trungmase
2. Künga Sangpo (born 1464)
3. Künga Öser (15th and 16th centuries)
4. Künga Namgyal (1567–1629)
5. Tenpa Namgyal (1633–1712)
6. Tendzin Chökyi Gyatso (1715–1761)
7. Jampal Chökyi Gyatso (1763–1768)
8. Gyurme Thenphel (born 1771)
9. Tenpa Rabgye (19th century)
10. Chökyi Nyinche (1879–1939)
11. Chögyam Trungpa (Chökyi Gyamtso, 1940–1987) was one of the most influential teachers of Buddhism in the West. He founded Shambhala Buddhism.
12. Choseng Trungpa (Chökyi Sengye, born February 6, 1989) is the present Trungpa tülku.

== Chökyi Nyinche ==
According to Fabrice Midal, the tenth Trungpa tulku rejected his role as fundraiser for the Surmang monasteries and preferred to live as a disciplined meditation practitioner. At one point, to escape his duties as the figurehead of the monastery complex, he ran away on foot to study with Jamgon Kongtrul. He studied with Kongtrul Rinpoche for many years before returning to Surmang, and at that point had the reputation of a realized teacher. Dilgo Khyentse and the second Jamgon Kongtrul of Sechen studied with him. They later became the direct teachers of the eleventh Trungpa tulku.
