= Surmang =

Geographical region in Tibet and Qinghai, China

Coordinates: 32.350°N 97.233°E

Tibetan name
- Tibetan: ཟུར་མང་དགོན་པ
Transcriptions
- Wylie: zur mang dgon pa
- THL: Zurmang Gönpa
- Tibetan Pinyin: Surmang Goinba
- Lhasa IPA: [suːmaŋ kø̃pa]

Chinese name
- Traditional Chinese: 蘇莽貢巴
- Simplified Chinese: 苏莽贡巴
Transcriptions
Standard Mandarin
- Hanyu Pinyin: Sūmǎng Gòngbā

Surmang (or Zurmang) refers to a vast alpine nomadic and farming region, historically a duchy under the King of Nangchen, with vast land holdings spreading over what is today the Tibet Autonomous Region and Qinghai Province. In Tibetan the King of Nangchen's realm was called the "nyishu dza nga" or the 21 (provinces). Since 1959 it is mainly within the Yushu Tibetan Autonomous Prefecture of Qinghai province in China (historically part of Kham, eastern Tibet). Yushu Prefecture is 97% ethnic Tibetan. The Surmang region is one of the poorest regions in China ranking it among the world's highest infant and maternal mortality, almost 100% illiteracy, and personal income of less than US 14¢/day. It is part of the catchment in China of the 30 million ultra-poor.

Surmang also refers to a complex of nine or ten Kagyu monasteries (gompas) in that area. These include: Surmang Namgyal Tse, Surmang Dutsi Til, Surmang Do Gompa, Surmang Doka Gompa, Surmang Kyere Gompa. The lineage held therein, known as the Surmang Kagyu, is a subschool of the Karma Kagyu yet it includes a unique synthesis of Nyingma teachings. They are led historically by the GharTengTrungSum (sum means three), namely the Gharwang tulkus, the Tenga tulkus and Trungpa tülkus.

== Surmang Kagyu ==
=== History ===
Surmang Monastery (Tibetan: ཟུར་མང་དགོན་པ, Wylie: zur mang dgon pa) was founded about 600 years ago by Trungmase, a student of Deshin Shekpa, the 5th Gyalwa Karmapa. The name in Tibetan means "many cornered" referring to the irregularly shaped reed huts used by the first monastics in the area.

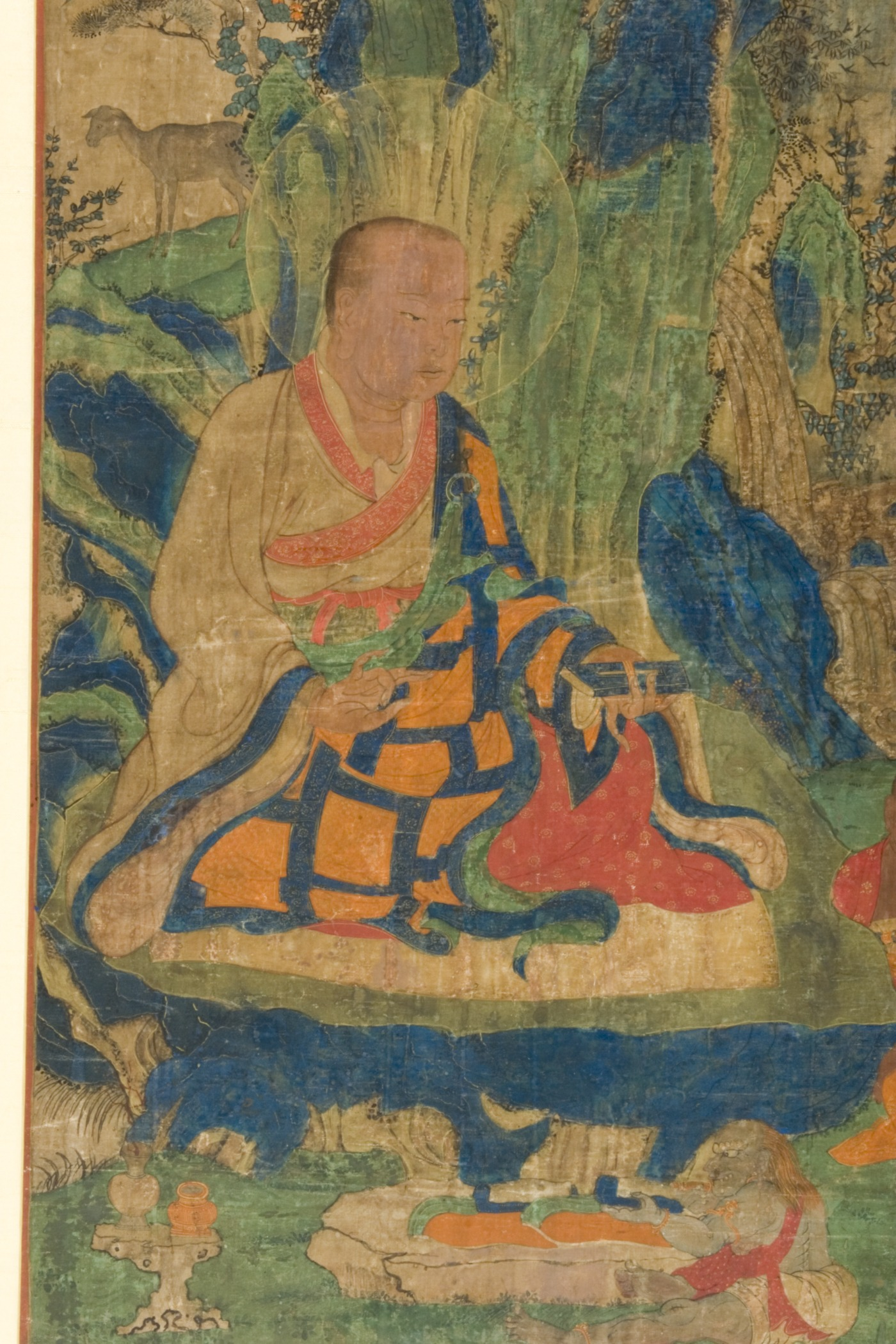
The Arhat Abheda, 17th-century painting from Surmang Monastery

The 1st Trungpa Rinpoche, Kunga Gyaltsen, was a principal student of Trungmase (the 1st Zurmang Gharwang Rinpoche, also well known as Matiratna, or as Lodro Rinchen, which was given by the 5th Gyalwa Karmapa). Small Surmang is the seat of the Surmang Trungpa tulkus, the line of incarnate lamas particularly associated with the sub-complex Dudtsi-til. The Surmang Trungpa Rinpoches was historically the closest students of Trungmase (1st Zurmang Gharwang Rinpoche), along with the eight tongdens (other close students of the founder of the Surmang group). Zurmang Gharwang Rinpoche, Zurmang Tenga Rinpoche and Zurmang Trungpa Rinpoche are together considered the "Three Pillars of Surmang (GharTengTrungSum)."

Accounts of Trungmase and the traditional hierarchy of Surmang differ somewhat. In his autobiography, Born in Tibet, Chogyam Trungpa Rinpoche asserts that Trungmase did not take rebirth, and that the Trungpa tulkus were thereafter traditionally supreme abbots of all of Surmang. However, Trungmase is said to have reincarnated and his line of tulkus is known as the Gharwang tulkus. The Gharwang tulkus have traditionally been the abbots of the main Surmang monastery, Namgyal-tse, and in this role lead the Surmang Kagyu tradition. In 1976 the 16th Gyalwa Karmapa enthroned the 12th Zurmang Gharwang Rinpoche as the 12th incarnation of Trungmase and an emanation of Tilopa.

The Surmang monasteries, through their long history, were exposed to violence. Dudtsi-til Monastery was razed twice by the armies of the Central Government of Tibet, the most recent time being in the 1930s, when the Central Government tried to collect taxes in Tibetan areas of Qinghai.

The Surmang monasteries were again largely destroyed during the Chinese invasion of Tibet and the subsequent Cultural Revolution. In recent years Namgyal-tse has been largely restored under the leadership of the 12th Zurmang Gharwang Rinpoche. Dutsi-til Monastery is being steadily reestablished under the leadership of Sakyong Mipham Rinpoche, the spiritual leader of Shambhala Buddhism and son of Chögyam Trungpa, the 11th Surmang Trungpa. The 2010 Yushu earthquake made it necessary to raze the ancient assembly hall, all of whose costs have been borne exclusively by local support: the monastery, local business community and the Yushu Government. The present regent abbot of Dutsi-til is Aten Rinpoche. The titular head of the monastery is Choseng Trungpa Rinpoche, the 12th Trungpa Tulku.

The three famous Tulkus from Zurmang are well known with the name GharTengTrungSum (Gharwang, Tenga, Trungpa Rinpoche). Zurmang Gharwang Rinpoche II and Zurmang Tenga Rinpoche II are the grandson of TrungMase / Matiratna (1st Zurmang Gharwang Rinpoche).

=== Surmang Foundation ===
Surmang Foundation was founded in 1988 by Lee Weingrad following his trip to the region in 1987, making him the first Westerner to visit the region. In 1991, the Foundation went into partnership with the Dutsi Til Monastery and the Qinghai Provincial Government resulting in the construction of a clinic. The agreement, the first one signed by the Chinese Government with a foundation in Qinghai, opened the door for other foundations in Qinghai, most notably the Konchok Foundation. Since 1991 the foundation provides community development and health services to the region, including support of monks, nuns, and visitors to the facilities at the retreat center of Dorje Khyung Dzong. The Foundation was also responsible for the arrangements and logistics of the 2001 visit of Trungpa Tulku XI's son, Sakyong Mipham Rinpoche.

== Gurdjieff connection theory ==
The Greek-Armenian philosopher and mystic G.I. Gurdjieff claimed that a mysterious Sarmoung monastery was a major source of the teachings he brought to the West. As such, it has never been located, but the Canadian diplomat and Gurdjieffian James George has speculated, on the basis of the similar name and location, that Surmang may be real basis of the Sarmoung monastery.

== See also ==
- Chögyam Trungpa
- Zurmang Gharwang Rinpoche
