= Lion's Roar (magazine) =

Canadian magazine

- Type: Bimonthly
- Format: Magazine
- Owner: Lion's Roar Foundation
- Editor: Melvin McLeod
- Founded: 1993; 33 years ago
- Headquarters: Halifax, Nova Scotia, Canada
- ISSN: 1190-7886
- Website: www.lionsroar.com

Lion's Roar (formerly Shambhala Sun) is an independent, bimonthly magazine (in print and online) that offers a nonsectarian view of "Buddhism, Culture, Meditation, and Life". Presented are teachings from the Buddhist and other contemplative traditions, with an emphasis on applying the principles of mindfulness and awareness practices to everyday life.

== History and profile ==
Launched by Chögyam Trungpa Rinpoche as an internal publication of the Shambhala community, the Sun has evolved from a community newspaper, the Vajradhatu Sun founded in 1978, to a small young magazine, to the largest-circulation Buddhist magazine in the English language.

Established in 1995, the magazine is now a publication of the independent, nonprofit Lion's Roar Foundation.

In 2002, the Sun launched another periodical, Buddhadharma: Practitioner's Quarterly, which is focused strongly on Buddhist practice. Buddhadharma is currently published by the Lion's Roar Foundation.

In 2003, the Shambhala Sun was the most successful Canadian magazine in the United States.

In November 2015, the magazine's name was changed to Lion’s Roar.

Distributed internationally, the magazine is based and published in Halifax, Nova Scotia, Canada.

Lion's Roar has a circulation of 80,000 copies, with a readership of several hundred thousand.

== Notable contributors ==
- Pema Chodron
- The Dalai Lama
- Allen Ginsberg
- Daniel Goleman
- bell hooks
- Pico Iyer
- Amanda Palmer
- Sakyong Mipham Rinpoche
- Gary Snyder
- Chögyam Trungpa Rinpoche
- Robert Thurman
- Alice Walker
- Jon Kabat-Zinn

== Masthead ==
- Editor-in-Chief: Melvin McLeod
- Publisher: Ben Moore

== Awards and critical reception ==
Recent awards include:

- Utne Reader magazine's Alternative Press award for General Excellence and Spiritual Coverage in 1997, 1998, 1999, 2000 and 2007
- Folio magazine’s 2002 Ozzie award for page design
- The 2003 Canadian Newsstand Award for cover design
- The 2005 and 2007 Atlantic Journalism Award for The Atlantic's Best Cover and Best Article.
- In 2005, Shambhala Sun ranked number 29 in the Chicago Tribune's ranking of the 50 best magazines in publication.

Shambhala Sun has received generally positive reviews for its application of Buddhist wisdom to a variety of contemporary topics, including the arts, politics, and health. In 1995, Morris Wolfe of The Globe and Mail wrote that "at its best, Shambahala Sun demonstrates how important, and yet how difficult it is to live in the moment, to see and experience what is in front of us". In 1997, Antonia Zerbisias described the magazine as "thoughtful" and "startlingly original" in a review for the Toronto Star. In 2008, the New York Review of Magazines described the magazine's layout as "elegant, spacious and calming" and the editorial content as "effective".

== See also ==
- Buddhism in the United States
- Tricycle: The Buddhist Review
