= Reginald Ray =

American Buddhist academic and teacher (born 1942)

Reginald Ray (born 1942) is an American Buddhist academic and teacher.

Ray studied Tibetan Buddhism, traditional shamanic wisdom, and yogic-contemplative practices with the Tibetan refugee and recognized Vajrayana traditional-wisdom holder Chögyam Trungpa; and later studied under the tutelage of traditional Dagara teacher from Burkina Faso, Malidoma Somé.

A founding academic member of Naropa University, Ray was a longtime senior teacher in Vajradhatu (renamed Shambhala International in 2000) and from 1996 to 2004 was teacher-in-residence at the Rocky Mountain Shambhala Center (which became Shambhala Mountain Center in February 2000). He left the Shambhala organization to found his own teaching center in 2005, Dharma Ocean. Dhama Ocean, in addition to teaching meditation programs and hosting intensive retreats, is a non-profit foundation "dedicated to the practice, study and preservation of the teachings of Chögyam Trungpa Rinpoche."

== Academic training ==
Ray has a BA in religion from Williams College (1965), and received an M.A. (1967) and Ph.D. (1973) in History of Religions from the University of Chicago Divinity School, where he focused on Buddhism and Indian religions. Among his mentors at Chicago was Mircea Eliade, a Romanian historian of religion.

== Teaching career ==
Ray first encountered his main Buddhist teacher, Chögyam Trungpa Rinpoche, in 1970, and studied with him until Rinpoche's death in 1987. In 1974, at the invitation of Trungpa Rinpoche, Ray left a tenure-track position at Indiana University and relocated to Boulder, Colorado—then the center of Trungpa Rinpoche's community–to become the first full-time faculty member and chair of the Buddhist Studies Department at Naropa University, where he taught until his retirement in July 2009. Ray also served on the Nalanda Translation Committee and held a half-time appointment in the Religious Studies department at the University of Colorado.

From 1996 to 2004, Ray was teacher-in-residence at the Rocky Mountain Dharma Center, which became the Shambhala Mountain Center in February 2000. Ray is the director of the Dharma Ocean Foundation.

== Publications ==
Published books:

- Buddhist Saints in India: A Study in Buddhist Values & Orientations. (1994 Oxford University Press US) (ISBN 0195134834)
- Indestructible Truth, which describes the exoteric traditions of Tibetan Buddhism. (2000 Shambhala Publications) (ISBN 1570621667)
- Secret of the Vajra World explores the esoteric and tantric aspects of Tibetan Buddhism, focusing on the Vajrayana. (2001 Shambhala Publications) (ISBN 157062917X)
- In the Presence of Masters: Wisdom from 30 Contemporary Tibetan Buddhist Teachers. (2004 Shambhala Publications) (ISBN 1570628491)
- Touching Enlightenment: Finding Realization in the Body. (2008 Sounds True) (ISBN 1591796180)
- Tibetan Buddhism Reader, editor. (2010 Shambhala Publications) (ISBN 9781590308349)
- The Awakening Body: Somatic Meditation for Discovering our Deepest Life. (2016 Shambhala Publications) (ISBN 1611803713)
- The Wisdom of Tibetan Buddhism. (2017 Shambhala Publications) (ISBN 1611804752)

Audio recordings:

- Meditating With The Body: Six Tibetan Buddhist Meditations for Touching Enlightenment With the Body (2003 Sounds True) (ISBN 1591790387)
- Buddhist Tantra: Teachings and Practices for Touching Enlightenment With the Body (2003 Sounds True) (ISBN 1591790174)
- Your Breathing Body: Beginning Practices for Physical, Emotional and Spiritual Fulfillment, Volume 1 (2008 Sounds True) (ISBN 1591796598)
- Your Breathing Body, Volume 2 (2008 Sounds True) (ISBN 1591796628)
- Mahamudra for the Modern World (2012 Sounds True) (ISBN 1604075694)
- The Practice of Pure Awareness: Somatic Meditation for Touching Infinity. (2015 Sounds True) (ASIN: B0176O6IDU)
- Somatic Descent: Experiencing the Ultimate Intelligence of the Body. (2016 Sounds True) (ASIN: B01M24YBVS)
- Awakening the Heart: A Somatic Training in Bodhicitta (2017 Sounds True) (ISBN 1604078693)
