= Ōryōki =

Set of nested bowls

Ōryōki is a set of nested bowls and other eating utensils for the personal use of Buddhist monks. Ōryōki also refers to a meditative form of eating using these utensils that originated in Japan and emphasizes mindfulness awareness practice by abiding by a strict order of precise movements.

Most languages directly borrow the Sanskrit word पात्र pātra meaning simply 'bowl'. The Indo-European root *peh₃ carries the meaning of drinking and drinking vessels and is found in numerous related words in modern languages. Chinese and Japanese do have the transliterations from Sanskrit (Chinese: 鉢多羅, romanized: bō duō luó or simply Chinese: 鉢, romanized: bō, and Japanese: はったら, romanized: hattara).

However, the term used in the Sōtō school (曹洞宗) of Zen Buddhism is ōryōki (Japanese: 応量器, from Simplified Chinese: 应量器 or Traditional 應量器, also 応量器, romanized: yīng liàng qì, a novel coinage meaning 'vessel that contains just enough'.

In the Rinzai school (臨済宗) and Ōbaku school (黄檗宗), the utensils are called jihatsu, which is written as 持鉢 (Chinese: 'grasping bowl') according to the Rinzai school and 自鉢 (Chinese: 'personal bowl') according to the Ōbaku school. Jihatsu is also used to refer to the bowls alone.

The bowls are usually made of lacquered wood, with the utensils bundled in a cloth. The largest bowl, sometimes called the Buddha Bowl or zuhatsu, symbolizes the Buddha's head and his wisdom. The other bowls are progressively smaller. In describing the form of ōryōki used at one Western U.S. monastery, a visitor describes the utensils:

The cantaloupe-sized bundle consists of three black plastic nesting bowls, two chopsticks, a wooden spoon, a small rubber spatula, a gray napkin, and a wiping cloth, all of which are wrapped tidily in a gray cloth with a topknot resembling a lotus blossom.

This is the formal style of serving and eating meals practiced in Zen temples.

Buddhist tradition states that after Huineng received the monk's robe and bowl as evidence of his receiving Dharma transmission, the bowl itself was considered a symbol of transmission from teacher to student.

Ōryōki have evolved in vihāra in East Asia over many years and are part of the Buddhist tradition that has now been transmitted to the West. Both monks and laypeople use ōryōki to eat formal meals in Zen monasteries and places of practice. A lineage was also transmitted from Kōbun Chino Otogawa to the Tibetan Buddhist sangha of Chögyam Trungpa and is now practiced at all Shambhala International retreat centers.

Zen teachers say that taking meals with ōryōki cultivates gratitude, mindfulness, and a better understanding of self. (In this regard, it is not unlike zazen.) The intricacies of the form may require the practitioner to pay great attention to detail.

== Meaning of Japanese word ==
According to Shohaku Okumura:

The initial ō in ōryōki means "in proportion to", ryō means "amount" or "quality," and ki means "container."

In Japanese, three Sino-Japanese characters comprise the word ōryōki:

- ō (応), the receiver's response to the offering of food (originally Chinese 'suitable')
- ryō (量), a measure, or an amount, to be received
- ki (器), the bowl.
