= Sakyong Mipham =

Tibetan–American Buddhist teacher (born 1962)

Sakyong Mipham Rinpoche
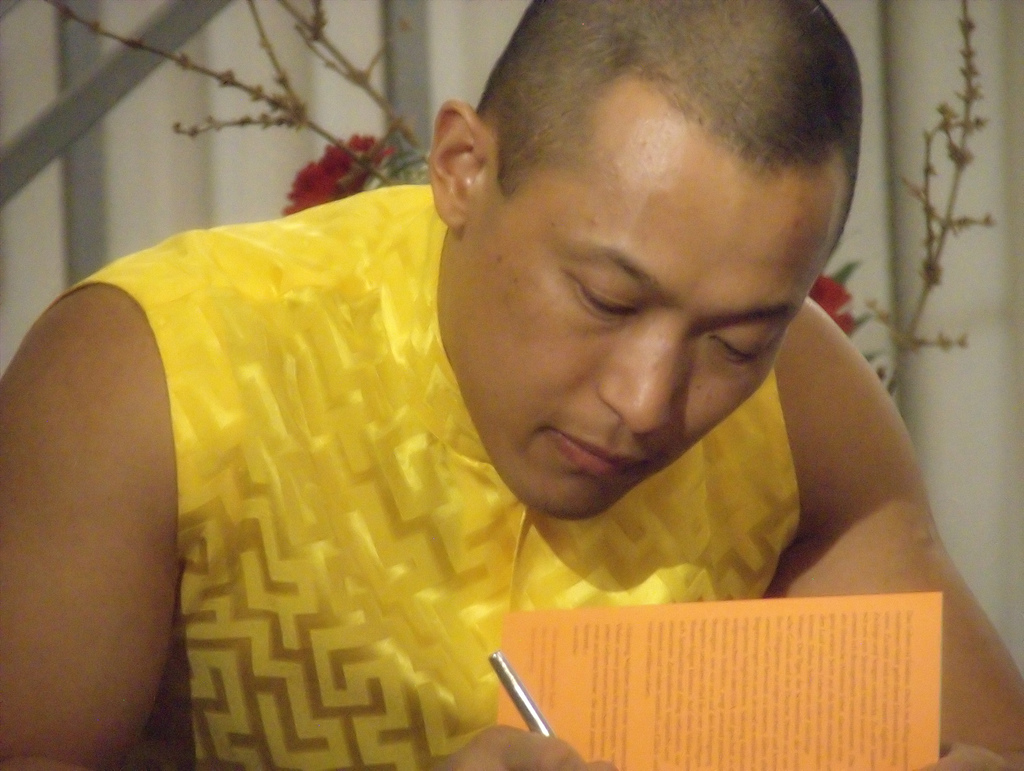
- Title: Sakyong

Personal life
- Born: Ösel Rangdröl Mukpo; November 1962, on the 15th day (Full moon) of the tenth lunar month Bodh Gaya, India
- Spouse: Semo Tseyang Palmo Mukpo, nee Ripa, Dechen Choying Sangmo
- Children: 3 daughters: Jetsun Drukmo Yeshe Sarasvati Ziji Mukpo, Jetsun Yudra Lhamo Yangchen Ziji Mukpo, Jetsun Dzedrön Ökar Yangchen Ziji Mukpo
- Occupation: Author

Religious life
- Religion: Shambhala Training
- Lineage: Sakyong Lineage, Kagyü and Nyingma
- Dharma name: Mipham Lhaga

Senior posting
- Teacher: Chögyam Trungpa Rinpoche, Dilgo Khyentse Rinpoche, Penor Rinpoche (Pema Norbu Rinpoche), Namkha Drimed Rabjam Rinpoche
- Reincarnation: Mipham the Great

- Sakyong Mipham

Tibetan name
- Tibetan: ས་སྐྱོང་མི་ཕམ་
Transcriptions
- Wylie: Sa-skyong Mi-pham

Sakyong Jamgon Mipham Rinpoche, Jampal Trinley Dradül, born Ösel Rangdröl Mukpo (November 1962), is a Tibetan Buddhist master and holder of the Sakyong Lineage of Mukpodong, his family lineage. The Sakyong was recognized by Penor Rinpoche in 1995 as the tülku (reincarnation) of Ju Mipham Gyatso, a Rimé teacher of the late 19th century who said he would be reborn only in the legendary Kingdom of Shambhala.

Ösel Rangdröl Mukpo is the eldest son of Chögyam Trungpa and of Konchok Peldron (1931–2019), a Tibetan bhikṣuṇī (nun) who joined Trungpa's group in 1959 while they escaped from Tibet. He was born in 1962 in Bodh Gaya, India, where Konchok Peldron lived. In 1969, he was sent to Samye Ling Monastery in Scotland, where his father lived, and in 1972 he was brought to North America, where he lived with his father and stepmother Diana Pybus Mukpo. His mother moved to the Tibetan refugee colony and Buddhist center at Bir, India.

In 1979, Trungpa chose the Sakyong as his heir of the Shambala lineage, and he was given the title Sawang (Wyl. sa dbang, "Lord of the Earth"). His mother Lady Konchok Peldron in 1992 joined the Shambhala organization at Karmê Chöling in Vermont, then moved to Boulder, Colorado.

Upon Trungpa's death, the leadership of Vajradhatu was first carried on by his American disciple, appointed Vajra Regent and Dharma heir, Ösel Tendzin (Thomas Rich). By 1990, after Tendzin's death, Sakyong Mipham assumed control of Vajradhatu and Shambhala. Then in 1995 as he was recognized as the tulku of Ju Mipham Gyatso by the 3rd Pema Norbu Rinpoche, Penor Rinpoche also conferred his title as Sakyong (Wyl. sa skyong, "Protector of the Earth"). By 2000, the Vajradhatu and Shambhala organizations joined under the umbrella organization Shambhala International. The Sakyong led Shambhala International, a worldwide network of Buddhist meditation centers, retreat centers, a monastery, and other enterprises.

In July 2018, Sakyong Mipham agreed to step back from his administrative and teaching duties to allow time for an investigation into allegations of sexual misconduct. He resumed teaching in late 2019. He stepped aside from the Shambhala organization in February 2022 after an impasse in which the Shambhala Board of Directors could not agree with the Sakyong Potrang—the organization representing the Sakyong—on a way forward. The Sakyong moved to Nepal, where he teaches his international sangha and offers online teachings.

== Biography ==
Sakyong Mipham was born Ösel Rangdröl Mukpo in Bodh Gaya, India on the 15th day (full moon) of the 10th Lunar month, in November 1962, although his mother was uncertain of the exact Western date. His father, Chögyam Trungpa, was a Buddhist monk who escaped from Tibet in 1959 at age 20. His mother, Könchok Paldrön, was a nun who met Trungpa in 1959 in Tibet and was among those who escaped with him to India. For several years, Mukpo lived with his mother in Bir, a Tibetan refugee colony in northwest India. His father left India in early 1963 to study at Oxford University.

At age seven, he went to live with his father at Samye Ling in Scotland. Ösel was left at Samye Ling in the care of Akong Tulku when his father moved to North America in 1970. Later that year, when Akong traveled to India, he left the boy in the care of Christopher and Pamela Woodman. Diana Mukpo returned to retrieve the boy from the couple who were caring for him near Samye Ling, but they refused to surrender him. British Social Services took custody of Ösel, and he was moved to Pestalozzi Village, a boarding school in East Sussex for displaced children of war conflicts, established before World War II. He resided there until Social Services could conduct a home inspection in the U.S. Ösel was released to his father's custody in 1972 after more than two years of separation in Britain.

Ösel Mukpo has three half-brothers: two by his father and Diana Mukpo, Gesar Mukpo and Tagtrug "Taggie" Mukpo and one, Gyurme Dorje Onchen, by his mother Lady Konchuk Paldron and her husband Lama Pema Gyaltson. He has two stepbrothers, Ashoka Mukpo and David Mukpo, sons of Diana Mukpo and Mitchell Levy.

In 1979, Trungpa performed a ceremony officially investing his son Ösel Rangdröl with the title of Sawang ("Earth Lord"). This confirmed Ösel as his Shambhala heir and the future Sakyong. After his father's death in 1987, the Sawang began his studies with Dilgo Khyentse Rinpoche in Nepal, which continued until the Mahasiddah's death. At that time, at Khyentse's instruction, Mukpo began his studies with Pema Norbu Rinpoche (Penor Rinpoche) in India, where he attended Shedra at Namdrolling Monastery and continued to oversee the Vajradhatu community. The Sakyong spent six months each year in the east in his studies, and six months in the west relating to the sangha.

When Trungpa's Regent Ösel Tendzin died in 1990, the 27-year-old Sawang was acknowledged by Jamgön Kongtrül Rinpoche and Dilgo Khyentse Rinpoche as Trungpa's successor in the Kagyu, Nyingma, and Shambhala lineages and head of the Vajradhatu organization. Upon discovering that Trungpa had given the boy the name Mipham Lhaga, Penor Rinpoche recognized him as the tulku of Jamgon Ju Mipham Gyatso, Mipham the Great, and in May 1995 he was formally enthroned by Penor Rinpoche as Sakyong. Since then, he has been known by the title Sakyong Mipham Rinpoche.

After assuming the leadership of Vajradhatu in 1990, the Sakyong completed his training under the guidance of Dilgo Khyentse Rinpoche and Penor Rinpoche. As he took his seat as Chödak [(Tib. ཆོས་བདག, Wyl. chos bdag), or custodian of a terma cycle] and holder of his father's Shambhala Terma cycle, the Sakyong began moving the sangha to practice this cycle of teachings. He began by talking about the singularity of the Shambhala teachings and Buddhism, which had previously been taught separately. Shambhala Training had often been called a "secular" path.

In 2002 the Sakyong began running. His first marathon was Toronto in 2003. He trained and ran in nine marathons, including Big Sur, Chicago, and the New York and Boston Marathons in 2005.

In 2005 the Sakyong met and married Semo Tseyang Palmo Ripa, daughter of the Tibetan Buddhist Terton Namkha Drimed Rabjam Ripa Rinpoche, a Nyingma master and holder of the Ripa family lineage, who is also seen as the manifestation of Atara Sale. They met when Penor Rinpoche invited the Gesar Lingdro dancers to perform at Namdroling monastery, where the Sakyong was studying. The Sakyong's mother also knew the Ripa family and had close ties to the bride's paternal uncle, though the Sakyong did not meet them until this time.

In late 2008 and early 2009 the Sakyong received the Rinchen Terdzo, the complete cycle of terma teachings of the Nyingma school of Buddhism, from Namkha Drimed Rinpoche in Orissa, India. This cycle of teachings had been given to Namkha Drimed Rinpoche by Trungpa in Tibet.

In 2009 he began teaching the Scorpion Seal terma, the highest teachings of the Shambhala lineage, to more than 2,000 students. For the next several years he taught extensively on these deep teachings at the four Shambhala retreat centers, Shambhala Mountain Center in Colorado, Karme Choling in Vermont, Dorje Denma Ling in Nova Scotia, and Dechen Choling in France. He continued to write and teach on this cycle until 2018.

In 2010, his first daughter, Jetsun Drukmo Yeshe Sarasvati Ziji Mukpo, was born. 2010 was also a year of deep retreat and writing for the Sakyong. His father had died at the age of 47, and he marked this milestone by going into retreat in Nepal.

While on retreat he wrote volumes of practices and commentaries on the Buddhadharma and his father's Shambhala teachings. The Sakyong came out of retreat to teach, including giving an empowerment at Shambhala Mountain Center in the summer of 2010, and then returned to teaching full time in 2012. Namkha Drimed Rinpoche also bestowed the Nyingma Kama empowerments on the Sakyong, which represent the oral transmission the Nyingma received from India from the time of their arrival in Tibet.

The Sakyong received the Gongter, or Mind Terma of the Terton, Namkha Drimed Rinpoche in the fall of 2015. This Gongter of Gesar of Ling teachings is the largest terma cycle of Gesar in the world.

Sakyong Mipham has written several books, including the national bestseller Turning the Mind into an Ally, Ruling Your World, Running with the Mind of Meditation, The Shambhala Principle, and The Lost Art of Conversation. His most recent book, Garuda 108 Poems, was released in 2019. In 2018, he stepped back from all teaching and administrative duties to allow for an investigation and public discussion of his alleged sexual misconduct. He resumed teaching with a small group of students in the Netherlands late in 2019, and then in March 2020, instructing a group of 108 students in Nepal. His teachings have continued regularly in person and online since then.

== Shift in Shambhala ==
In 2000, the Sakyong began talking about Shambhala Buddhism as a single entity and path, with no separation between spiritual and secular. In 2004 at Vajrayana seminary at Shambhala Mountain Center, he received and introduced the Primordial Rigden Ngondro, titled the Magical Heart of Shambhala. The next year, he held the first Rigden Abhisheka, an empowerment to practice the Vajrayana teachings of Shambhala. Later that year, thangka painter Cynthia Moku, under the Sakyong's direction, released the first Thangka of the Primoridal Rigden deity.

The changes to the Shambhala curriculum and the introduction of the Shambhala teachings as a Buddhist path led to some confusion in the community. Many thought the Sakyong misunderstood what his father had intended with these teachings. There were complaints about the replacement of the primary thangka of Vajradhara with the Primordial Rigden from the organization's meditation centers. The curriculum was also changing as older programs Trungpa initiated were replaced by shorter, more accessible ones. The Sakyong also stopped teaching his father's Kagyu teachings, which he held and had offered through the 1990s.

In 2009 the Sakyong sent a letter to the community providing guidelines and restrictions on inviting teachers from other lineages to teach at Shambhala centers. This, he said, was to help us "know who we are" as a community. Students saw this as another change from how his father had done things. In response, older students began to migrate to other teachers who taught Trungpa's Kagyu practices. Many resented the direction in which he took the organization. By the time of the #MeToo sexual abuse scandals, older students had decided that they were following the Shambhala Vajrayana of the Sakyong, or had found other teachers.

== Controversies ==
In 2018, Buddhist Project Sunshine, an organization founded as a survivors' network for former Shambhala Buddhist members, reported multiple allegations of sexual assault in the Shambhala community. In response, and to allow time for the community to investigate these accusations, Sakyong Mipham temporarily stepped aside as leader, and the Shambhala governing council resigned and appointed an interim Board of Directors and a Process Team. Sakyong Mipham issued a letter to the community, saying:

some of these women have shared experiences of feeling harmed as a result of these relationships. I am now making a public apology. In addition, I would like you to know that over the years, I have apologized personally to people who have expressed feeling harmed by my conduct, including some of those who have recently shared their stories. I have also engaged in mediation and healing practices with those who have felt harmed. Thus I have been, and will continue to be, committed to healing these wounds.

In July 2018, Naropa Institute removed Sakyong Mipham from its board following the allegations of sexual misconduct.

In August 2018, Buddhist Project Sunshine released another report containing further allegations against Sakyong Mipham that included sexual encounters with minors, a charge the Sakyong has denied. In December 2018, the Larimer County, Colorado Sheriff's Office opened an investigation of the allegations of sexual assault. The investigation was closed in February 2020, with no charges being filed.

In February 2019, Shambhala International's interim governing council issued a report by Wickwire Holm, a Canadian law firm, that detailed two credible allegations of sexual misconduct against Sakyong Mipham. Later that month, six members of his Kusung, the Shambhala body protectors, wrote an open letter corroborating a pattern of physical and sexual misconduct and other concerns. Sakyong Mipham subsequently said he would cease teaching for the "foreseeable future".

He returned to teaching in March 2020, leading a pilgrimage to Nepal and instructing a group of 108 students. In September 2020, The Walrus published an investigative report detailing a culture of abuse dating back to early days of the Shambhala Buddhist organization, with all three leaders of the organization, including its founder, Chögyam Trungpa, having been credibly accused of sexual misconduct and abuse of power.

== Lineage of Sakyongs ==
The Lineage of Sakyongs is the Mukpo family lineage of Chögyam Trungpa. The Sakyong is the second in the family to hold this title and has the responsibility of propagating the teachings of Shambhala. This tradition emphasizes confidence in the basic goodness of all beings and teaches courageous self-rulership based on wisdom and compassion. The term "Sakyong" literally means "earth-protector" in Tibetan. Sakyongs are regarded as chögyals (Sanskrit dharmarajas)—"kings of truth" or "dharma kings"—who combine the spiritual and worldly paths. This Shambhala path is specifically meant for lay practitioners.

In Tibetan Buddhism, the first Dharmaraja of Shambhala, Dawa Sangpo, was said to have been empowered directly by the Buddha. Dawa Sangpo recognized that he could not give up his throne and responsibilities to pursue the path of a monastic. Thus he requested teachings that could allow him to continue to rule his kingdom while practicing the dharma.

The Blazing Jewel of Sovereignty is the ritual empowerment for the Sakyong. Trungpa was the first in this lineage of Sakyongs to receive this empowerment. He is called the "Druk Sakyong", or "Dragon Earth-Protector". He received this ritual empowerment from Dilgo Khyentse Rinpoche in Boulder, Colorado.

Sakyong Mipham was first empowered as "Sawang" by his father in 1979. The empowerment of the Blazing Jewel of Sovereignty was conferred upon him by Penor Rinpoche in May 1995.

In April 2023, this empowerment was bestowed upon Sakyong Mipham Rinpoche's eldest daughter, Jetsun Drukmo Rinpoche, who will succeed him as lineage heir.

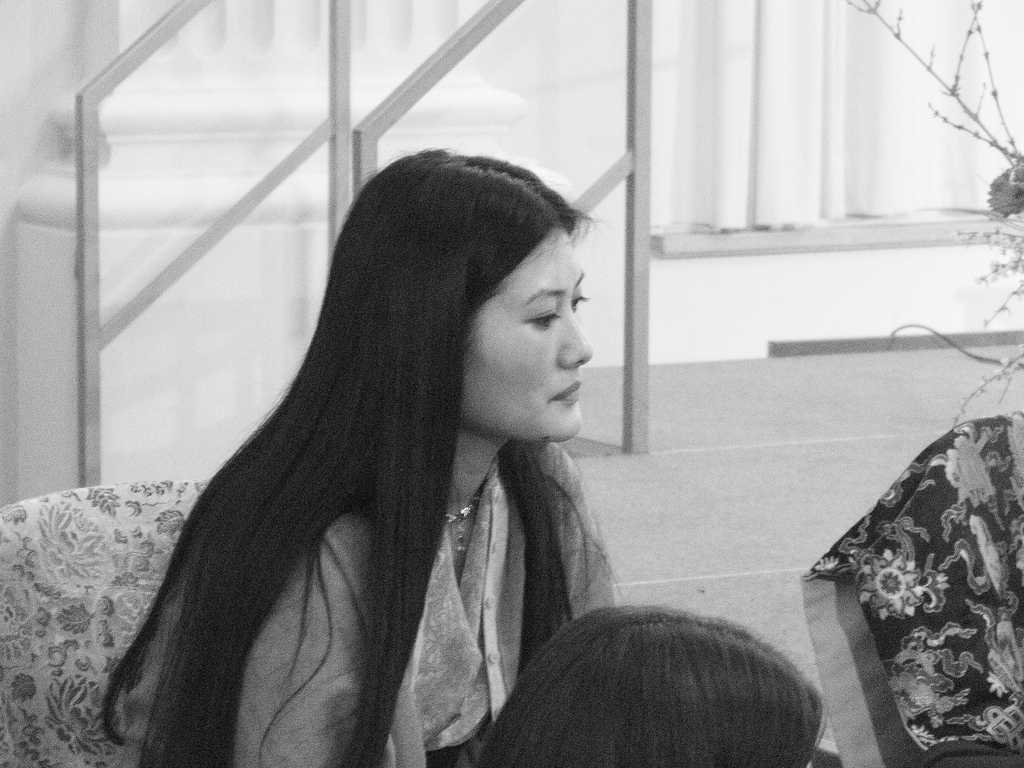
Sakyong Mipham's wife Khandro Tseyang. (Credits)

== Family ==
=== Sakyong Wangmo and family ===
The Sakyong's consort is called the Sakyong Wangmo. The current Sakyong Wangmo is Sakyong Mipham's wife Khandro Tseyang Ripa Mukpo, the daughter of Terton Namkha Drimed Rabjam. The Sakyong and Sakyong Wangmo married in a public ceremony on 10 June 2006 in Halifax, Nova Scotia. Khandro Tseyang was officially empowered as Sakyong Wangmo by Penor Rinpoche at a ceremony in Halifax in August 2008. The Sakyong and Sakyong Wangmo have three daughters. The first, Drukmo Yeshe Sarasvati Ziji Mukpo (Lady Dragon Wisdom), was born on 11 August 2010. The second, Jetsun Yudra Lhamo Yangchen Ziji Mukpo, was born 12 March 2013. The third, Dzedrön Ökar Yangchen Ziji Mukpo, was born on 10 April 2015.

== Bibliography ==
=== Books ===
- Garuda: 108 Poems, Kalapa Publications, 2019
- The Lost Art of Good Conversation, Harmony Books, 2017, ISBN 9780451499431
- The Vow: Illuminating the Sun and Moon, Dragon, Shambhala Media, 2014
- The Shambhala Principle: Discovering Humanity's Hidden Treasure, Harmony Books, 2013, ISBN 0770437435
- The Supreme Thought: Bodhichitta and the Enlightened Society Vow, Dragon, Shambhala Media, 2013, ISBN 9781550550542
- Running with the Mind of Meditation: Lessons for Training Body and Mind, Harmony Books, 2012, ISBN 0307888169
- Treatise on Enlightened Society, Dragon, Shambhala Media, 2012, ASIN B082891BNL
- Ruling Your World: Ancient Strategies for Modern Life, Morgan Road Books, 2005, ISBN 0-7679-2065-1
- Snow Lion's Delight: 108 Poems, Vajradhatu Books, 2005, ISBN 9781550550221
- Turning the Mind into an Ally, Riverhead Books, 2004, ISBN 1-57322-345-X
- Taming the Mind and Walking the Bodhisattva Path, Vajradhatu Publications, 1999, ASIN B000JI0B9S
- Smile of the Tiger, Vajradhatu Books, 1998, ISBN 978-1550550115

=== Articles ===
- Mahayana Motivation in Lion's Roar, February 2, 2018.
- Why We Must Practice the Art of Good Communication in Tricycle Magazine, January 16, 2018.
- Path Through Obstacles in Lion's Roar, November 6, 2017.
- Slow Down You Move too Fast in Lion's Roar, August 20, 2017.
- How to Practice Mindfulness in Lion's Roar, July 28, 2017.
- The Myth of Permanence in Lion's Roar, June 13, 2017.
- Just Leap in Lion's Roar, June 10, 2017.
- It's Not Us and Them in Lion's Roar, June 3, 2017.
- Shamatha Meditation: Training the Mind in Lion's Roar, April 17, 2017.
- Going at Our Own Pace on the Path of Meditation in Lion's Roar, March 29, 2017.
- Confined by Cowardice in Lion's Roar, March 29, 2017.
- True Listening in Lion's Roar, October 14, 2016.
- Deep Seeing in Lion's Roar, September 2, 2016.
- Running Into Meditation in Lion's Roar, August 23, 2016 .
- A Simple Sense of Delight in Lion's Roar, June 3, 2016.
- Let it Shine in Lion's Roar, .May 25, 2016
- Obstacles on the Path in Shambhala Sun, July 13, 2014.
- Let Your Confidence Shine in Shambhala Sun, June 30, 2014.
- Who Are We, Really? in Shambhala Sun, May 1, 2014.
- The Great Vow in Shambhala Sun, September 1, 2013.
- The Great Reversal in Shambhala Sun, July 1, 2013.
- Are We Basically Good in Shambhala Sun, May 5, 2013.
- The Supreme Thought in Shambhala Sun, March 7, 2013.
- We Need to be Warriors in Shambhala Sun, November 15, 2012.
- The Power of Self-Reflection in Shambhala Sun, May 9, 2012.
- Stop, Relax, Wake Up in Shambhala Sun, January 19, 2012.
- Joined at the Heart in Shambhala Sun, November 29, 2011.
- In Sync in Shambhala Sun, August 2, 2011.
- Sunny Side Up in Shambhala Sun, May 24, 2011.
- Love and Emptiness in Shambhala Sun, November 17, 2010.
- Lost in Shambhala Sun, September 1, 2010.
- What Turns the Wheel in Shambhala Sun, July 19, 2010.
- Time to be Pragmatic in Shambhala Sun, May 1, 2010.
- How to be a Peacemaker in Shambhala Sun, March 1, 2010.
- Peace in the Fast Lane in Shambhala Sun, January 1, 2010.
- Ready, Steady, Go in Shambhala Sun, September 1, 2009.
- The Jewel You Carry with You. in Shambhala Sun, May 1, 2009.
- How Will I Use This Day? in Shambhala Sun, February 1, 2009.
- Contemplating Compassion in Shambhala Sun, July 1, 2008.
- There's No "I" in Happy in Shambhala Sun, March 1, 2007.
- From Seed to Bloom in Shambhala Sun, January 1, 2007.
- It's All in the Mind in Shambhala Sun, November 2006.
- Good Mind in Shambhala Sun, September 1, 2006.
- The Wish Fulfilling Jewel in Shambhala Sun, July 1, 2006
- The Mind of the Dragon and the Power of Non-Self in Shambhala Sun, November 1, 2005
- A Reign of Goodness in Shambhala Sun, September 1, 2005
- No Real Winners in Shambhala Sun, July 1, 2005
- Waves of Compassion in Shambhala Sun, May 1, 2005
- No Complaints in Shambhala Sun, November 1, 2004
- Harness the Wind in Shambhala Sun, September 1, 2004
- Make your Decisions for Others in Shambhala Sun, July 1, 2004
- Seeing Wisdom as the Essence of Phenomena in Shambhala Sun, May 1, 2004
- End Blame in Shambhala Sun, March 1, 2004
- Personal Practice in Shambhala Sun, January 1, 2004
- A Courageous Activity in Shambhala Sun, September 1, 2003
- A Healthy Sense of Self in Shambhala Sun, July 1, 2003
- Nine Stages to Training the Mind in Shambhala Sun, May 1, 2003
- Taking the First Step in Shambhala Sun, November 1, 2002
- Looking in All the Wrong Places in Shambhala Sun, September 1, 2002
- Riding the Energy of Basic Goodness in Shambhala Sun, July 1, 2002
- The Buddha's Bravery in Shambhala Sun, March 1, 2002
- The Great Stupa Which Liberates Upon Seeing in Shambhala Sun, January 1, 2002
- Take the Big View in Shambhala Sun, November 1, 2001
- Using the Power of Thought in Shambhala Sun, September 1, 2001
- Did You Hear? in Shambhala Sun, July 1, 2001
- Meditation and Post Meditation in Shambhala Sun, May 1, 2001
- Do I Exist or Not? in Shambhala Sun, March 1, 2001
- How We Make Ourselves Suffer in Shambhala Sun, January 1, 2001
- What is this Thing Called Mind in Shambhala Sun, November 1, 2000
- Becoming a Buddhist in Shambhala Sun, September 1, 2000
- Endless Migration in Shambhala Sun, July 1, 2000
- Wisdom in the Words in Shambhala Sun, March 1, 2000
- Meditation is the Practice of Being Alive in Shambhala Sun, July 1, 1994

== See also ==
- Rigden kings
