= Drala =

Drala may refer to:

- Drala, the Fijian name for Erythrina variegata
- Drala, a class of minor deity in Tibetan folk religion
- Drala, music composed to accompany hatha yoga
