= Spiritual warrior =

Term in Tibetan Buddhism

The term spiritual warrior is used in Tibetan Buddhism for one who combats the universal enemy: self-ignorance (avidya), the ultimate source of suffering according to Buddhist philosophy. Different from other paths, which focus on individual salvation, the spiritual warrior's only complete and right practice is that which compassionately helps other beings with wisdom. This is the Bodhisattva ideal (the "Buddha-in-waiting"), the spiritual warrior who resolves to attain buddhahood in order to liberate others. The term is also used generically in esotericism and self-help literature. Spiritual warrior, "illuminated heart and valiant one", "enlightenment hero", "one who aspires for enlightenment" or, "heroic being" has been defined as a bodhisattva.

== Tibetan origins ==
In Tibet a monastic rule derived from a feudal warrior clan society, which was transformed into a spiritual warrior society. While the rest of the world followed feudalistic warrior development during the medieval period throughout Europe and Asia, Tibet uniquely established Lamaism. This was centered around a Buddhism finding root in Tibet. The Lama (teacher) is a living Buddha for Tibetans who provides a powerful bridge between real and imaginary consciousness worlds, where the self is methodically dissolved into the whole's benefit by tantra practice.

Tibetans imported this order to help change their society to one based on education, social welfare, peaceful progress, with a self-renouncing monastic class of rulers. The monastic sangha (community) were supported and organized like a military; however, they were set on a self-discovery yogic mission for reconnaissance to perfect and develop methods in eliminating ego suffering.

Tibetan Buddhists advanced a form of a non-hereditary succession of title and land-based on reincarnation, which presented living proof that their methods succeeded by extraordinary means. It also ensured that young leaders were well-trained in the monastic canon and it avoided deadly heir feuds seen in the heritable practices within feudalism. Tibetan monastics eschewed materialistic and economic progress for want of virtual visualizations. Monastic warriors were focused on accepting and perpetuating life in contrast to defending or attacking it.

In a highly celebrated and unique victory, Tibetan monastic warriors overcame the native Bon practices which then encompassed services for all of life's needs (birth, marriage, healthcare, death, and spirit exorcism) by incorporating them into their own practices. New Buddhist spiritual technology was integrated with the existing Bon methods, as contrasted with oppression methods seen in other warrior techniques. Transformation and re-purposing of military-warrior symbolism and strategy into new codified tactics within Buddhist practice was a recurring metaphorical theme.

The society flourished to produce one of the best assemblies of peaceful enlightened self-knowledge known to humankind. When modern Chinese communist military-economic industrial forces swept in to dismantle and uproot it based on monarchic upheaval, this caused a spread of the seeds of this spiritual warrior way throughout the rest of the world, which are now taking root in new democratic forms. Displaced Tibetans tend to remain loyal to their exiled leaders and lineage of teachers.

== Chogyam Trungpa ==
Chogyam Trungpa teaches the way of the spiritual warrior. In 1976, Trungpa established the Shambhala Training program on spiritual warrior-ship grounded in sitting meditation practice. The Sacred Path of the Warrior is Trungpa's book which embodies the practice.

“Warrior-ship here does not refer to making war on others. Aggression is the source of our problems, not the solution. Here the word “warrior” is taken from the Tibetan “pawo,” which literally means, “one who is brave.” ... "And now here is my secret, a very simple secret: It is only with the heart that one can see rightly, what is essential is invisible to the eye."

— Chogyam Trungpa

The spiritual warrior archetype helps to constructively answer questions about aggression and competition in a healthy direction. Unlike the soldier character, the spiritual warrior is in touch with the joy, the sadness, the expansiveness in their heart; able to share and give it to others. The warrior knows about death and seizes the day. They have learned to let go with forgiveness and avoids chasing others in revenge. The warrior commits to growing the heart and soul in becoming a creative being. The warrior serves in love of strangers and gives generously while giving to themselves. The spiritual warrior seeks to change others with rational and compassionate decision-making in service of a higher goal.

== Dudjom Rinpoche ==
In Dudjom Jigdral Yeshe Dorje's Nyingma history, spiritual warrior (sems-dpa', Skt sattva), is a technical term applied to bodhisattvas, Subhuti, Vajrasattva, Manjusri, Samantabhadra, Sakya Jugne and Tsangtonpa. Great spiritual warriors have inserted doctrinal treasures into mountains, ravines and woods.

== See also ==
- Bodhisattva
- Shambhala Buddhism
- The Dharma of Star Wars
