= Drala Mountain Center =

Retreat center in Red Feather Lakes, Colorado

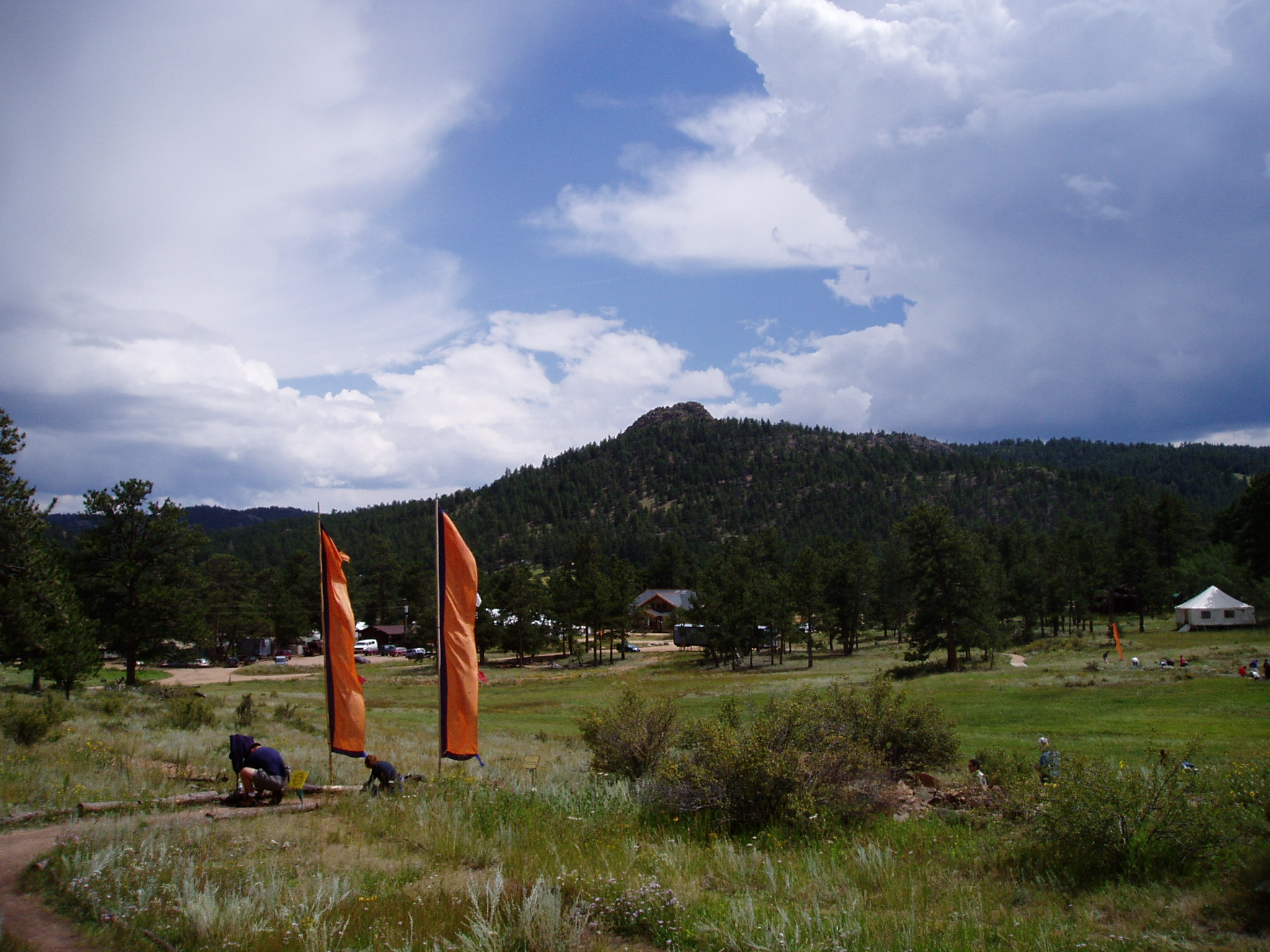
- Predecessor: Vajradhatu
- Formation: February 2000
- Type: 501c3 educational non-profit
- Location: Red Feather Lakes, Colorado
- Coordinates: 40°44′N 105°32.5′W
- Website: www.dralamountain.org
- Formerly called: Shambhala Mountain Center

Drala Mountain Center (DMC) is a 501c3 educational non-profit originally founded in 2000 as the Shambhala Mountain Center, with the name changing to DMC in 2022. It operates a spiritual retreat center located on 600 acres in a valley in the northern Colorado Rocky Mountains. The center hosts Shambhala Training meditation programs as well as yoga instruction, leadership training, children's programs, and various longer term retreats.

Drala Mountain Center also draws visitors who come to see the Great Stupa of Dharmakaya, a religious building which houses the remains of Chögyam Trungpa Rinpoche, the Tibetan teacher who founded the new religious movement of which Drala Mountain Center is a part. The center also has a Shinto shrine dedicated to Amaterasu-Ōmikami.

Trungpa's son, Sakyong Mipham Rinpoche, was the spiritual head of Shambhala Mountain Center from 2000 to 2022, when sexual misconduct scandals and organizational conflict caused the parent organization of Shambhala International to officially splinter. At that time DMC renamed itself, and has faced challenges in recent years due to financial strain, forest fire, the COVID-19 pandemic, and the ongoing sexual misconduct scandals. These scandals include allegations of sexual misconduct by both previous spiritual heads of the Shambhala organization: Chögyam Trungpa and Ösel Tendzin.

== History ==
The property is located in the Red Feather Lakes area of Colorado on 600 acres (2.4 km^{2}) in the foothills west of Fort Collins. The geographic coordinates are 40°44′N 105°32.5′W. The land was originally developed as the Rocky Mountain Dharma Center, founded by Chögyam Trungpa Rinpoche in 1971, and operated by his organization, Vajradhatu. The center has 35,000 square feet (3,300 m^{2}) of building space for meditation, dharma talks, programs, and lodging.

In 2000, after Sakyong Mipham started the process of enclosing the previously secular teachings of Shambhala within the container of a new Buddhist lineage, Shambhala Buddhism, Trungpa's original Vajradhatu organization was renamed Shambhala International and the retreat center was incorporated separately as a 501c3 educational non-profit named Shambhala Mountain Center. The new center was independent of Shambhala International with limited oversight from the Sakyong Potrang, an organization representing Sakyong Mipham.

In August 2001, a 108 feet (33 m) tall stupa was consecrated as the Great Stupa of Dharmakaya. The fourteen-year process of building the stupa on the property began after the death of Trungpa in 1987. It is noted on the stupa and is common knowledge among Shambhala practitioners who have visited center that Trungpa's relics are permanently entombed in the stupa following Tibetan Buddhist tradition.

Beginning in 2017, Shambhala Mountain Center worked with the Fort Collins Conservation District to restore 118 acres of forest to the state it was back in the mid to late 1800s, intending to increase understory biodiversity and fire resilience.

In 2018, multiple reports of clergy sexual misconduct and power abuse by the then head of Shambhala International, Sakyong Mipham, as well as other Shambhala teachers, led to an institutional crisis for Shambhala International and its land centers, as well as for Shambhala Mountain Center. Shambhala Mountain Center issued a statement in 2018 stating that they stood with the women who came forward with allegations, and that Sakyong Mipham was not welcome to teach at the center until he had gone through a process of accountability, which they said had not yet occurred. The Larimer County Sheriff's Office opened an investigation into alleged misconduct at Shambhala Mountain Center in 2018 that was later closed with no charges filed.

In December 2019, a report of inappropriate sexual and racist behavior towards a female college student by a teacher at Shambhala Mountain Center during a course which took place that winter, which also made other students uncomfortable, led Chapman University to suspend its usual courses there. The center responded by dismissing the teacher the night the incident was reported and apologized to the student for the incident.

In the fall of 2020 the Cameron Peak Fire burned 14 Shambhala Mountain Center structures, but part of its northeastern expansion stopped on DMC land as a direct result of DMC's forest management. DMC damages were estimated to be $2 million.

In October 2021, Shambhala Mountain Center fully separated itself legally and financially from the Sakyong Potrang and established a self-governing board of directors.

In February 2022, the center changed its name to Drala Mountain Center, after the Tibetan Buddhist term drala, citing Chogyam Trungpa Rinpoche's translation of the word as "energy beyond aggression". On February 28, 2022, Drala Mountain Center filed for Chapter 11 bankruptcy protection, citing the 2018 clergy sexual misconduct scandal, the Cameron Peak Fire and COVID-19 as contributing factors.
