= Shambhala: The Sacred Path of the Warrior =

Book by Chögyam Trungpa

- Author: Chögyam Trungpa
- Language: English
- Genre: Tibetan Buddhism
- Publisher: Shambhala Publications
- Publication date: 1984
- Publication place: United States
- Media type: Print (Paperback)
- Pages: 227 pp (first edition)
- ISBN: 978-1-59030-451-8

Shambhala: The Sacred Path of the Warrior is a book concerning the Shambhala Buddhist vision of founder Chögyam Trungpa. The book discusses addressing personal and societal problems through the application of secular concepts such as basic goodness, warriorship, bravery, happiness as a means toward the creation of what he calls "enlightened society". Shambhala vision is described as a nonreligious approach rooted in meditation and accessible to individuals of any, or no, religion. In Shambhala terms, it is possible, moment by moment, for individuals to establish enlightened society.
