= Great Stupa of Dharmakaya =

Coordinates: 40.72771°N 105.54092°W

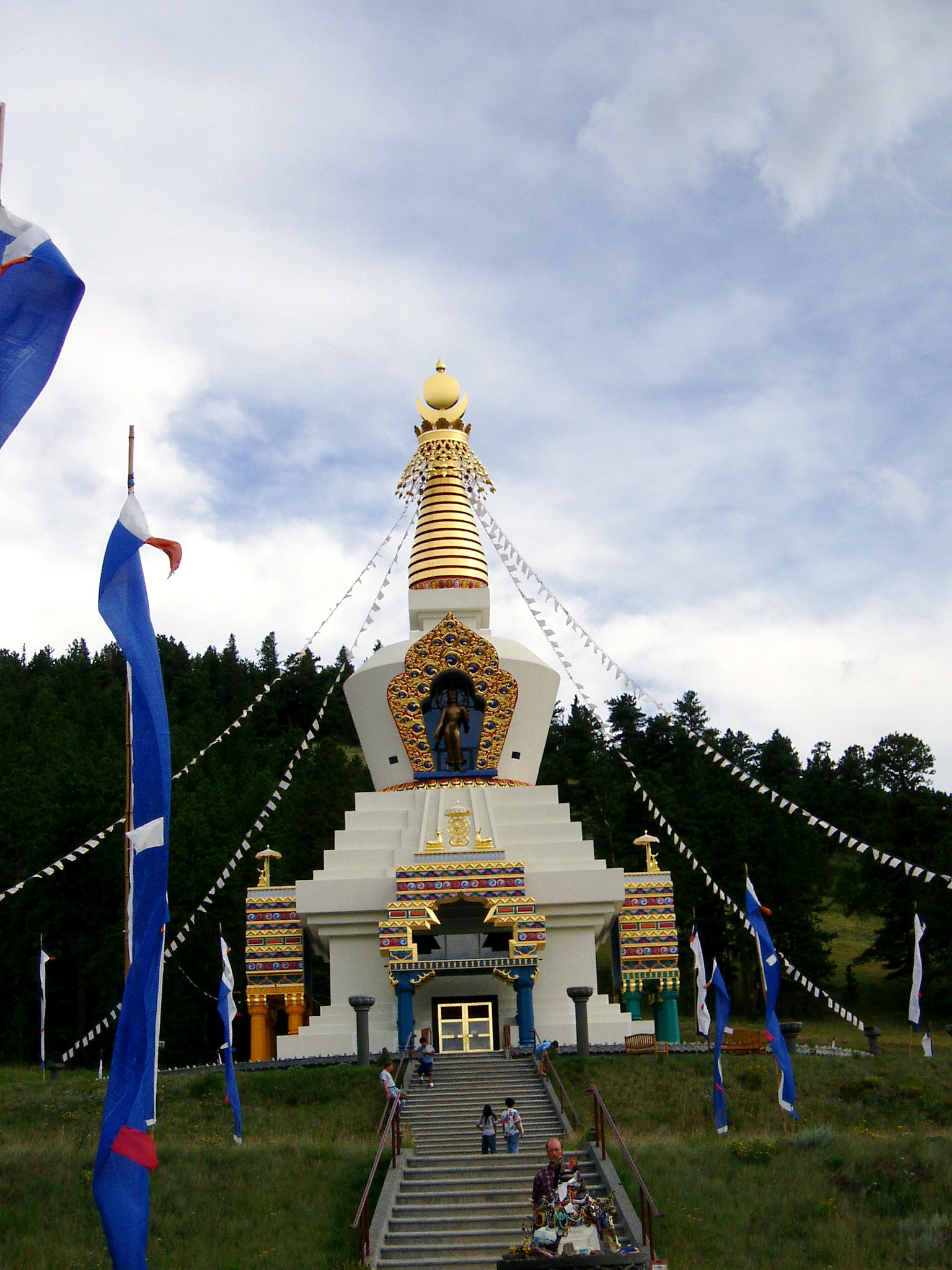
The Great Stupa of Dharmakaya Which Liberates Upon Seeing

The Great Stupa of Dharmakaya, officially the Great Stupa of Dharmakaya Which Liberates Upon Seeing, is a Buddhist temple located at Drala Mountain Center in Colorado, in the United States.

It was built to inter the ashes of Chogyam Trungpa, who died in 1987. In many Buddhist traditions it is common to build a stupa to honour a respected teacher after their death. The site of the Great Stupa of Dharmakaya was first identified as an auspicious location by the 16th Karmapa, head of the Kagyü school of Tibetan Buddhism, on his first visit to North America in 1974.

Construction of the stupa began in 1988. The structure took thirteen years to complete and used a special concrete formula designed to last one thousand years. The Stupa was consecrated in a ceremony that lasted several days in the summer of 2001. This ceremony was attended by many important lamas and students of Chogyam Trungpa.

In September 2006, The Dalai Lama visited the Great Stupa for the first time.
