= Dechen Chöling =

Coordinates: 45.8564°N 1.0626°E

Dechen Chöling is the residential practice center of the European Shambhala Buddhist community. The center sits in a land of rolling meadows near Limoges, France.

Dechen Chöling is a part of Shambhala Europe - a network of more than 45 urban meditation centres and groups - and of Shambhala International, a worldwide network of 140 urban centers and seven residential practice centres. Shambhala Buddhism joins the legacy of Tibetan Buddhism with the Shambhala tradition of Chogyam Trungpa.

The centre sits in a land of rolling meadows and trees near Limoges, France. People from around the world come to learn and practice meditation, and to relax. Throughout the year, Dechen Chöling offers programmes ranging from basic meditation and contemplative arts to advanced Buddhist and Shambhala teachings taught by renowned teachers.
