= Gangshar Wangpo =

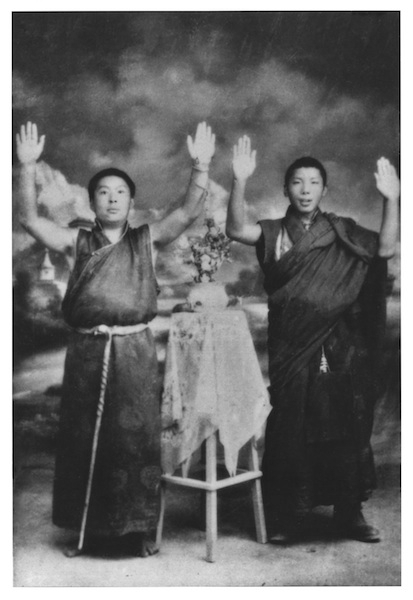
Khenpo Gangshar (left) and Chögyam Trungpa

Khenpo Gangshar Wangpo (b. 1925-?) was a highly respected lama in Eastern Tibet and one of the primary teachers of Chögyam Trungpa Rinpoche (the 11th Trungpa tulku) and the 9th Thrangu Rinpoche. Khenpo Gangshar was trained in Shechen Monastery, a monastic center established in the end of the seventeenth century and part of the Mindröling lineage within the Nyingma tradition of Tibetan Buddhism.

Khenpo Gangshar was a primary teacher for Trungpa Rinpoche from the age of 13 until presiding over Trungpa Rinpoche's kyorpön and khenpo degree examinations at the end of 1957. He was also referred to as a "crazy saint". Multiple accounts refer to a serious illness which transformed him from a more quiet monk to an unconventional teacher who renounced his vows, entered into a romantic relationship, and often acted strangely or outrageously. Pema Chödrön credits Khenpo Gangshar with teachings such as "meditate on whatever provokes resentment".

== History ==
According to Chögyam Trungpa in his account in Born in Tibet, Gangshar Rinpoche was tutored by Jamgon Kongtrul the Second of Shechen Monastery. This began when Gangshar's father died and his mother became a nun. Kongtrul then raised him as his spiritual son, and he became one of six senior professors at Shechen Monastery. Trungpa Rinpoche describes first visiting them both when he was 13 years old, when his studies were to begin in Shechen and a six-month Rinchen Terzod transmission began. Khenpo Gangshar was assigned as his first tutor there and, after completing the Rinchen Terzod cycle, Trungpa (along with about 100 other monks) joined a seminary program that Khenpo Gangshar was leading, assisted by five kyorpöns.

When Trungpa had to return to Surmang earlier than expected to take on responsibilities in late 1956 (because of the death of a senior lama there), he requested that Gangshar come to Surmang as his tutor and to lead the Surmang seminary program; the Venerable Khenpo consented. According to Trungpa, in the fall of 1957 and in light of the changing times in Tibet, Khenpo Gangshar instituted radical changes to the seminary. He opened the full range of instruction to any and all laypeople – including women – and asked the hermits with lifelong vows of seclusion to return to the monastery to help teach.

It was quite remarkable at the time that a Nyingma professor be asked to serve as the founding dean of a Kagyu shedra (monastic college), but Khenpo Ganshar is most well known for a year of particularly profound and concise teaching following his apparent death.

Two years after arriving at Surmang Monastery, Gangshar Rinpoche became very ill and apparently died (according to both Nyingma and Kagyu tradition, he did in fact die). While his body was resting in samadhi, Trungpa Rinpoche sat vigil. At one moment Trungpa's movement caused a slight breeze, which revived Khenpo Gangshar. For the next year, he exhibited a noticeably different personality (e.g., taking on a consort), rarely if ever slept, and skillfully and uniquely taught every person he encountered the root-essence of Buddhadharma by pointing out the nature of their mind (Dzogchen, Mahamudra). Then one day he announced that he had completed the work that he had returned from the dead to accomplish; returning to his normal personality and routine, he continued as dean of the Surmang shedra until his imprisonment by invading Chinese troops.

It was said at the time that he died in prison between 1958 and 1961, but it has also been reported that he survived 22 years of imprisonment and died in 1980 or 1981.

== Bibliography ==
- Naturally Liberating Whatever You Meet: Instructions to Guide You on the Profound Path. Translated by Erik Pema Kunsang. Kathmandu: Rangjung Yeshe Translations & Publications, 1989.
- Khenchen Thrangu, Vivid Awareness: The Mind Instructions of Khenpo Gangshar. Translated and edited by David Karma Choephel. Boston & London: Shambhala Publications, 2011. ISBN 978-1-59030-816-5 (Includes the preceding text, in a revised translation.)
