= Karmê Chöling =

Buddhist retreat center in Vermont, US

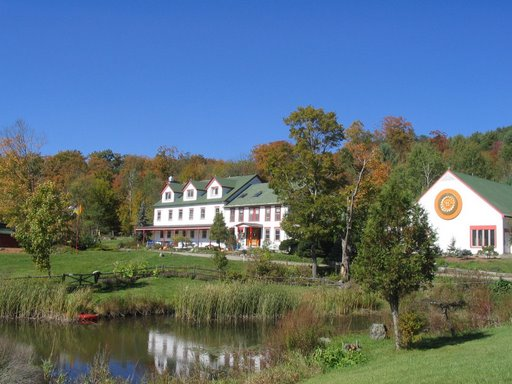
Karme Choling from a parking lot, showing the pond and front of the building

Karmê Chöling is a Shambhala Buddhist meditation retreat center and community in Barnet, Vermont. It was originally known as "Tail of the Tiger". The staff there offers meditation programs and retreats in the Shambhala Buddhist tradition to hundreds of students each year. Karmê Chöling facilities include 717 acres (2.9 km2) of wooded land, seven meditation halls, a Zen archery range, an organic garden, dining facilities, single and double rooms, dormitory housing, and seven retreat cabins. The center also houses visitors and staff in tents on wooden platforms in the warmer months of May through September. The center gives retreats, seminars, and workshops on meditation, gardening, archery, and theater.

== History ==
In 1970, Karmê Chöling was founded in Barnet, Vermont by the Vidyadhara (literally meaning “knowledge holder”, a spiritual leader of Buddhism) Chögyam Trungpa Rinpoche. Karmê Chöling is the first teaching seat in North America of Chögyam Trungpa Rinpoche, a 20th-century Buddhist meditation master that was credited with bringing Buddhism to the western world. Originally a dairy farm, the building was purchased by Chögyam Trungpa Rinpoche’s students and was converted under his supervision into a Shambhala Buddhist retreat center. It was called “Tail of the Tiger”, but in 1974 the name was changed to Karmê Chöling, which remains its name today.

Since its purchase, meditation rooms, sleeping quarters for key staff and members of certain programs have been added.

Karmê Chöling is affiliated with Shambhala International, and Karma Kagyu, Nyingma, and Shambhala Buddhism lineages.
