= Ösel Tendzin =

American Buddhist master and writer (1943–1990)

Ösel Tendzin (Tibetan: འོད་གསལ་བསྟན་འཛིན་, Wylie: ‘od gsal bstan ‘dzin), born Thomas Frederick Rich Jr. (June 28, 1943 – August 25, 1990), was an American Tibetan Buddhist master and the principal student of Chögyam Trungpa. On August 22, 1976, Trungpa empowered Tendzin as his Vajra Regent and first Western lineage holder in the Karma Kagyu and Nyingma schools of Tibetan Buddhism. On August 25, 1990, Tendzin died of HIV/AIDS in San Francisco, California, aged 47. His wife, Lila Rich, and a group of his students continue to live in Ojai, California.

== History ==
=== Early life ===
Tendzin's original full birth name was Thomas Frederick Rich Jr. He was born on June 28, 1943, in Passaic, New Jersey. He graduated in 1965 from Fordham University, initially working as a physical therapist in New York City and Los Angeles. Before joining Trungpa's Vajradhatu community, he studied with Satchidananda Saraswati, who gave him the name Narayana.

=== Vajradhatu ===
In February 1971, Tendzin first met Trungpa in Boulder, Colorado. According to Tendzin, Trungpa revealed his intention to make Tendzin his successor not long after their initial meeting. Starting in 1973, Tendzin held various roles in Vajradhatu's management. He served on the initial board of directors and as an executive vice president. In April 1976, Tendzin's Regency was announced to the community for the first time. Trungpa recounted the moment in his memoir, writing, "to ensure that everything will not stop at my death, it is necessary to have one person as an inheritor, someone whom I can train and observe over a period of many years. For a long time it was in my mind to appoint Narayana to this role, and in the summer of 1976 I did so, empowering him as Dorje Gyaltsap, Vajra Regent."

In his foreword to the Tendzin's 1987 book Buddha in the Palm of Your Hand, Trungpa elaborated on his decision:

As a student and child of mine, Ösel Tendzin has developed his natural ability to respond to the teachings of egolessness. He not only intellectually comprehends these teachings, but he has actually practiced and trained himself in this way. Although I would not say Ösel Tendzin is an enlightened person, he is one of the greatest examples of a practitioner who has followed the command of the Buddha and his guru and the tradition of the Practice Lineage. Many Oriental advisors have said to me, "Do not make an Occidental your successor; they are not trustworthy." With the blessings of His Holiness the 16th Gyalwa Karmapa, and through working with Ösel Tendzin as my Regent, I have come to the conclusion that anybody who possesses tathagatagarbha is worthy of experiencing enlightenment. Moreover, Ösel Tendzin is my prime student. He has been able to commit himself and learn thoroughly the teachings of vajrayana. I have worked arduously in training him as my best student and foremost leader, and His Holiness Karmapa has confirmed his Regency. With His Holiness' blessing, Ösel Tendzin should hold his title and the sanity of the enlightened lineage. He is absolutely capable of imparting the message of buddhadharma to the rest of the world.

Tendzin assumed leadership of the organization in 1987 after Trungpa's death.

=== Satdharma ===
In 1989, Tendzin moved to Ojai, California, with some of his students. After his death, those students led by Patrick Sweeney—whom Tendzin had chosen as his lineage holder and successor—created an organization called Satdharma. It was formally incorporated in 1992 to continue Tendzin's lineage, separate from Vajradhatu.

== Controversy ==
Among Tendzin's controversial actions was his rejection of the recommendation of senior Kagyu lineage holder the Tai Situpa to take over leadership of Vajradhatu in conjunction with Chögyam Trungpa's half-brother, Damchu Tenphel, who resided in Tibet. This was "regarded by members as a serious slight to lineage authorities and was construed as the Regent's attempt to secure his position of control." Tendzin "took further action to buttress his centrality by denying students permission to seek teachings from other Kagyu Tibetan teachers, claiming that only he possessed the special transmission, materials and knowledge unique to the Trungpa lineage. Students were told that if they wanted to practice within the community, they would have to take spiritual instruction from the Regent."

Other behavior was troubling as well. As one scholar who has studied the community noted, Tendzin was "bisexual and known to be very promiscuous" and "enjoyed seducing straight men" but the community "did not find [this behavior] particularly troublesome." One scholar noted "it became a mark of prestige for a man, gay or straight, to have sex with the Regent, just as it had been for a woman to have sex with [Trungpa] Rinpoche", but at least one student reported that Tendzin had raped him. As a former Vajradhatu member attested, "a chilling story had recently been reported by one of ... [the] teachers at the Buddhist private school [for the Vajradhatu community]. This straight, married male was pinned face-down across Rich's desk by the guards [the Dorje Kasung] while Rich forcibly raped him."

It was revealed in 1989 that Tendzin had contracted HIV and for nearly three years knew it, yet continued to have unprotected sex with his students without informing them. He transmitted it to a student who later died of AIDS. Others close to Tendzin, including Vajradhatu's board of directors, knew for two years that Tendzin was HIV-positive and sexually active but kept silent. As one student reported at the time:

I was very distressed that he and his entourage had lied to us for so long, always saying he did not have AIDS. I was even more distressed over the stories of how the Regent used his position as a dharma teacher to induce "straight" students to have unprotected sex with him, while he claimed he had been tested for AIDS but the result was negative.

Stephen Butterfield, a former student, recounted in a memoir:

Tenzin offered to explain his behavior at a meeting which I attended. Like all of his talks, this was considered a teaching of dharma, and donations were solicited and expected. So I paid him $35.00 to hear his explanation. In response to close questioning by students, he first swore us to secrecy (family secrets again), and then said that Trungpa had requested him to be tested for HIV in the early 1980s and told him to keep quiet about the positive result. Tendzin had asked Trungpa what he should do if students wanted to have sex with him, and Trungpa's reply was that as long as he did his Vajrayana purification practices, it did not matter, because they would not get the disease. Tendzin's answer, in short, was that he had obeyed the guru.

Butterfield noted:

Tendzin's account of his conversations with Trungpa was challenged by other senior disciples, who claimed Trungpa would never have led anyone to believe that the laws of nature could be suspended by practice. Butterfield also wrote, "it was a difficult dilemma: if you chose to believe Tendzin, then Trungpa had simply been wrong in telling him he could not transmit the disease . . but what then became of the axiom that the guru cannot make a mistake? But if you chose to disbelieve Tendzin, then Trungpa may have been wrong in allowing him to remain Regent, or perhaps in choosing him at all... I heard Tendzin's illness explained by his servants in this way: it was not a consequence of any folly or self-indulgence on his part, but the karma of his infected partners, that he had deliberately imbibed for them. In what way they benefitted was never made clear to me, although one could safely assume the benefits did not include physical cure."

According to Diana Mukpo, Trungpa's wife and widow, he ultimately became disillusioned with Tendzin as his heir, and during his final illness called Tendzin "terrible" and "dreadful" and said he would have gotten rid of him had he had a suitable alternate candidate. Rick Fields, the editor of Vajradhatu's publication the Vajradhatu Sun, wrote that he resigned from his editorial position after Tendzin and the board of directors stopped him from publishing news of the events.

== Bibliography ==
- Buddha in the Palm of Your Hand, Shambhala Publications. Boston, 1982. 0-87773-223-X
- Space, Time and Energy, Vajra Regent Ösel Tendzin, Satdharma Publications, 2000.
- Like Water Poured into Water, Vajra Regent Ösel Tendzin, Foreword by Lady Lila Rich; Introduction by Patrick Sweeney, Satdharma Publications, 2006.
