= Basic goodness =

Basic goodness is a term coined by Tibetan spiritual teacher Chögyam Trungpa Rinpoche and is a core concept in his terma. It is used both to discuss the experience of reality and also basic human nature, which arises as fundamental virtue. Everything that arises is, at the ground level from beginningless time, good.

In his 1980 Seminary, he associates this term with both absolute bodhicitta and specifically the Tibetan term künshi ngangluk kyi gewa (Wylie: kun gzhi ngang lugs kyi dge ba), which comes from the Kadam tradition and refers to the natural virtues of the künshi (Tibetan; Sanskrit: ālāya).

== Three virtues ==
This ethical scheme presents three virtues:

- Unborn, meaning non-manufactured
- Nondwelling, meaning that it cannot be pinned down
- Free from pigeonholing, meaning that it is beyond conceptual reference points

In his 1981 Seminary, he described the term as also referring to personal wholesomeness and dedication to others.

== Explanations ==
Melvin McLeod explains the term "basic" as indicating the primordial, self-existing nature and "goodness" as a faultless aspect. John Miller associated the term with Buddha-nature.

Trungpa Rinpoche's son, Sakyong Mipham Rinpoche, expressed the relationship between basic goodness and enlightened society in these words:

"In essence, the emphasis of the Buddhist path is to help us attain enlightenment, and the emphasis of the Shambhala path is to help us create and maintain a good society. When we put these two together, we have the Shambhalian Buddhist view of enlightened society. Thus the two paths work in tandem, not in competition."
