= Shambhala International =

Buddhist organisation

- Predecessor: Vajradhatu
- Formation: February 2000
- Founder: Sakyong Mipham Rinpoche
- Website: shambhala.org

Shambhala International (originally named Vajradhatu) is the umbrella organization that encompasses many of the distinct institutions of the Shambhala spiritual community, founded by the students of the Tibetan Buddhist teacher Chögyam Trungpa Rinpoche.

Based in Halifax, Nova Scotia, Shambhala International links a worldwide network of urban Buddhist meditation centers and retreat centers, as well as a Western Buddhist monastery and other institutions.

== Scope and function ==
Shambhala International functions to support the activities of the Shambhala spiritual community. It is led by an independent Board of Directors, who manage a central administrative team called Shambhala Global Services that offers infrastructure and support to the community globally.

== Associated centers ==
Shambhala International supports more than 150 Shambhala Centres and Groups, which are meditation communities of varying sizes in cities and towns across North and South America, Europe, and Oceania.

It also supports several retreat centers and other organizations. Below is a partial list of notable organizations affiliated with or managed within Shambhala International:

- Dechen Chöling (retreat center in Limoges, France)
- Gampo Abbey (monastery in Nova Scotia)
- Karmê Chöling (retreat center in Barnet, Vermont, United States)

=== Karmê Chöling ===
In 1970, Karmê Chöling was founded in Barnet, Vermont by the Vidyadhara, (literally meaning “awareness holder;” a spiritual leader of Buddhism) Chögyam Trungpa Rinpoche. Karmê Chöling is the first teaching seat in North America of Chögyam Trungpa Rinpoche, a 20th-century Buddhist meditation master that was credited with bringing Buddhism to the western world. Originally a dairy farm, the building was purchased by Chögyam Trungpa Rinpoche’s students and was converted under his supervision into a Shambhala Buddhist retreat center. It was called “Tail of the Tiger”, but in 1974 the name was changed to Karmê Chöling, which remains its name today.

=== Rocky Mountain Dharma Center ===
The Rocky Mountain Dharma Center was founded by Chögyam Trungpa Rinpoche in 1971 at Red Feather Lakes, Colorado. It was located on 600 acres in a valley in the northern Colorado Rockies.

After the death of Ösel Tendzin in 1990, Trungpa's son, Ösel Rangdröl Mukpo became head of the organization. In 1995, Ösel Rangdröl Mukpo was enthroned as Sakyong Mipham Rinpoche, a chögyal, or "dharma king," who holds and propagates the teachings of Shambhala. The name of Rocky Mountain Dharma center was changed to Rocky Mountain Shambhala Center sometime in the 1990s.

In 2000, after Sakyong Mipham started the process of enclosing the previously secular teachings of Shambhala within the container of a new Buddhist lineage, Shambhala Buddhism, the retreat center was incorporated separately from Shambhala International as a 501c3 educational non-profit named Shambhala Mountain Center. The new center was independent of Shambhala International with limited oversight from the Sakyong Potrang, an organization representing Sakyong Mipham.

In September 2020, an investigative report detailed several incidents of sexual harm that had taken place at Rocky Mountain Dharma Center.

== History and leadership ==
=== Foundation by Chögyam Trungpa Rinpoche ===
In 1970, Chögyam Trungpa Rinpoche arrived in North America. The first established center of his teachings was "Tail of the Tiger" in Barnet, Vermont (now Karmê Chöling). A second branch of the community began to form when Rinpoche began teaching at the University of Colorado. The Rocky Mountain Dharma Center was established, now known as Drala Mountain Center, near Red Feather Lakes, Colorado.

In the early 1970s, the community grew rapidly and attracted the involvement of notable figures such as Allen Ginsberg and Anne Waldman. In 1972 Trungpa had identified Thomas F. Rich, an American with Buddhist name Ösel Tendzin, as his dharma heir.

In 1973, the community was incorporated in Colorado as Vajradhatu. Vajradhatu hosted visits by the Sixteenth Karmapa (head of the Karma Kagyu lineage of Tibetan Buddhism) in 1974, Dilgo Khyentse Rinpoche (head of the Nyingma lineage of Tibetan Buddhism) in 1976, and the Fourteenth Dalai Lama in 1981.

In 1974, Naropa Institute was founded, a contemplative studies and liberal arts college, now fully accredited as Naropa University.

In a formal ceremony on August 22, 1976, Trungpa appointed Rich as Dorje Gyaltsap, Vajra Regent and Director of the First Class of Vajradhatu. As described in the 1977 article in "Garuda V", which also reproduces the proclamation (signed by Trungpa XI and the 16th Karmapa, Trungpa empowered Thomas Rich "as his regent and as a holder of the Kagyu and Nyingma lineages". Trungpa further stated "There is the possibility that members of the sangha, Western people, can take over from the Tibetans".

Beginning in 1976, Chögyam Trungpa Rinpoche presented a series of teachings known as the Shambhala teachings to the community. These teachings presented the principle of basic goodness, and a secular rather than religious approach to enlightenment. They were encoded into a Shambhala Training series offered widely throughout the community. In 1979, Trungpa Rinpoche empowered his eldest son, Ösel Rangdröl Mukpo, as his successor and heir to the Shambhala lineage.

In 1986, Trungpa moved the international headquarters of Vajradhatu to Halifax, Nova Scotia. A large number of his students emigrated from the United States to Nova Scotia along with him.

=== Leadership by Ösel Tendzin ===
In 1987, one year after moving the organization to Nova Scotia, Trungpa Rinpoche died of illnesses related to long-term alcohol abuse. He was 47. Following Trungpa's death, senior Kagyu lineage holder Tai Situpa recommended that he himself take over leadership of Vajradhatu in conjunction with Trungpa's half brother, Damchu Tenphel, who resided in Tibet. Tendzin, Trungpa's appointed successor, declined the offer and assumed leadership of the organization.

A senior American student named Thomas Rich, whom Trungpa Rinpoche had given the title Vajra Regent Ösel Tendzin, assumed leadership of the organization. Tendzin acted as spiritual head of Vajradhatu until around 1989. In December 1988, the community learned Tendzin had passed HIV to a male partner in the Colorado congregation, who in turn unknowingly infected his female partner. Tendzin, who was HIV-positive, knowingly had sex with students for three years without disclosing his infection, believing that his spiritual practice protected himself and others from AIDS. It eventually came out that the Vajradhatu board of directors had known of the problem for more than two years and had done nothing about it.

Tendzin died in 1990 from HIV/AIDS, and Ösel Rangdröl Mukpo, now known as Sakyong Mipham Rinpoche, assumed spiritual and executive leadership of Vajradhatu.

=== Leadership by Sakyong Mipham Rinpoche ===
The community had been deeply divided and in distress over the events surrounding Ösel Tendzin's death, and repeatedly turned to the elder statesmen of the Kagyu and Nyingma lineages for guidance. The succession of Ösel Rangdröl was approved by the heads of both the Kagyu and Nyingma lineages, who encouraged the community to persevere. Jamgön Kongtrül the third, one of the four regents of the Karma Kagyu lineage in the period when the Karmapa had yet to be recognized, issued a statement that "His Holiness [Dilgo Khenstse Rinpoche, head of the Nyingma lineage and the Sawang's teacher] and the Kagyu lineage holders are all in agreement that the Sawang Ösel Rangdröl Mukpo should become the lineage holder of Vajradhatu."

In February 2000, restated articles of incorporation were signed, officially changing the name from Vajradhatu to Shambhala International. The change of name, which began informally with the Sakyong Mipham's assumption of leadership in 1990, reflected his approach of integrating the Shambhala teachings within Buddhism and making them the unifying principle of a Shambhala Buddhist sangha. Also beginning in 2000, Sakyong Mipham Rinpoche moved to enclose the previously secular teachings of Shambhala within the container of a new Buddhist lineage, known as Shambhala Buddhism.

In early 2018, allegations surfaced of sexual misconduct and misuse of power by Sakyong Mipham Rinpoche toward his students. Following a series of reports by an initiative called Buddhist Project Sunshine on sexual misconduct within Shambhala International, the sitting board, known as the Kalapa Council, resigned. Sakyong Mipham Rinpoche stepped back from his teaching and governance roles, and has not acted in a spiritual or executive leadership role within Shambhala International since that time. Shambhala International hired a law firm to investigate the allegations, and in February 2019 the investigator issued a report of its findings, which included finding a pattern of sexual misconduct and at least one credible incident of sexual assault by Sakyong Mipham.

=== Leadership by Shambhala Board ===
In late 2018, a Shambhala Board of community members assumed executive leadership of the organization. According to the organization, it has implemented some of the third-party recommendations for addressing community harm, including instituting a new Shambhala code of conduct.

In February 2022, the Shambhala Board reached a mediated agreement with Sakyong Mipham Rinpoche that he would no longer hold administrative responsibilities in Shambhala International, and the organization's bylaws were amended to establish the Shambhala Board as an independent leadership body.

== See also ==
- List of Buddhist temples
