= Shambhala Training =

Secular meditation techniques

Shambhala Training is a secular approach to meditation and a new religious movement developed by Tibetan Buddhist teacher Chögyam Trungpa Rinpoche and his students. It is based on what Trungpa calls Shambhala Vision, which sees enlightened society as not purely mythical, but as realizable by people of all faiths through practices of mindfulness/awareness, non-aggression, and sacred outlook.

== History ==
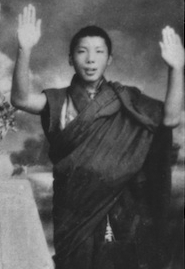
Chögyam Trungpa Rinpoche

Chögyam Trungpa Rinpoche arrived in North America in 1970, and began teaching Western students from within the Kagyu and Nyingma lineages of Tibetan Buddhism. These students formed a growing spiritual community, which incorporated as Vajradhatu (now Shambhala International) in 1973.

Beginning in 1976, Trungpa Rinpoche presented a series of teachings known as the "Shambhala teachings" to the community. These teachings presented the principle of basic goodness, and a secular rather than religious approach to enlightenment.

In 1977, Trungpa Rinpoche first trained senior students to teach Shambhala Training, a series of weekend meditation programs offered widely throughout the community, and in 1978, Trungpa Rinpoche conducted the first annual Kalapa Assembly, an intensive training program for advanced Shambhala teachings and practices.

In 1984, Trungpa Rinpoche published the book Shambhala: The Sacred Path of the Warrior, which gives a detailed presentation of the core Shambhala teachings.

In 1987, Trungpa died of illnesses related to his long-term alcohol abuse. He was 47 years old. After Trungpa's death, Vajra Regent Ösel Tendzin became spiritual head of Vajradhatu until around 1989. Tendzin died in 1990 at the age of 48 from AIDS-related complications. Both Trungpa and Tendzin had sexual relationships with many of their students, with Tendzin passing along the HIV virus to at least one student who later died of the disease. This history led to a period of instability and conflict within the organization, until Trungpa Rinpoche's eldest son, Ösel Rangdröl Mukpo, became spiritual and executive head of the Vajradhatu community.

In 1995, Ösel Rangdröl Mukpo was endorsed by Penor Rinpoche, head of the Nyingma lineage, as the reincarnation of Ju Mipham, and enthroned as Sakyong Mipham Rinpoche.

Beginning in 2000, Sakyong Mipham Rinpoche moved to enclose the previously secular teachings of Shambhala within the container of a new lineage known as Shambhala Buddhism. In the following years, the Shambhala and Buddhist curricula were merged, and Shambhala versions of practices such as Ngöndro were developed.

In 2018, Sakyong Mipham was accused of multiple counts of sexual misconduct and abuse of power and temporarily stepped back from teaching. Further investigation found enough of the accusations to be credible and established a pattern of abuse of power. In September 2020, an investigative report detailed a culture of abuse dating back to early days of the Shambhala organization. In February 2022, the Shambhala organization reorganized itself to be self-governing and financially independent of Sakyong Mipham Rinpoche, and continued to offer the Shambhala Training path under its new structure.

== Teachings ==
In Shambhala: The Sacred Path of the Warrior, Chögyam Trungpa Rinpoche wrote:

I am honoured and grateful that in the past I have been able to present the wisdom and dignity of human life within the context of the religious teachings of Buddhism. Now it gives me tremendous joy to present the principles of Shambhala warriorship and to show how we can conduct our lives as warriors with fearlessness and rejoicing, without destroying one another... I have been presenting a series of "Shambhala teachings" that use the image of the Shambhala kingdom to represent the ideal of secular enlightenment, that is, the possibility of uplifting our personal existence and that of others without the help of any religious outlook. For although the Shambhala tradition is founded on the sanity and gentleness of the Buddhist tradition, at the same time it has its own independent basis, which is directly cultivating who and what we are as human beings.

The teachings cover art, society, and politics and the goal of creating an enlightened society. This is thought of not only as a social and political process but a practice requiring individuals to develop an awareness of the basic goodness and inherent dignity of themselves, of others, and of the everyday details of the world around them. This is facilitated by cultivating gentleness and bravery.

=== Overview ===
Some key concepts presented in Shambhala Training include:

- Basic goodness: Our essential nature is good, workable, and worthwhile. This is sometimes contrasted with the idea of original sin, although it is arguable that both notions include the concept of a primordial purity that is stained or covered over.
- Enlightened society: A vision of a culture that expresses basic goodness in its cultural forms, relationships, and traditions.
- Cocoon: Conceptualization can become armor that cuts us off from the vividness of the world around us. We are advised to discard that armor.
- Warriorship: Personal bravery, dignity, decency, and gentleness in working with one's mind and life.
- Windhorse (Tib. lungta): Akin to Qi or life force, practitioners cultivate windhorse through a variety of practices and disciplines.
- Drala: Akin to kami or spirit conventionally. This term refers to the use of direct sense perceptions to overcome conceptual mental fixation.
- The Four Dignities: Meek Tiger, Perky Lion, Outrageous Garuda, and Inscrutable Dragon.
- Heaven, Earth, and Humanity: The role of humanity is to connect the ground of the situation (earth) with the vision of possibility (heaven), so to rule oneself or society is to join heaven, earth, and humanity.
- Natural hierarchy: Akin to an arranged mandala where people are connected, interdependent, and communicate in natural ways.

=== Meditation technique ===
The basic meditation technique initially presented in Shambhala Training includes sitting with legs loosely crossed, taking good posture, leaving the eyes slightly open, and focusing attention on the out-breath. A feeling of dissolving accompanies the out-breath but no specific attention is prescribed during the in-breath. The hands are placed face down on the thighs. Thoughts may be labeled neutrally as "thinking" before attention is returned to the out breath. Variations on the technique are taught during the first five "Heart of Warriorship" weekends. Meditation is described in Shambala as "a natural state of the human mind—at rest, open, alert."

=== Curriculum ===
Though Shambhala Training is a personal, ongoing practice of meditation and engaged activities, the Shambhala Training curriculum is presented in a series of progressive weekend programs, and then longer retreats. "The Heart of Warriorship" curriculum consist of five weekend programs with each weekend followed by a corresponding 'Everyday Life' class. The latter seven weekends are called "The Sacred Path," as follows:

==== The Heart of Warriorship ====
- Level I: The Art of Being Human
- Meditation in Everyday Life
- Level II: Birth of the Warrior
- Contentment in Everyday Life
- Level III: Warrior in the World
- Joy in Everyday Life
- Level IV: Awakened Heart
- Fearlessness in Everyday Life
- Level V: Open Sky
- Wisdom in Everyday Life

==== The Sacred Path ====
- Great Eastern Sun
- Windhorse
- Drala
- Meek
- Perky
- Outrageous and Inscrutable
- Golden Key

==== Warrior Assembly ====
The Warrior Assembly is a residential program of less than two weeks' duration. These weekends are intended to be completed in order. Windhorse and Drala are sometimes exchanged in the sequence. Students may then continue onto an intensive nine- to fourteen-day-long residential retreat called Warriors Assembly. Practices and root texts are made available as students complete the prerequisite study and practice stages. However, it is claimed by Shambhala adherents that much of their content is found in the book Shambhala: The Sacred Path of the Warrior and others.

During the Sacred Path weekends and Warriors Assembly, students study Shambhala texts composed by Chögyam Trungpa, as well as practices such as that of the stroke of ashé. The stroke of ashé was first produced on the night of October 25, 1976, while Trungpa was leading a three-month seminary in Land O' Lakes, Wisconsin. It was followed by subsequent texts, some of which were considered to be terma, which were received over the next few years.

== Distinguishing characteristics ==
Shambhala partly derives from Chögyam Trungpa's Shambhala teachings, named after the mythical Tibetan Kingdom of Shambhala. Shambhala in its current form is a new religious movement, the advanced levels of which involve secret teachings and a vow of devotion to the guru, a position currently held by Sakyong Mipham Rinpoche.

=== Shambhala and Shambhala Training ===
The Great Eastern Sun

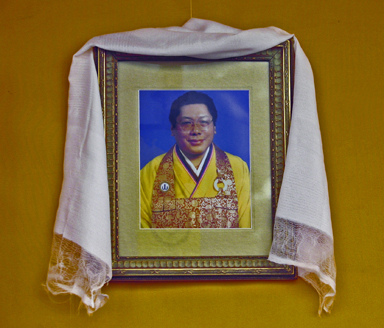
Chogyam Trungpa Rinpoche

The concept of Shambhala is part of the lore of Tibetan Buddhism, and is described in the Kalachakra tantra. The Kalachakra tantra was presumably introduced to Tibet still in the 11th century, the epoch of the Tibetan Kalachakra calendar. In the Kalachakra narrative, King Manjuśrīkīrti is said to have been born in 159 BC and ruled over a kingdom of 300,510 followers of the Mlechha religion, some of whom worshiped the Sun. He is said to have expelled 20,000 people from his domain who clung to Surya Samadhi (solar worship) rather than convert to Kalachakra (Wheel of Time) Buddhism. After realizing these were the wisest and best of his people and how much he was in need of them, he later asked them to return and some did. Those who did not return are said to have set up the city of Shambhala. Manjuśrīkīrti initiated the preaching of the Kalachakra teachings in order to try to convert those who returned and were still under his rule.

The Kalachakra tantra prophesies that when the world declines into war and greed, and all is lost, the 25th Kalki king Maitreya will emerge from Shambhala, with a huge army to vanquish Dark Forces and usher in a worldwide Golden Age. This final battle is prophesied for the year 2424 or 2425 (in the 3304th year after the death of Buddha).

Shambhala Training is administered worldwide by Shambhala International. Shambhala Training is presented in a series of paid weekend programs, the first five of which are called "The Heart of Warriorship", and the subsequent seven "The Sacred Path". The Warrior Assembly is the final program in the Shambhala Training Sacred Path, after which students must take vows of devotion to the guru if they wish to continue. During Warrior Assembly, students study the Shambhala terma text, The Golden Sun of the Great East, and receive the practices of the "stroke of ashé" (said to be a terma through Trungpa) and lungta.

The Satdharma community, established by Trungpa's appointed regent and Dharma heir Ösel Tendzin (Thomas Rich), offers a comparable "Shambhala Education" course of training in Ojai, California.

=== Shambhala within Shambhala Teaching ===
After the year 2000, with the merging of the secular teachings of Shambhala and the teachings of Vajradhatu into Shambhala Teaching, completion of Shambhala Seminary (which requires taking Buddhist refuge and bodhisattva vows, as well as Buddhist samaya vows of devotion to the guru) became a condition for progressing on the path and receiving the most advanced Shambhala teachings, such as those of Werma and the Scorpion Seal Retreat. In turn, Warrior Assembly became a prerequisite for attending the Seminary.

The Rigden Abhisheka enters the student into the practice of the Werma Sadhana. It is open to graduates of Shambhala Vajrayana Seminary who have completed their Shambhala ngöndro and to students who have already received the Werma Sadhana and completed their Kagyü Ngöndro.

=== Shambhala Terma ===
Certain Shambhala practices derive from specific terma texts of Trungpa Rinpoche's such as Letter of the Black Ashe, Letter of the Golden Key that Fulfills Desire, Golden Sun of the Great East, and the Scorpion Seal of the Golden Sun, in long and short versions. Trungpa Rinpoche is believed by his students to have received these teachings directly from Gesar of Ling, an emanation of Padmasambhava, and the Rigden kings. Their terma status was endorsed by the Nyingma teacher Dilgo Khyentse Rinpoche.

The Shambhala dharma practices derived entirely or in part from these texts include those of werma, drala, Wind Horse (Tib. lungta), and meditations on four "dignities of Shambhala": tiger (Tib. tak), lion (Tib. seng), garuda (Tib. kyung) and dragon (Tib. druk). Jamgon Ju Mipham Gyatso, a 19th-century Nyingma lama after whom Sakyong Mipham Rinpoche took his name, wrote about many of these practices and concepts as well. Some, such as the "stroke of Ashé", have no known precedents.

=== Zen influence ===
Trungpa Rinpoche was deeply influenced by his friend Shunryu Suzuki Roshi, a Japanese Zen master who was central to the introduction of Zen Buddhism to America. As a result of this influence, certain attributes of form in Shambhala are derived from Zen, rather than Tibetan Buddhism. The shrine rooms in Shambhala, reflecting the Zen aesthetic of Kanso (簡素) or simplicity, tend to be sparsely furnished and decorated, whereas traditional Tibetan Buddhist shrine rooms are elaborate, ornate, and colorful. As in Zen but unlike Tibetan Buddhist practice, meditators engage in group practice of shamatha-vipashyana.

In addition, Shambhala have adopted the practices of kyūdō, ikebana (kado), tea ceremony, oryoki, calligraphy, and other traditional Japanese arts.

=== Elements of Bön, Taoism, and Confucianism ===
To a lesser extent, Trungpa Rinpoche incorporated other elements into Shambhala tradition. From the Bön religion, the lhasang ceremony is performed; other elements of shamanism play a role. From Confucianism comes a framework of heaven, earth, and man for understanding the proper relationship between different elements of compositions of all kinds. From Taoism comes the use of feng shui and other incorporations.

=== Dorje Kasung ===
The Dorje Kasung is a paramilitary group that was formed by Chögyam Trungpa Rinpoche to provide security services, provide driving and personal assistance to the teachers, and address any issues of conflict or health that arise in the community. The training and model of the Dorje Kasung are based on military forms, such as hierarchy, uniforms, and drills. After the reports of misconduct became public, sixteen senior-level Kasung released a statement with their own reports of witnessing abuse while in their roles.

The organization's stated purpose for utilizing the military format is not to propagate war, but "to take advantage of the discipline and energy of military forms to embody and communicate compassion."

=== Maitri and Mudra ===
Maitri is a therapeutic program that works with different styles of neurosis using principles of the Five Buddha Families. Mudra practice, first explored by the Mudra Theater Group, is based on traditional Tibetan monastic dance training and the teachings on mahamudra.

=== Traditional Buddhist practices ===
Shambhala Teaching also appropriates various meditation techniques of traditional Tibetan Buddhist lineages, including shamatha/vipashyana, zazen, madhyamaka, mahamudra and Dzogchen, tonglen, Lojong, traditional yidam practices such as Vajrayogini, Chakrasamvara, Vajrakilaya, Jambhala, Gesar, Tara, Manjushri, and Vajrasattva.

== Root Texts ==
Chögyam Trungpa wrote a number of Shambhala texts throughout his life, and also received a number of them as terma. Long-time students and members of his Nalanda Translation Committee elaborated on his reception of terma in a 2006 newsletter:

At the first Kalapa Assembly in the fall of 1978, during one of our translation sessions with the Vidyadhara, Larry Mermelstein engaged him in an interesting discussion about the nature of the Shambhala texts he was presenting to us. When asked whether they were terma (“treasure teachings” hidden long ago to be discovered at an appropriate time in the future), he replied, “Yes, sort of.” When we asked whether we should include the terma mark to indicate terma in our translations, his response was, “Not yet; maybe later.” In fact, this did not come to pass until after his death, when Dilgo Khyentse Rinpoche instructed us to include this in our future publications of these texts, and he confirmed with no hesitation that they were indeed authentic terma. When we asked the Vidyadhara whether these texts originated with Padmakara, the source of the vast majority of treasure teachings, at that time we didn’t know that other teachers also hid dharma as termas. So when Rinpoche replied that these texts were more likely from Gesar, we were understandably puzzled. But after a long pause Rinpoche added, “And of course Gesar was an emanation of Padmakara, so that should take care of things for you!” When we asked about what meaning Gesar had in terms of the Shambhala teachings, Rinpoche exclaimed: “Gesar is the vanguard of Shambhala.” (...in other contexts, the Vidyadhara indicated that the Shambhala terma had originated with the Rigden kings, Shiwa Ökar, or Gesar of Ling.)

=== Selected writings ===
==== Written or received in Tibet ====
- The Epic of Lha
  Written and lost as Trungpa fled the Communist invasion of Tibet in 1959, the first two chapters were subsequently reconstructed in the west. It was "a spiritual account of the history of Shambhala."
- The Ocean of the Play of Buddha Activity: A Daily Supplication to the Warrior Gesar, the Great Being Döndrup, King of Werma, Tamer of Enemies
  Written in July or August 1958 at Yak Monastery in eastern Tibet, at the request of Namkha Drimed Rinpoche.

==== Written or received in the west ====
- Golden Sun of the Great East
  Received as terma on October 27 or 28, 1976. The Auto-Commentary to the text was dictated over the following few days.
- Letter of the Black Ashe
  Received as terma on January 15, 1978.
- Letter of the Golden Key that Fulfills Desire
  Received as terma on October 5, 1978.
- The Rigden Abhiṣheka
  Composed on February 9, 1979.
- Scorpion Seal of the Golden Sun
  Received during the 1980 Seminary in Europe. A long and a short version exist.
- The Roar of the Werma: The Sādhana of the Warrior
  Adapted by Chögyam Trungpa from the Scorpion Seal of the Golden Sun in May 1980 in Patzcuaro, Mexico.

=== Published lectures and commentaries ===
- Shambhala: Sacred Path of the Warrior
  Published in 1984, based on lectures and written material by Chögyam Trungpa, reviewed and edited by a number of students and other individuals, including Ken Wilber, and finalized by Carolyn Rose Gimian.
- Great Eastern Sun: The Wisdom of Shambhala
  Published posthumously in 1999, based primarily on lectures Trungpa delivered as part of the Level 5 of the Heart of Warriorship Shambhala Training program, and edited by Carolyn Rose Gimian.

== Antecedents ==
=== Windhorse ===
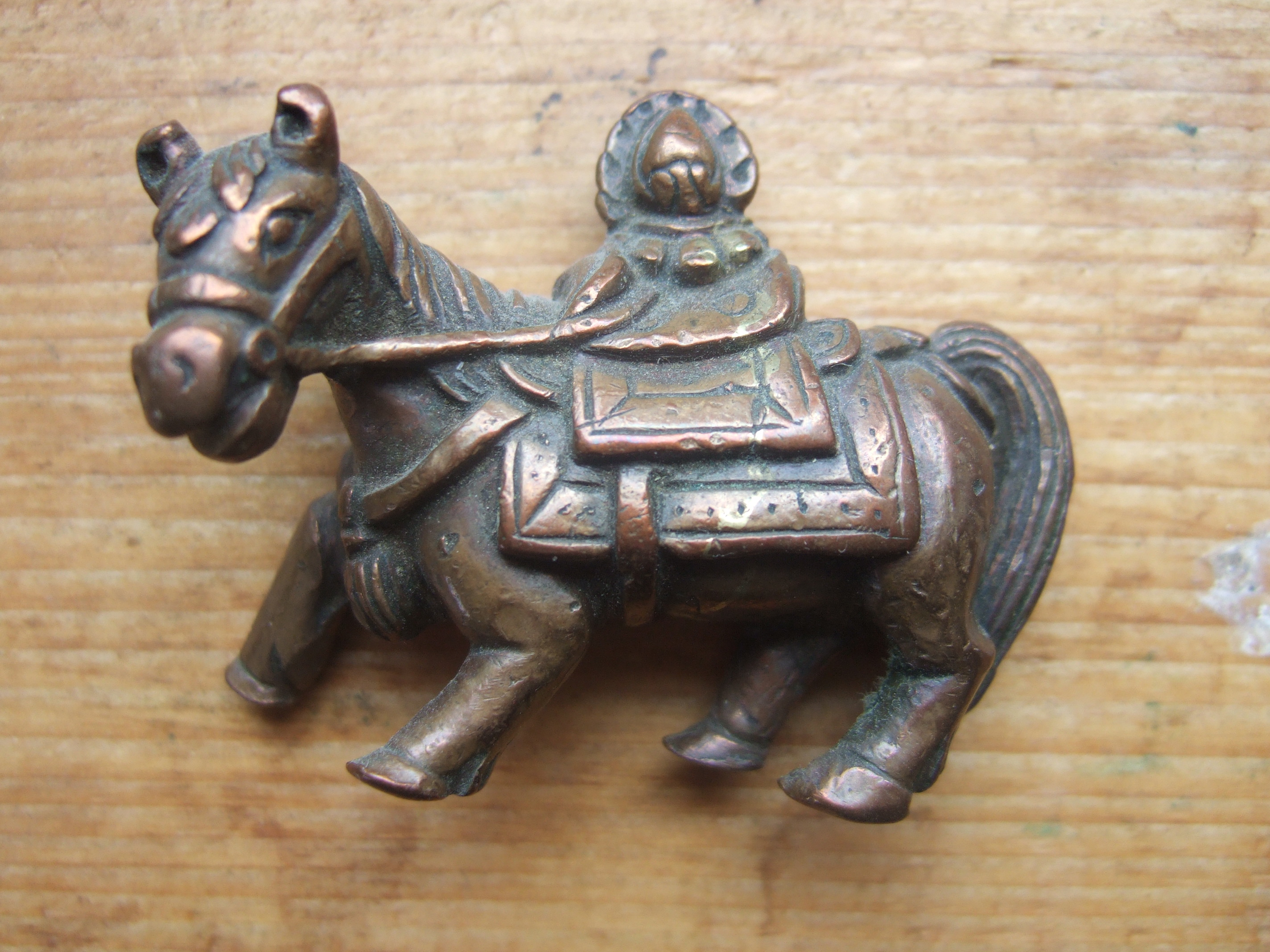
Tibetan bronze statue of a windhorse, probably 19th century

In Tibet, a distinction was made between Buddhism (Lha-cho, wylie: lha chos, literally "religion of the gods") and folk religion (Mi-cho, wylie: mi chos, literally "religion of humans"). Windhorse (wylie: rlung ta) was predominately a feature of the folk culture, a "mundane notion of the layman rather than a Buddhist religious ideal," as Tibetan scholar Samten G. Karmay explains. However, while "the original concept of rlung ta bears no relation to Buddhism," over the centuries it became more common for Buddhist elements to be incorporated. Windhorse has several meanings in the Tibetan context.

As Karmay notes, "the word [windhorse] is still and often mistakenly taken to mean only the actual flag planted on the roof of a house or on a high place near a village. In fact, it is a symbol of the idea of well-being or good fortune. This idea is clear in such expressions as rlung rta dar ba, the 'increase of the windhorse,' when things go well with someone; rlung rta rgud pa, the 'decline of windhorse,' when the opposite happens. The colloquial equivalent for this is lam ’gro, which also means luck."

In his 1998 study The Arrow and the Spindle, Karmay traces several antecedents for the windhorse tradition in Tibet. First, he notes that there has long been confusion over the spelling because the sound produced by the word can be spelt either klung rta (river horse) or rlung rta (wind horse)--the first letter is silent in both cases. In the early twentieth century the great scholar Ju Mipham felt compelled to clarify that in his view rlung rta was preferable to klung rta, indicating that some degree of ambiguity must have persisted at least up to his time. Karmay suggests that "river horse" (klung rta) was actually the original concept, as found in the Tibetan nag rtsis system of astrology imported from China. The nag rtsis system has four basic elements: srog (vital force), lu (wylie: lus, body), wangtang (wylie: dbang thang, "field of power"), and lungta (wylie: klung rta, river horse). Karmey suggests that klung rta in turn derives from the Chinese idea of the lung ma, "dragon horse," because in Chinese mythology dragons often arise out of rivers (although druk is the Tibetan for dragon, in some cases they would render the Chinese lung phonetically). Thus, in his proposed etymology the Chinese lung ma became klung rta which in turn became rlung rta. Samtay further reasons that the drift in understanding from "river horse" to "wind horse" would have been reinforced by associations in Tibet of the "ideal horse" (rta chogs) with swiftness and wind.

=== The Four Dignities, Drala and the Lhasang ritual ===
On prayer flags and paper prints, windhorses usually appear in the company of the four animals of the cardinal directions, which are "an integral part of the rlung ta composition": garuda or kyung, and dragon in the upper corners, and tiger and snow lion in the lower corners. In this context, the wind horse is typically shown without wings, but carries the Three Jewels, or the wish fulfilling jewel. Its appearance is supposed to bring peace, wealth, and harmony. The ritual invocation of the wind horse usually happens in the morning and during the growing moon. The flags themselves are commonly known as windhorse. They flutter in the wind, and carry the prayers to heaven like the horse flying in the wind.

The garuda and the dragon have their origin in Indian and Chinese mythology, respectively. However, regarding the origin of the animals as a tetrad, "neither written nor oral explanations exist anywhere" with the exception of a thirteenth-century manuscript called "The Appearance of the Little Black-Headed Man" (dBu nag mi'u dra chag), and in that case a yak is substituted for the snow lion, which had not yet emerged as the national symbol of Tibet. In the text, a nyen (wylie: gNyan, mountain spirit) kills his son-in-law, Khri-to, who is the primeval human man, in a misguided attempt to avenge his daughter. The nyen then is made to see his mistake by a mediator and compensates Khri-to's six sons with the gift of the tiger, yak, garuda, dragon, goat, and dog. The first four brothers then launch an exhibition to kill robbers who were also involved with their mother's death, and each of their four animals then becomes a personal drala (wylie: dgra bla, "protective warrior spirit") to one of the four brothers. The brothers who received the goat and dog choose not to participate, and their animals therefore do not become drala. Each of the brothers represents one of the six primitive Tibetan clans (bod mi'u gdung drug), with which their respective animals also become associated.

The four animals (with the snow lion replacing the yak) also recur frequently in the Gesar epic, and sometimes Gesar and his horse are depicted with the dignities in place of the windhorse. In this context the snow lion, garuda and dragon represent the Ling (wylie: Gling) community from which Gesar comes, while the tiger represents the family of the Tagrong (wylie: sTag rong), Gesar's paternal uncle.

The windhorse ceremonies are usually conducted in conjunction with the lhasang (wylie: lha bsang, literally "smoke offering to the gods") ritual, in which juniper branches are burned to create thick and fragrant smoke. This is believed to increase the strength in the supplicator of the four nag rtsis elements mentioned above. Often the ritual is called the risang lungta, (wylie: ri bsang rlung ta), the "fumigation offering and (the throwing into the wind or planting) of the rlung ta high in the mountains." The ritual is traditionally "primarily a secular ritual" and "requires no presence of any special officiant whether public or private." The layperson entreats a mountain deity to "increase his fortune like the galloping of a horse and expand his prosperity like the boiling over of milk (rlung ta ta rgyug/ kha rje 'o ma 'phyur 'phyur/).

Namkhai Norbu Rinpoche elaborates on the traditional understanding and etymology of drala:

In many ancient Bön texts the name 'Drala' is spelt sgra bla, which literally means 'la of sound', where la (soul or vitality) stands for a type of individual energy that is also endowed with a protective function. In more recent texts, notably those of the Buddhist tradition, we find the spelling dgra lha, 'deity of the enemy', a term which has been interpreted to mean a warrior deity whose task is to fight one's enemies. [...] Other authors, interpreting the term in the sense of 'deity that conquers the enemy's la' have instead spelt it dgra bla, 'enemy's la'.

[...] The spelling sgra bla ('la of sound') found in the ancient texts as a matter of fact is based on a very deep principle characteristic of the most authentic Bön tradition. Sound, albeit not visible, can be perceived through the sense of hearing and used as a means of communication, and is in fact linked to the cha (the individual's positive force, the base of prosperity), wang tang (ascendancy-capacity), and all the other aspects of a person's energy, aspects that are directly related with the protective deities and entities that every person has from birth. Moreover, sound is considered the foremost connection between the individual himself and his la. From all this we can easily understand the deep meaning of the word sgra bla.

=== The Syncretism of Rime and Jamgon Ju Mipham Gyatso ===
The nineteenth century lamas of the Rime movement, particularly the great scholar Ju Mipham, began to "create a systematic interweaving of native shamanism, oral epic, and Buddhist tantra, alchemical Taoism, Dzogchen, and the strange, vast Kalachakra tantra," and the folk traditions were increasingly given Buddhist connotations and used in Buddhist contexts. Mipham's edition of the Epic of Gesar, which Robin Kornman, a Tibetan Buddhist scholar and student of Chögyam Trungpa, saw as the cornerstone of Trungpa's Shambhala teachings, "was a hybrid of Buddhist and local idea. He made sure it would be read this manner by writing a parallel set of Gesar chants that mix religions in the same way." As Kornman writes, one such typical chant is "a careful combination of Buddhism according to the Nyingma sect with local religion." According to Kornman, "In the Na volume of Mipham's collected works one finds numerous very short supplications to Gesar ...Trungpa Rinpoche lifted the above supplications from Mipham's Gesar cycle and gave them to his advanced students to chant."

Kornman asserts that Trungpa "wrote his Epic of Lha [his first Shambhala tradition text] within this tradition, conscious of the synthesis his gurus had effected. He became in effect the chief spokesman in the West for this syncretic system." The Dzogchen Ponlop Rinpoche, a younger colleague of Trungpa Rinpoche, notes that Trungpa "introduced many Tibetan cultural practices through the Shambhala teachings, such as the lhasang (purification ceremony), along with practices associated with drala and werma (deities)."

Kornman summaries Trungpa's use of antecedent traditions in the creation of his Shambhala teachings as follows:

The philosopher king and the political leadership of his idealized society were people who ruled by virtue of private mystical realizations. The one who sees the phenomenal world as mere appearance and reality as a transcendent other, rules the country and introduces the citizens to his private mystical world. To use tantric terminology, the leader expands the boundaries of the mandala, the private society of his personal students who share the initiatory mysteries, to the entire nation.

This was the theory of the relationship between religion and society that Trungpa Rinpoche elaborated in the West. Its metaphysics was based on the philosophical syncretism of the Eclectic [Rime] movement, which evolved an almost Neoplatonic emanational version of Buddhist mysticism. The mythological machinery, the cosmology of his system, was based on the most complex of all of the Buddhist tantras, the Kalachakra (Wheel of Time) Tantra. But textually it was based on the Tibetan oral epic of King Gesar of Ling, which deployed a non-Buddhist divine machinery based on native Inner Asian shamanistic and animistic religion. The “back text” of Trungpa’s socioreligious system was the Gesar epic. This meant that his model for the relationship between religion and society was what he saw in his region of Tibet, the Sino-Tibetan marches of Kham (Eastern Tibet) and Amdo/Qinghai. In particular, he pointed to the Goloks, nomadic pastoralist warriors, who made the mystery religion of Dzogchen, the great perfection, their public religion through, among other things, the propagation of the oral epic.

=== The Kalachakra tantra ===
As Kornman notes, the Shambhala tradition was not particularly textually based on the Kalachakra tantra. However, as he noted, it does rely on it for some of its "mythological machinery"—in particular, the name and concept of "Shambhala" itself, and the personage of the Rigden (Tib.; wylie: rigs ldan, Sanskrit: Kalki). The Shambhala tradition of Chögyam Trungpa also derives an ethos of syncretism and ecumenicism from the Kalachakra tradition. As John Newman, one of the world's leading Kalachakra scholars, explains:

The Kalachakra, or "Wheel of Time," was the last major product of Indian Vajrayana Buddhism. All late Vajrayana Buddhism is syncretic - it takes elements from non-Buddhist religious traditions and assimilates them to a Buddhist context. However, in the Kalachakra tantra syncretism is unusually obvious and is even self-conscious—the tantra makes little effort to disguise its borrowings from the Śaiva, Vaisnava, and Jaina traditions. The basic structure of the Kalachakra system is itself non-Buddhist: the Kalachakra uses the ancient idea of the homology of the macrocosm and the microcosm as the foundation of its soteriology.

== Controversy ==
At an October 1975 party at Snowmass Colorado Seminary, Trungpa Rinpoche ordered his Vajra guard (i.e., the Dorje Kasung) to forcibly break into the room of his guests W.S. Merwin and Dana Naone, who he then ordered to be brought before the crowd and stripped naked, with onlookers ignoring Naone's pleas for help and for someone to call the police.

In 2018, a third-party investigative report documented multiple reports of sexual misconduct an abuse of power, including allegations of sexual assault and statutory rape, by Sakyong Mipham Rinpoche and a number of other Shambhala spiritual leaders, teachers, and administrators.

In July 2018, following the second of several reports, Sakyong Mipham Rinpoche stepped back from leadership.

In 2019, several Shambala community members and former Shambhala teachers were involved in criminal trials, including one individual who pleaded guilty to sexual assault on a child.
