= Chögyam Trungpa =

Tibetan Buddhist master and writer (1939–1987)

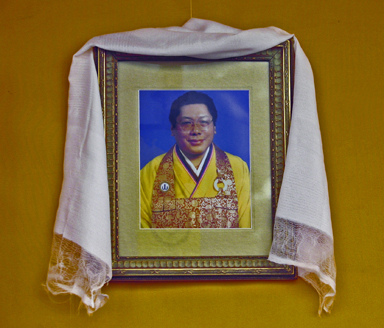
- Title: Tulku

Personal life
- Born: March 5, 1939 Nangchen County, Qinghai Province, Republic of China
- Died: April 4, 1987 (aged 48) Halifax, Nova Scotia, Canada
- Cause of death: Heart attack
- Spouse: Diana Judith Pybus
- Children: 4, including Sakyong Mipham Rinpoche
- Website: http://www.shambhala.org/

Religious life
- Religion: Shambhala Training

Senior posting
- Teacher: Jamgon Kongtrul of Sechen; Dilgo Khyentse Rinpoche; Khenpo Gangshar
- Predecessor: Chökyi Nyinche
- Successor: Choseng Trungpa
- Reincarnation: Trungpa Tulku
- Students: Pema Chödrön, Joni Mitchell, Allen Ginsberg, Reginald Ray, Anne Waldman, Diane di Prima, Peter Lieberson, David Nichtern, José Argüelles, Francisco Varela, Francesca Freemantle, and Joseph Goguen

Chögyam Trungpa (Wylie: Chos rgyam Drung pa; March 5, 1939 – April 4, 1987), formally named the 11th Zurmang Trungpa, Chokyi Gyatso, was a Tibetan Buddhist master and holder of both Kagyu and Nyingma lineages of Tibetan Buddhism. He was recognized by both Tibetan Buddhists and other spiritual practitioners and scholars as a preeminent teacher of Tibetan Buddhism. He was a major figure in the dissemination of Buddhism in the West, founding Vajradhatu and Naropa University and establishing the Shambhala Training method. The 11th of the Trungpa tülkus, he was a tertön, supreme abbot of the Surmang monasteries, scholar, teacher, poet, artist, and originator of Shambhala Buddhist tradition.

Among Trungpa's contributions are the translation of numerous Tibetan Buddhist texts, the introduction of the Vajrayana teachings to the West, and a presentation of Buddhism largely devoid of traditional trappings. Trungpa popularized the term "crazy wisdom", referring to some spiritual masters' unconventional and flamboyant teaching methods. Some of his own methods and actions, particularly his heavy drinking, sexual predation, and his ordering of the sexual assault (forced stripping) of a student and his girlfriend, caused controversy during his lifetime and afterward.

== Biography ==
=== Early years ===
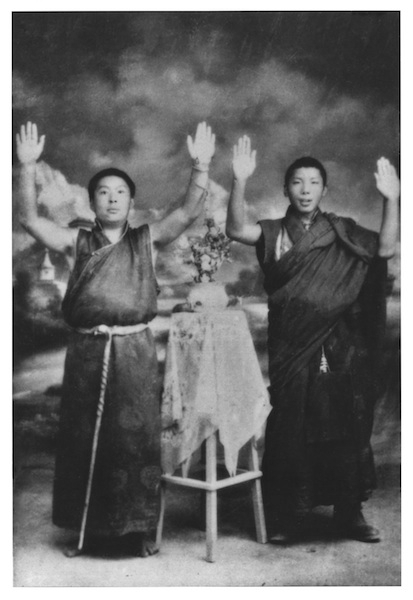
Khenpo Gangshar (left) and Chögyam Trungpa

Born in the Nangchen region of Tibet in March 1939, Chögyam Trungpa was eleventh in the line of Trungpa tülkus, important figures in the Kagyu lineage, one of the four main schools of Tibetan Buddhism. Among his three main teachers were Jamgon Kongtrul of Sechen, HH Dilgo Khyentse Rinpoche, and Khenpo Gangshar.

The name Chögyam is a contraction of Chökyi Gyamtso (Tibetan: ཆོས་ཀྱི་རྒྱ་མཚོ་, Wylie: Chos-kyi Rgya-mtsho), which means "Ocean of Dharma". Trungpa (Tibetan: དྲུང་པ་, Wylie: Drung-pa) means "attendant". He was deeply trained in the Kagyu tradition and received his khenpo degree at the same time as Thrangu Rinpoche; they continued to be very close in later years. Chögyam Trungpa was also trained in the Nyingma tradition, the oldest of the four schools, and was an adherent of the ri-mé ("nonsectarian") ecumenical movement within Tibetan Buddhism, which aspired to bring together and make available all the valuable teachings of the different schools, free of sectarian rivalry.

At the time of his escape from Tibet, Trungpa was head of the Surmang group of monasteries.

=== Escape from Tibet ===
On April 23, 1959, the 20-year-old Trungpa set out on a nine-month escape from his homeland. Masked in his account in Born in Tibet to protect those left behind, the first, preparatory stage of his escape had begun a year earlier, when he fled his home monastery after its occupation by the Chinese People's Liberation Army (PLA). After spending the winter in hiding, he decided definitively to escape after learning that his monastery had been destroyed. Trungpa started with Akong Rinpoche and a small party of Buddhist monastics, but as they traveled people asked to join until the party eventually numbered 300 refugees, from the elderly to mothers with babies. Even the Queen of Nangchen joined for a period. These additions greatly slowed and complicated the journey. Forced to abandon their animals, over half the journey was on foot as the refugees journeyed through an untracked mountain wilderness to avoid the PLA troops. Sometimes lost, sometimes traveling at night, after three months they reached the Brahmaputra River. Trungpa, the monastics and about 70 refugees managed to cross the river under heavy gunfire, then, eating their leather belts and bags to survive, they climbed 19,000 feet over the Himalayas before reaching the safety of Pema Ko. After reaching India, on January 24, 1960, the party was flown to a refugee camp.

Between 2006 and 2010, independent Canadian and French researchers using satellite imagery tracked and confirmed Trungpa's escape route. In 2012, five survivors of the escape in Nepal, Scotland, and the United States confirmed details of the journey and supplied their personal accounts. In 2016 accumulated research and survivors' stories were published in a full retelling of the story, and later in the year preliminary talks began on the funding and production of a movie.

=== Early teachings in the West ===
The 16th Karmapa, Rangjung Rigpe Dorje, was known for seeing the future and made plans accordingly. In 1954, shortly after giving Trungpa the monastic vows, the Karmapa turned to him and said, "In the future you will bring Dharma to the West". At the time, Trungpa wondered what he could be talking about.

In exile in India, Trungpa began his study of English. Freda Bedi then initiated a project with Trungpa and Akong Tulku called the Young Lamas Home School in Dalhousie, India. After seeking endorsement from the 14th Dalai Lama, they were appointed its spiritual director and administrator respectively.

In 1963, with the assistance of Bedi and other sympathetic Westerners, Trungpa received a grant from the Spalding Trust to spend time at Oxford, and was granted "common room" access to St Antony's College, at Oxford University. Akong Rinpoche and another monk shared a flat with Trungpa.

In 1966, after the departure of the western Theravadin monk Ananda Bodhi, the Johnstone House Trust in Scotland invited Trungpa and Akong to take over Ananda Bodhi's meditation center, which in 1967 became Samye Ling, the first Tibetan Buddhist monastery in the West. Musician David Bowie had been one of Ananda Bodhi's meditation students there.

Shortly after his move to Scotland in 1966–67, a variety of experiences including his interactions with his Western students, a solitary retreat in Bhutan, and a car accident that left him partially paralyzed on the left side of his body, led Trungpa to disrobe and return his monastic vows in 1969, in order to work as a lay teacher. He made that decision principally to mitigate students' becoming distracted by exotic cultures and dress and to undercut their preconceptions of how a guru should behave. He drank, smoked, slept with students, and often kept students waiting for hours before giving teachings. Much of his behavior has been construed as deliberately provocative and sparked controversy. In one account, he encouraged students to give up smoking marijuana, claiming that the smoking was not of benefit to their spiritual progress and that it exaggerated neurosis. Students were often angered, unnerved and intimidated by him, but many remained fiercely loyal, committed, and devoted.

In January 1970, he married his student Diana Pybus, with whom he moved to North America. Akong stayed in Scotland at Samye Ling. Trungpa landed in Ontario, and made deeper connections into Nova Scotia. They soon moved to the United States at the invitation of several students, and traveled mostly to Vermont, California, and Colorado, where he was gaining renown for his ability to present Buddhism in a form readily understandable to Western students. He settled in Boulder, Colorado, and grew his sanghas of students. During this period, he conducted 13 Vajradhatu Seminaries, three-month residential programs at which he presented a vast body of Buddhist teachings in an atmosphere of intensive meditation practice. "The seminaries also had the important function of training his students to become teachers themselves."

=== Introduction of the Vajrayana ===
Trungpa was one of the first teachers to introduce Tibetan Buddhism and the Vajrayana to the West. As in Tibet, the schools of the Vajrayana Buddhism and their practices are the domain of everyone, including the monastic sangha, the vow-holding sangha, and the lay sangha. In the United States, Trungpa introduced the Vajrayana mostly to the lay sangha.

The presentation of these teachings gave rise to some criticism. According to Trungpa's former student Stephen Butterfield, "Trungpa told us that if we ever tried to leave the Vajrayana, we would suffer unbearable, subtle, continuous anguish, and disasters would pursue us like furies". Other Vajrayana teachers also warn their students about the dangers of the path.

Butterfield said, "to be part of Trungpa's inner circle, you had to take a vow never to reveal or even discuss some of the things he did." But Butterfield also said, "This personal secrecy is common with gurus, especially in Vajrayana Buddhism", and though he noted "disquieting resemblances" to cults, acknowledged that Trungpa's organization is not a cult: "a mere cult leaves you disgusted and disillusioned, wondering how you could have been a fool. I did not feel that charlatans had hoodwinked me into giving up my powers to enhance theirs. On the contrary, mine were unveiled."

=== Meditation and education centers ===
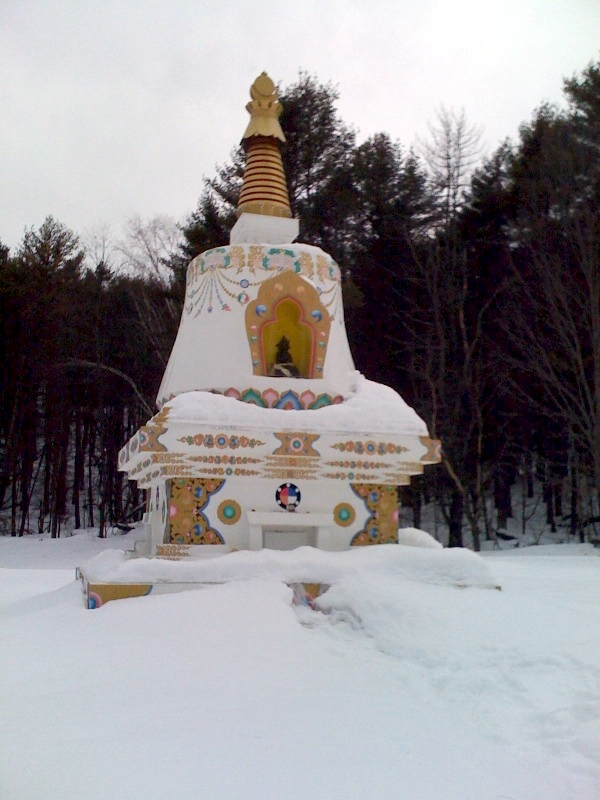
The purkhang at Karmê Chöling

In 1973, Trungpa established Vajradhatu, encompassing all his North American institutions, headquartered in Boulder, Colorado. Trungpa also founded more than 100 meditation centers throughout the world. Originally known as Dharmadhatus, these centers, now more than 150 in number, are known as Shambhala Meditation Centers. He also founded retreat centers for intensive meditation practice, including Rocky Mountain Dharma Center in Red Feather Lakes, Colorado, Karmê Chöling in Barnet, Vermont, and Gampo Abbey in Cape Breton, Nova Scotia.

In 1974, Trungpa founded the Naropa Institute, which later became Naropa University, in Boulder, Colorado. Naropa was the first accredited Buddhist university in North America. Trungpa hired Allen Ginsberg to teach poetry and William Burroughs to teach literature.

Trungpa had a number of notable students, among whom were Pema Chödrön, Allen Ginsberg, Peter Orlovsky, Anne Waldman, Diane di Prima, Peter Lieberson, John Steinbeck IV, José Argüelles, David Nichtern, Ken Wilber, David Deida, Francisco Varela, and Joni Mitchell, who portrayed Trungpa in the song "Refuge of the Roads" on her 1976 album Hejira. Ginsberg, Waldman, and di Prima also taught at Naropa University, and in the 1980s Marianne Faithfull taught songwriting workshops. Lesser-known students Trungpa taught in England and the US include Alf Vial, Rigdzin Shikpo (né Michael Hookham), Jigme Rinzen (né P. Howard Useche), Karma Tendzin Dorje (né Mike Crowley), Ezequiel Hernandez Urdaneta (known as Keun-Tshen Goba after setting up his first meditation center in Venezuela), Miguel Otaola (aka Dorje Khandro), Francisco Salas Roche, German financier Burkhard Brauch (aka Chugai Keisho), and Francesca Fremantle. Rigdzin Shikpo promulgated Trungpa's teachings from a primarily Nyingma rather than Kagyü point of view at the Longchen Foundation.

=== Shambhala vision ===
In 1976, Trungpa began giving a series of secular teachings, some of which were gathered and presented as the Shambhala Training, inspired by his vision of the legendary Kingdom of Shambhala. Trungpa actually started writing about Shambhala before his 1959 escape from Tibet to India, but most of those writings were lost during the escape.

In his view not only was individual enlightenment not mythical, but the Shambhala Kingdom, an enlightened society, could in fact be actualized. The practice of Shambhala vision is to use mindfulness/awareness meditation as a way to connect with one's basic goodness and confidence. It is presented as a path that "brings dignity, confidence, and wisdom to every facet of life." Trungpa proposed to lead the Kingdom as sakyong (Tib. "earth protector") with his wife as queen-consort or sakyong wangmo.

Shambhala vision is described as a non-religious approach rooted in meditation and accessible to individuals of any, or no, religion. In Shambhala terms, it is possible, moment by moment, for individuals to establish enlightened society. His book, Shambhala: The Sacred Path of the Warrior, provides a concise collection of the Shambhala views. According to Trungpa, it was his intention to propagate the Kingdom of Shambala that provided the necessary inspiration to leave his homeland and make the arduous journey to India and the West.

=== Work with arts and sciences ===
From the beginning of his time in the United States, Trungpa encouraged his students to integrate a contemplative approach into their everyday activities. In addition to making a variety of traditional contemplative practices available to the community, he incorporated his students' already existing interests (especially anything relating to Japanese culture), evolving specialized teachings on a meditative approach to these various disciplines. These included kyūdō (Japanese archery), calligraphy, ikebana (flower arranging), Sadō (Japanese tea ceremony), dance, theater, film, poetry, photography, health care, and psychotherapy. His aim was, in his own words, to bring "art to everyday life." He founded the Nalanda Foundation in 1974 as an umbrella organization for these activities, but changed its name to Naropa Institute.

=== Death ===
Trungpa visited Nova Scotia for the first time in 1977. In 1983 he established Gampo Abbey, a Karma Kagyü monastery in Cape Breton. The following year, 1984–85, he observed a yearlong retreat at Mill Village and in 1986 he moved his home and Vajradhatu's international headquarters to Halifax.

By then he was in failing health due to paralysis from the 1969 auto accident, diabetes, high blood pressure, and years of heavy alcohol use. On September 28, 1986, he suffered cardiac arrest, after which his condition deteriorated, requiring intensive care at the hospital, then at his home and finally, in mid-March 1987, back at the hospital, where he died on April 4, 1987.

In 2006 his widow, Diana Mukpo, wrote, "Although he had many of the classic health problems that develop from heavy drinking, it was in fact more likely the diabetes and high blood pressure that led to abnormal blood sugar levels and then the cardiac arrest". Trungpa's doctor Michael Levy concurred in his initial statement, and added that a bacterial infection likely caused his death. In a 2008 interview for the Chronicles of Chogyam Trungpa, Levy changed his statement when asked again "What was he ill with? What did he die of?" He added that Trungpa also "had chronic liver disease related to his alcohol intake over many years." One of Trungpa's nursing attendants reported that he suffered in his last months from classic symptoms of terminal alcoholism and cirrhosis, yet continued drinking heavily. She added, "At the same time there was a power about him and an equanimity to his presence that was phenomenal, that I don't know how to explain."

His body was packed in salt, laid in a wooden box, and conveyed to Karmê Chöling. On 26 May 1987, more than 2,000 students and friends and Tibetan Buddhist masters including Dilgo Khyentse Rinpoche, the 12th Tai Situ Rinpoche, the 3rd Jamgon Kongtrul Rinpoche, and the 12th Tsurpu Gyeltsab, Drakpa Tenpa Yarpel Rinpoche, attended Trungpa's cremation ceremony before his kudung was interred in a stupa at Shambhala Mountain Center. Attendants at the ceremony at Karmê Chöling witnessed that the ceremony was accompanied by rainbows, circling eagles, and a cloud in the shape of an Ashe as symbolic of enlightenment. "Everyone who stayed long enough at Trungpa's cremation saw the rainbows", Butterfield said.

=== Continuation of the Shambhala lineage ===
Upon Trungpa's death, the leadership of Vajradhatu was first carried on by his American disciple, appointed Vajra Regent, and Dharma heir Ösel Tendzin. Among Tendzin's controversial actions was his rejection of the recommendation of senior Kagyu lineage holder the Tai Situpa to take over leadership of Vajradhatu in conjunction with Trungpa's half-brother, Damchu Tenphel, who resided in Tibet. This was "regarded by members as a serious slight to lineage authorities and was construed as the Regent's attempt to secure his position of control".

Also controversial was that Tendzin "took further action to buttress his centrality by denying students permission to seek teachings from other Kagyu Tibetan teachers, claiming that only he possessed the special transmission, materials and knowledge unique to the Trungpa lineage. Students were told that if they wanted to practice within the community, they would have to take spiritual instruction from the Regent."

Other behavior was troubling as well. As one scholar who has studied the community noted, Tendzin was "bisexual and known to be very promiscuous" and "enjoyed seducing straight men" but the community "did not find [this behavior] particularly troublesome". Not all his partners were unwilling; one scholar said "it became a mark of prestige for a man, gay or straight, to have sex with the Regent, just as it had been for a woman to have sex with [Trungpa] Rinpoche", but at least one student reported that Tendzin had raped him. As a former Vajradhatu member attested, "a chilling story had recently been reported by one of ... [the] teachers at the Buddhist private school [for the Vajradhatu community]. This straight, married male was pinned face-down across Rich's desk by the guards [the Dorje Kasung] while Rich forcibly raped him."

In 1989 it was revealed that Ösel Tendzin had contracted HIV and knowingly continued to have unprotected sex with his students, without informing them for nearly three years. Some of these students later died of AIDS. Others close to Tendzin, including Vajradhatu's board of directors, knew for two years that Tendzin was HIV-positive and sexually active but kept silent. As one student reported at the time:

I was very distressed that he and his entourage had lied to us for so long, always saying he did not have AIDS. I was even more distressed over the stories of how the Regent used his position as a dharma teacher to induce "straight" students to have unprotected sex with him, while he claimed he had been tested for AIDS but the result was negative.

Shambhala's leadership then passed on to Trungpa's eldest son and Shambhala heir, Sakyong Mipham Rinpoche. In 2018, Buddhist Project Sunshine, an organization founded as a survivors' network for former Shambhala Buddhist members, reported multiple allegations of sexual assault within the Shambhala community. In response, and to allow time for the community to investigate these accusations, Sakyong Mipham temporarily stepped aside as leader, and the Shambhala governing council resigned and appointed an interim Board of Directors and a Process Team. In response, Sakyong Mipham issued a letter to the community, saying:

some of these women have shared experiences of feeling harmed as a result of these relationships. I am now making a public apology. In addition, I would like you to know that over the years, I have apologized personally to people who have expressed feeling harmed by my conduct, including some of those who have recently shared their stories. I have also engaged in mediation and healing practices with those who have felt harmed. Thus I have been, and will continue to be, committed to healing these wounds.

After the allegations of sexual misconduct, Naropa Institute removed Sakyong Mipham from its board in 2018. In 2020, The Walrus published an investigative report detailing a culture of abuse dating to Shambhala's earliest days, with all three leaders of the organization, including Chögyam Trungpa, having been credibly accused of sexual misconduct and abuse of power.

== Acclaim ==
Major lineage holders of Trungpa's Tibetan Buddhist traditions and many other Buddhist teachers supported his work.

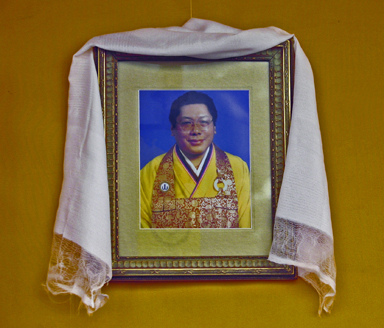
Chogyam Trungpa Rinpoche

In 1974, Trungpa invited the 16th Gyalwa Karmapa, head of the Karma Kagyu lineage, to come to the West and offer teachings. Based on this visit, the Karmapa proclaimed Trungpa one of the principal Kagyu lineage holders in the West:

The ancient and renowned lineage of the Trungpas, since the great siddha Trungmase Chökyi Gyamtso Lodrö, possessor of only holy activity, has in every generation given rise to great beings. Awakened by the vision of these predecessors in the lineage, this my present lineage holder, Chökyi Gyamtso Trungpa Rinpoche, supreme incarnate being, has magnificently carried out the vajra holders' discipline in the land of America, bringing about the liberation of students and ripening them in the dharma. This wonderful truth is clearly manifest.

Accordingly, I empower Chögyam Trungpa Vajra Holder and Possessor of the Victory Banner of the Practice Lineage of the Karma Kagyu. Let this be recognized by all people of both elevated and ordinary station.

In 1981, Trungpa and his students hosted the 14th Dalai Lama in his visit to Boulder, Colorado. Of Trungpa, the Dalai Lama later wrote, "Exceptional as one of the first Tibetan lamas to become fully assimilated into Western culture, he made a powerful contribution to revealing the Tibetan approach to inner peace in the West."

Trungpa also received support from one of his own main teachers, Dilgo Khyentse Rinpoche, head of the Nyingma lineage. In addition to numerous sadhana and poems dedicated to Trungpa, Khyentse Rinpoche wrote a supplication after Trungpa's death specifically naming him a mahasiddha. Among the Tibetan Rinpoches to name Trungpa a mahasiddha are the Sixteenth Karmapa, Thrangu Rinpoche, Khenpo Tsultrim Gyamtso Rinpoche and Tai Situpa Rinpoche.

The Dzogchen Ponlop Rinpoche said, "As taught in the Buddhist scriptures, there are nine qualities of a perfect master of buddhadharma. The Eleventh Chögyam Trungpa Rinpoche possessed all nine of these."

Suzuki Roshi, founder of the San Francisco Zen Center and Tassajara Zen Mountain Center, and another important exponent of Buddhism to western students, described Trungpa in the context of a talk about emptiness:

The way you can struggle with this is to be supported by something, something you don't know. As we are human beings, there must be that kind of feeling. You must feel it in this city or building or community. So whatever community it may be, it is necessary for it to have this kind of spiritual support.

That is why I respect Trungpa Rinpoche. He is supporting us. You may criticize him because he drinks alcohol like I drink water, but that is a minor problem. He trusts you completely. He knows that if he is always supporting you in a true sense you will not criticize him, whatever he does. And he doesn't mind whatever you say. That is not the point, you know. This kind of big spirit, without clinging to some special religion or form of practice, is necessary for human beings.

Gehlek Rinpoche, who lived with Trungpa when they were young monks in India and later visited and taught with him in the U.S., remarked:

He was a great Tibetan yogi, a friend, and a master. The more I deal with Western Dharma students, the more I appreciate how he presented the dharma and the activities that he taught. Whenever I meet with difficulties, I begin to understand – sometimes before solving the problem, sometimes afterward – why Trungpa Rinpoche did some unconventional things. I do consider him to be the father of Tibetan Buddhism in the United States. In my opinion, he left very early – too early. His death was a great loss. Everything he did is significant.

Diana Mukpo, his wife, stated:

First, Rinpoche always wanted feedback. He very, very much encouraged his students' critical intelligence. One of the reasons that people were in his circle was that they were willing to be honest and direct with him. He definitely was not one of those teachers who asked for obedience and wanted their students not to think for themselves. He thrived, he lived, on the intelligence of his students. That is how he built his entire teaching situation.

From my perspective, I could always be pretty direct with him. Maybe I was not hesitant to do that because I really trusted the unconditional nature of our relationship. I felt there was really nothing to lose by being absolutely direct with him, and he appreciated that.

== Controversies ==
[Trungpa] caused more trouble, and did more good, than anyone I'll ever know.

— Rick Fields, historian of Buddhism in America

Trungpa's teaching style was often unconventional. He felt that "compassion is not so much being kind; it is being creative to wake a person up."

Trungpa cultivated sexual relationships with a number of his female students and reportedly had multiple "spiritual wives," some of whom were minors and some of whom described physical and emotional abuse from Trungpa. Trungpa formally renounced his monastic vows in 1969.

Trungpa was also known for smoking tobacco and liberally using alcohol; many who knew him characterized him as an alcoholic. He began drinking occasionally shortly after arriving in India. Before coming to the United States, Trungpa drove a sports car into a joke shop in Gateshead in North-East England, May 1969. While his companion was not seriously injured, Trungpa was left partially paralyzed. Later, he described this event as a pivotal moment that inspired the course of his teachings. Some accounts ascribe the accident to drinking. Others suggest he may have had a stroke. According to Trungpa himself, he blacked out.

Trungpa often combined drinking with teaching. In some instances Trungpa was too drunk to walk and had to be carried. Also, according to his student John Steinbeck IV and his wife, on a couple of occasions Trungpa's speech was unintelligible. One woman reported serving him "big glasses of gin first thing in the morning."

The Steinbecks wrote The Other Side of Eden, a sharply critical memoir of their lives with Trungpa in which they claim that, in addition to alcohol, he spent $40,000 a year on cocaine, and used Seconal to come down from the cocaine. The Steinbecks said the cocaine use was kept secret from the wider Vajradhatu community.

One well-known controversial incident occurred at the Halloween party at Snowmass Colorado Seminary in 1975. which the poet W. S. Merwin and his girlfriend, Hawaiian poet Dana Naone, attended. At the party, after many, including Trungpa himself, had taken off their clothes, Merwin was asked to participate but refused. On Trungpa's orders, his Vajra Guard forced entry into the poet's locked and barricaded room; brought him and his girlfriend, Dana Naone, against their will, to the party; and stripped them of all their clothes, with onlookers ignoring Naone's pleas for help and for someone to call the police. The next day Trungpa asked Merwin and Naone to remain at the Seminary as either students or guests. They agreed to stay for several more weeks to hear the Vajrayana teachings, with Trungpa's promise that "there would be no more incidents" and Merwin's that there would be "no guarantees of obedience, trust, or personal devotion to him." They left immediately after the last talk. In a 1977 letter to members of a Naropa class investigating the incident, Merwin concluded,

My feelings about Trungpa have been mixed from the start. Admiration, throughout, for his remarkable gifts; and reservations, which developed into profound misgivings, concerning some of his uses of them. I imagine, at least, that I've learned some things from him (though maybe not all of them were the things I was "supposed" to learn) and some through him, and I'm grateful to him for those. I wouldn't encourage anyone to become a student of his. I wish him well.

The incident became known to a wider public when Tom Clark published "The Great Naropa Poetry Wars". The Naropa Institute later asked Ed Sanders and his class to conduct an internal investigation, resulting in a lengthy report. Author Jeffery Paine noted the outrage felt in particular by poets such as Robert Bly and Kenneth Rexroth after this incident, who began calling Trungpa a fascist.

Eliot Weinberger commented on the incident in a critique aimed at Trungpa and Allen Ginsberg published in The Nation on April 19, 1980. He complained that the fascination of some of the best minds of his generation with Trungpa's presentation of Tibetan Buddhism and Tibetan theocracy created a dangerous exclusivity and elitism.

Trungpa's choice of Westerner Ösel Tendzin as his dharma heir was controversial, as Tendzin was the first Western Tibetan Buddhist lineage holder and Vajra Regent. This was exacerbated by Tendzin's own behavior as lineage holder; while knowingly HIV-positive, Tendzin was sexually involved with students, some of whom he raped, and one of whom became infected and died.

== Chronology ==
1939: Born in the Nangchen Kingdom, Kham, Eastern Tibet. Enthroned as the Eleventh Trungpa Tulku, supreme abbot of the Surmang monasteries, and governor of Surmang District. Some put his birth in 1940.

1944–1959: Studies traditional monastic disciplines, meditation, and philosophy, as well as calligraphy, thangka painting, and monastic dance.

1947: Ordained as a getsul (novice monk).

1958: Receives degrees of Kyorpön (recitation master) and Khenpo (equivalent to MPhil or PhD). Ordained as a bhikshu (full monk).

1959–1960: Decides to escape from Tibet after hearing about the 1959 Tibetan uprising in Lhasa, during which the 14th Dalai Lama escaped to India as the 1959 Tibetan uprising failed to overthrow the occupation by the Chinese government.

1960–1963: By appointment of the Fourteenth Dalai Lama, serves as spiritual advisor to the Young Lamas' Home School in Dalhousie, India.

1962: Fathers his first son, Ösel Rangdröl Mukpo, with Tibetan nun Konchok Peldron (1931–2019), who later joined Shambhala and was referred to as Lady Konchok Peldron.

1963–1967: Attends Oxford University and resides at St. Anthony's College, supported by a Spalding Fellowship. He studies comparative religion, philosophy, and fine arts. Receives instructor's degree of the Sogetsu School of ikebana (Japanese flower arrangement).

1966-1967: In Scotland, establishes together with Akong Rinpoche the monastery Samye Ling, in Dumfriesshire. Named after the first monastery in Tibet Samye, Samye Ling becomes the first Tibetan monastery in the West.

1968: By royal invitation, travels to Bhutan and goes on solitary retreat at Paro Taktsang. Receives terma text while on retreat in the sacred cliffside monastery in Bhutan, where Guru Padmasambhava and Yeshe Tsogyal also practiced.

1969: Becomes a Tibetan-born British subject, 10 February. On May 5, injured in a car accident, leaving him partially paralyzed on his left side. Accident reported in Newcastle Evening Chronicle, May 6. In October, returns his monastic vows and disrobes. States that the dharma needs to be free of cultural trappings to take root.

1970: On January 3, marries upper-class 16-year-old Scottish student Diana Judith Pybus. British media storm follows.

1970: Arrives in Canada before visiting Vermont, California, and Colorado. Establishes Tail of the Tiger, a Buddhist meditation and study center in Vermont, now named Karmê Chöling. Establishes Karma Dzong, a Buddhist community in Boulder, Colorado (now known as Boulder Shambhala Center).

1971: Begins teaching at University of Colorado. Establishes Rocky Mountain Dharma Center near Fort Collins, Colorado (now known as Shambhala Mountain Center).

1972: Brings son Ösel Rangdröl Mukpo (the future Sakyong) to the U.S. from Britain. Initiates Maitri, a therapeutic program that works with different styles of mental conditions using principles of the Five Buddha Families. Conducts the Milarepa Film Workshop, a program that analyzes the aesthetics of film, on Lookout Mountain, Colorado.

1973: Established Mudra Theater Group, which stages original plays and practices theater exercises, based on Tibetan cham dance. Incorporates Vajradhatu, an international association of Buddhist meditation and study centers, later renamed as Shambhala International. Establishes Dorje Khyung Dzong, a retreat facility in southern Colorado. Conducts first annual Vajradhatu Seminary, a three-month advanced practice and study program for future Shambhala teachers.

1974: Incorporates Nalanda Foundation, a nonprofit, nonsectarian educational organization to encourage and organize programs in the fields of education, psychology, and the arts. Hosts the first North American visit of the 16th Gyalwa Karmapa, head of the Karma Kagyü lineage. Changes the name of Nalanda to the Naropa Institute, a contemplative studies and liberal arts college, now fully accredited as Naropa University. Forms the organization that will become the Dorje Kasung, a service group entrusted with the protection of Buddhist teachings and the welfare of the community.

1975: Forms the organization that will become the Shambhala Lodge, a group of students dedicated to fostering enlightened society. Establishes the Nalanda Translation Committee for the translation of Buddhist texts from Tibetan and Sanskrit. Establishes Ashoka Credit Union.

1976: Hosts the first North American visit of Dilgo Khyentse Rinpoche, great master and scholar of the Nyingma lineage. Hosts a visit of Kyabje Dudjom Rinpoche, head of the Nyingma lineage. Empowers Thomas F. Rich as his dharma heir, known thereafter as Vajra Regent Ösel Tendzin. Establishes the Kalapa Court in Boulder as his residence and a cultural center for the Vajradhatu community. Receives the first of several Shambhala terma texts. These comprise the literary source for the Shambhala teachings. Establishes Alaya Preschool in Boulder.

1977: Bestows the Vajrayogini abhisheka for the first time in the West for students who have completed the preliminary ngöndro practice. Establishes the celebration of Shambhala Day. Founds Shambhala Training to promote a secular approach to meditation practice and an appreciation of basic human goodness. Visits Nova Scotia for the first time.

1977-1978: Observes his first yearlong retreat in North America, at Charlemont, Massachusetts. Delivers his talk "Famous Last Words" on 24 January before departing.

1978: Conducts the first annual Magyal Pomra Encampment, an advanced training program for members of the Dorje Kasung. Conducts the first annual Kalapa Assembly, an intensive training program for advanced Shambhala teachings and practices. Conducts the first Dharma Art seminar. Forms Amara, an association of health professionals. Forms the Upaya Council, a mediation council providing a forum for resolving disputes. Establishes the Midsummer's Day festival and Children's Day.

1979: Empowers his eldest son, Ösel Rangdröl Mukpo, as his successor and heir to the Shambhala lineage. Founds the Shambhala School of Dressage, an equestrian school under the direction of his wife, Diana Mukpo. Founds Vidya Elementary School in Boulder.

1980–1983: Presents a series of environmental installations and flower arranging exhibitions at art galleries in Los Angeles, San Francisco, Denver, and Boulder.

1980: Forms Kalapa Cha to promote the practice of traditional Japanese tea ceremony. With the Nalanda Translation Committee, completes the first English translation of The Rain of Wisdom.

1981: Hosts the visit of the Fourteenth Dalai Lama to Boulder. Conducts the first annual Buddhist-Christian Conference in Boulder, exploring the common ground between Buddhist and Christian contemplative traditions. Forms Ryuko Kyūdōjō to promote the practice of Kyūdō under the direction of Shibata Kanjuro Sensei, bow maker to the Emperor of Japan. Directs a film, Discovering Elegance, using footage of his environmental installation and flower arranging exhibitions.

1982: Forms Kalapa Ikebana to promote the study and practice of Japanese flower arranging.

1983: Establishes Gampo Abbey, a Karma Kagyü monastery in Cape Breton, Nova Scotia, for Western students wishing to enter into traditional monastic discipline. Creates a series of elocution exercises to promote precision and mindfulness of speech.

1984–1985: Observes a second year-long retreat in North America, in Mill Village, Nova Scotia.

1986: Moves his home and the international headquarters of Vajradhatu to Halifax, Nova Scotia.

1987: Dies in Halifax. His cremation ceremony was held on May 26 at Karmê Chöling. The Great Stupa of Dharmakaya at Shambhala Mountain Center, near Red Feather Lakes, Colorado, houses his kudung, or his bodily remains.

1989: The child recognized as his reincarnation or tulku, Chokyi Sengay, is born in Derge, Tibet; recognized two years later by Tai Situ Rinpoche.

== Publications ==
- Born in Tibet (1966). An autobiography relating his escape from Tibet.
- Meditation in Action (1969)
- Mudra (1972)
- Cutting Through Spiritual Materialism (1973)
- The Dawn of Tantra. Co-authored with Herbert V. Guenther. (1975)
- Glimpses of Abhidharma (1975)
- The Tibetan Book of the Dead: The Great Liberation through Hearing in the Bardo. Translated with commentary by Francesca Fremantle and Chögyam Trungpa (1975)
- Visual Dharma: The Buddhist Art of Tibet (1975)
- The Myth of Freedom and the Way of Meditation (1976)
- The Rain of Wisdom (1980)
- Journey without Goal: The Tantric Wisdom of the Buddha (1981)
- The Life of Marpa the Translator (1982)
- First Thought Best Thought: 108 Poems (1983)
- Shambhala: The Sacred Path of the Warrior (1984)
- Crazy Wisdom (1991)
- The Heart of the Buddha (1991)
- Orderly Chaos: The Mandala Principle (1991)
- Secret Beyond Thought: The Five Chakras and the Four Karmas (1991)
- The Lion's Roar: An Introduction to Tantra (1992)
- Transcending Madness: The Experience of the Six Bardos (1992)
- Training the Mind and Cultivating Loving Kindness (1993)
- Glimpses of Shunyata (1993)
- The Art of Calligraphy: Joining Heaven and Earth (1994)
- Illusion's Game: The Life and Teaching of Naropa (1994)
- The Path Is the Goal: A Basic Handbook of Buddhist Meditation (1995)
- Dharma Art (1996)
- Timely Rain: Selected Poetry of Chögyam Trungpa (1998)
- Great Eastern Sun: The Wisdom of Shambhala (1999)
- Glimpses of Space: The Feminine Principle and Evam (1999)
- The Essential Chögyam Trungpa (2000)
- Glimpses of Mahayana (2001)
- Glimpses of Realization (2003)
- The Collected Works of Chögyam Trungpa Published in eight volumes. (2003)
- True Command: The Teachings of the Dorje Kasung (2004)
- The Sanity We Are Born With: A Buddhist Approach to Psychology (2005)
- The Teacup & the Skullcup: Chogyam Trungpa on Zen and Tantra (2007)
- The Mishap Lineage: Transforming Confusion into Wisdom (2009)
- Smile at Fear: Awakening the True Heart of Bravery (2010)
- The Truth of Suffering and the Path of Liberation (2010)
- Work, Sex, Money. Real Life on the Path of Mindfulness (2011)
- The Profound Treasury of the Ocean of Dharma (2013)
- The Path of Individual Liberation (2013)
- The Bodhisattava Path of Wisdom and Compassion (2013)
- The Tantric Path of Indestructible Wakefulness (2013)
- Training the Mind and Cultivating Loving-Kindness (2013)
- Devotion and Crazy Wisdom: Teachings on the Sadhana of Mahamudra (2015)
- Glimpses of the Profound: Four Short Works (2016)
- Mindfulness in Action: Making Friends with Yourself through Meditation and Everyday Awareness (2016)
- Milarepa: Lessons from the Life and Songs of Tibet's Great Yogi (2017)
- The Future Is Open: Good Karma, Bad Karma, and Beyond Karma (2018)
- Cynicism and Magic: Intelligence and Intuition on the Buddhist Path (2021)
- The Sadhana of Mahamudra: Teachings on Devotion and Crazy Wisdom (2025)

== See also ==
- Buddhism in the United States
- Charles H. Percy
- Ken Keyes, Jr.
- List of deaths through alcohol
- Miksang (contemplative photography)
- Samaya
- Tulku (film), documentary by Trungpa's son Gesar Mukpo
