= Tukdam =

Buddhist post-mortem meditation

In the Vajrayana tradition of Tibetan Buddhism, tukdam (Standard Tibetan: ཐུགས་དམ, Wylie: thugs dam) is a meditative state said to occur after clinical death, in which the body apparently shows minimal signs of decomposition, retaining a lifelike appearance for days or even weeks. Practitioners are believed by Buddhists to be in a profound state of meditation, merging their consciousness with the Clear Light. Buddhist tradition considers that tukdam is available to all people, but only the expert practitioners of meditation, when dying, can recognize it and use it for spiritual purposes.

== Description ==
Practitioners believe that one's consciousness can remain in a meditative state known as the "Clear Light Stage" after death. A person is claimed to exist in this state anywhere from a minute to weeks, depending on the level of their realization, but only expert practitioners of meditation, when dying, can recognize it and use it for spiritual purposes. As Sogyal Rinpoche describes it in The Tibetan Book of Living and Dying:

A realized practitioner continues to abide by the recognition of the nature of mind at the moment of death, and awakens into the Ground Luminosity when it manifests. He or she may even remain in that state for a number of days. Some practitioners and masters die sitting upright in that state for a number of days. Some practitioners and masters die sitting upright in meditation posture, and others in the "posture of the sleeping lion". Besides their perfect poise, there will be other signs that show they are resting in the state of the Ground Luminosity: There is still a certain color and glow in their face, the nose does not sink inward, the skin remains soft and flexible, the body does not become stiff, the eyes are said to keep a soft and compassionate glow, and there is still a warmth at the heart. Great care is taken that the master's body is not touched, and silence is maintained until he or she has arisen from this state of meditation.

The appearance of people that entered tukdam, in tantric view, is described as "radiant", with the skin maintaining its softness and elasticity. Exit is manifested by the body beginning to decompose.

A 2021 study, using electroencephalograhy, did not detect any brain activity in clinically dead tukdam when examined in the days after death.

== Cultural and religious significance ==
Tukdam is rarely mentioned explicitly in the canon texts of Tibetan Buddhism. It holds profound cultural and religious significance within Tibetan Buddhism. It is viewed as a manifestation of a practitioner's mastery over the mind and the death process.

In Tibetan Buddhism, death is not seen as an end but a transition. The state of tukdam represents an advanced level of spiritual attainment where the practitioner's consciousness remains in meditation after clinical death, merging into the Clear Light or Ground Luminosity. This concept is extensively discussed in Tibetan texts such as The Tibetan Book of Living and Dying by Sogyal Rinpoche. Rinpoche writes that a realized practitioner recognizes the nature of mind at the moment of death and awakens into the Ground Luminosity, remaining in that state for several days. The body is typically not disturbed or moved until signs of tukdam have ceased, reflecting the belief that the consciousness is still present and active.

Books such as Death and Rebirth in Tibetan Buddhism, by Lati Rinpoche and Jeffrey Hopkins, and Mind Beyond Death, by Dzogchen Ponlop Rinpoche, further explore the spiritual and philosophical underpinnings of tukdam. Additionally, scholarly research and personal accounts of tukdam, as compiled in Testimonies of Tibetan Tulkus: A Research Among Reincarnate Buddhist Masters in Exile by Dieter Bärlocher, document the experiences and teachings of those who are believed to have attained this state.

The tradition became more popular among Tibetan exiles after the 14th Dalai Lama's call for scientific research into the matter.

== See also ==
- Consciousness after death – Postulated continued existence after death
- Death and culture – Role of death in several cultures
- Sokushinbutsu – Buddhist mummification
