= Freda Bedi =

English-Indian social worker, writer, Indian nationalist and Buddhist nun (1911–1977)

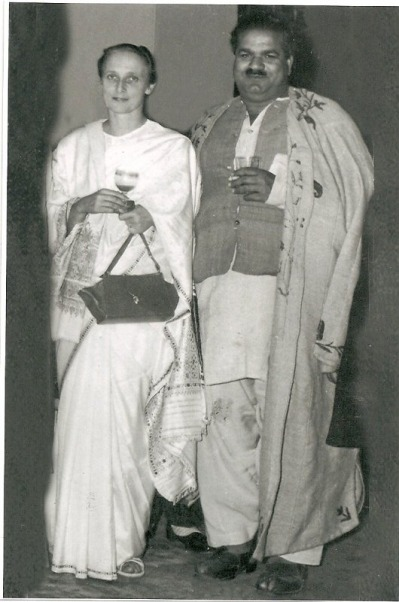
- Freda Bedi and Baba Pyare Lal Bedi, at Nishat Bagh, Srinagar, 1948
- Title: Gelongma

Personal life
- Born: Freda Marie Houlston; 5 February 1911 Derby, England
- Died: 26 March 1977 (aged 66) New Delhi, India
- Spouse: Baba Pyare Lal Bedi (m. 1933)
- Children: 3, including Kabir Bedi
- Education: Parkfield Cedars School; St Hugh's College, Oxford
- Other name: Sister Palmo
- Occupation: Social worker, writer, translator

Religious life
- Religion: Tibetan Buddhism
- School: Kagyu
- Lineage: Karma Kagyu
- Dharma name: Karma Kechog Palmo

Senior posting
- Teacher: 16th Karmapa

Freda Bedi (born Freda Marie Houlston; 5 February 1911 – 26 March 1977), also known as Sister Palmo or Gelongma Karma Kechog Palmo, was an English-Indian social worker, writer, Indian nationalist and Buddhist nun. She was jailed in British India as a supporter of Indian nationalism and was the first Western woman to take full ordination in Tibetan Buddhism.

== Early life and education ==
Freda Marie Houlston was born in a flat above her father's jewellery and watch repair business in Monk Street in Derby. When she was still a baby, the family moved to Littleover, a suburb of Derby.

Freda's father served in the First World War and was enrolled in the Machine Guns Corps. He was killed in northern France on 14 April 1918. Her mother, Nellie, remarried in 1920, to Frank Norman Swan. Freda studied at Hargrave House and then at Parkfields Cedars School, both in Derby. She also spent several months studying at a school in Rheims in northern France. She succeeded in gaining admission to St Hugh's College, Oxford to study French, being awarded an Exhibition or minor scholarship.

== Life at Oxford ==
At Oxford, Freda Houlston changed her subject from French to Philosophy, Politics and Economics (PPE). She met her husband Baba Pyare Lal "BPL" Bedi, an Indian from Lahore, in her PPE course. He was a Sikh whose family traced back to Guru Nanak Dev Ji. Romance blossomed and they married at Oxford Registry Office in June 1933, in spite of the reservations of her family and disciplinary action by her college.

Whilst at Oxford Freda became involved in politics. She attended meetings of the Oxford Majlis, where nationalist-minded Indian students gathered, as well as of the communist October Club and the Labour Club. This was another bond with BPL Bedi, who became a keen communist and opponent of Empire. The couple together edited four books on India's struggle for Independence. At St Hugh's her closest friends included Barbara Castle, later a prominent Labour cabinet minister, and the broadcaster Olive Shapley. All three women graduated with a third-class degree; Freda's husband got a fourth-class degree.

== Life in India ==
After a year in Berlin where B.P.L. Bedi was studying - and where their first child, Ranga, was born - Freda, her husband and baby son sailed to India in 1934. She worked as a journalist and taught English at a women's college in Lahore, and with her husband published a high quality quarterly review Contemporary India. They also later published a weekly political paper, Monday Morning. Freda regularly contributed articles to Lahore's main nationalist daily, The Tribune. Both she and her husband were leftists and campaigning nationalists active in India's independence movement. The couple's second child, Tilak, died when less than a year old. The family lived in an encampment of huts, without power or running water, outside Model Town in Lahore.

"Baba" Bedi spent about fifteen months in an internment camp at Deoli in the early stages of World War Two because as a communist he was seeking to disrupt recruitment of Punjabis into the British Indian army. Freda herself was jailed for three months in 1941 as a satyagrahi after deliberately defying the wartime regulations as part of a civil disobedience campaign spearheaded by Mohandas K. Gandhi After independence in 1947, Bedi and her family moved to Kashmir, where husband and wife were influential supporters of Sheikh Abdullah, the left-wing Kashmiri nationalist leader. She joined a women's militia for a while and taught English at a newly established women's college in Srinagar in Kashmir. Later in Delhi, she became editor of the magazine "Social Welfare" of the Ministry of Welfare and also received Indian citizenship.

Freda Bedi briefly served as a member of the United Nations Social Services Planning Commission to Burma, during which she was first exposed to Buddhism, which quickly became the defining aspect of her life. In Rangoon she learned vipassana from Mahasi Sayadaw, and Sayadaw U Titthila.

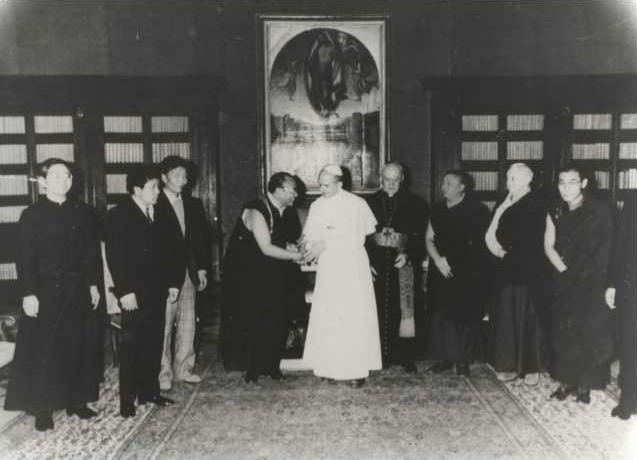
Rangjung Rigpe Dorje, 16th Karmapa with Pope Paul VI and Gelongma Karma Kechog Palmo (third from the right of the Pope) at the Vatican on 17 January 1975

In Delhi, she became a prominent Buddhist and in 1956, when the 14th Dalai Lama made his first visit to India, she showed him around Buddhist shrines in Delhi.

In 1959, when the Dalai Lama arrived in India after an arduous trek across the Himalayas followed by thousands of his Tibetan devotees, she was asked by India's prime minister Jawaharlal Nehru to help them and spent time improving facilities for refugees at camps in Assam and West Bengal. She became an observant Tibetan Buddhist and she followed the guidance of the 16th Karmapa of the Kagyu School. She worked, with the support of the Dalai Lama, to establish the Young Lamas Home School. Bedi initially set up the Young Lama's School in Delhi but after a short period it was moved to Dalhousie. The school trained young Tibetan lamas and monks in languages and social sciences as well as religion, to equip the coming generation of Tibetan spiritual leaders for life in exile. A number of Bedi's pupils became well-known teachers, including Chogyam Trungpa, Thubten Zopa Rinpoche, Akong Rinpoche, Tulku Pema Tenzin, Kathak Tulku, Gelek Rimpoche, Lama Yeshe Losal Rinpoche, and the sons of Tulku Urgyen Rinpoche, Chokyi Nyima and Chokling of Tsikey). In 1963, with Lama Karma Thinley Rinpoche and under the guidance of the Karmapa, she founded the Karma Drubgyu Thargay Ling nunnery for Tibetan women, now located in Tilokpur, Kangra Valley.

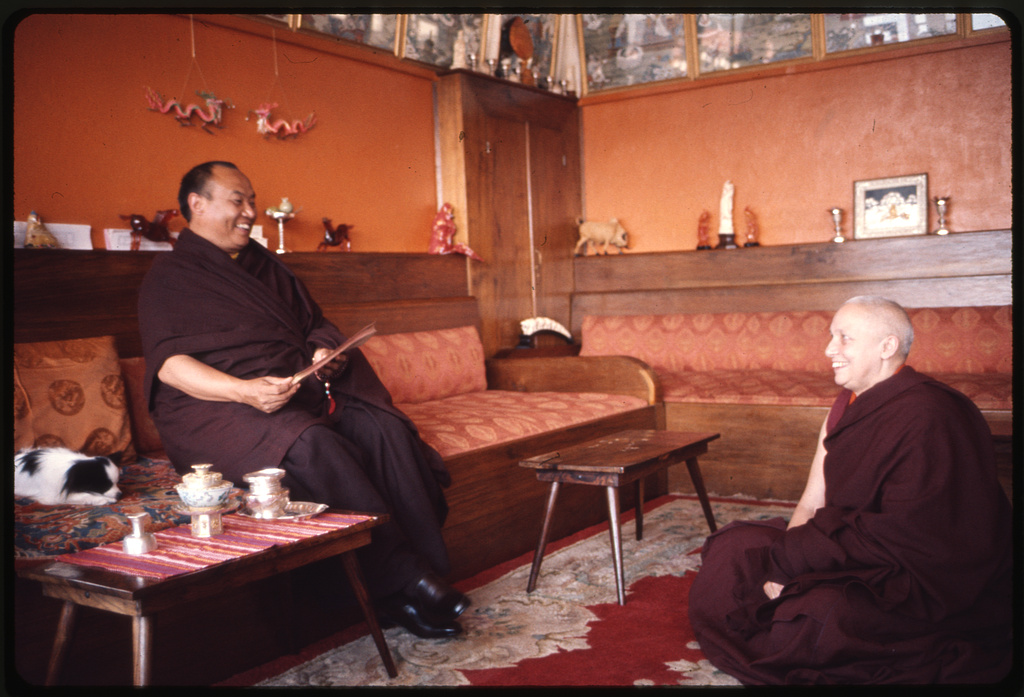
Rangjung Rigpe Dorje, the 16th Karmapa with Gelongma Karma Kechog Palmo (Freda Bedi) at Rumtek Monastery, Sikkim in 1971

While running the Young Lamas Home School at Dalhousie in north India, Bedi also spent time at Rumtek in Sikkim, the seat of the Karmapa in exile. In 1966, she took sramaneri ordination by the Karmapa and was given the name Karma Kechog Palmo. She was one of the first Western women to take ordination in Tibetan Buddhism. In 1972, she took full bhikshuni ordination in Hong Kong - the first western woman to do so, and according to the scholar Hanna Havnevik possibly the first woman in the Tibetan tradition ever to receive this higher ordination. She accompanied the Karmapa on his first visit to the West in 1974, a landmark five-month tour across North America and Europe. Although not fluent in Tibetan, she helped to translate prayers and religious texts into English. She is credited for bringing Tibetan Buddhism to the West.

Bedi died in New Delhi on 26 March 1977. She was survived by two sons, Ranga Bedi, who was a tea planter, and Kabir Bedi, a Hollywood and Bollywood film and TV star, who was born in Lahore in 1946; a daughter, Gulhima, who was born in Srinagar in 1949, now lives in the United States. A hand crafted wooden tribute to Freda Bedi, made by Kalwinder Singh Dhindsa, was placed in a community garden in her home city of Derby in June 2022.

== Published works ==
- Freda Marie Houlston Bedi, Baba Pyare Lal Bedi, (editors) India analysed, three volumes published by Victor Gollancz, 1933-4
- Freda Marie Houlston Bedi, Behind the Mud Walls, Lahore: Unity Publishers, 1943
- Freda Bedi, Bengal Lamenting, Lahore: Lion, 1944
- Baba Pyare Lal Bedi, Freda Marie (Houlston) Bedi, Sheikh Abdullah: his life and ideals, pamphlet, c1949
- Ein Rosenkranz von Morgengebeten : nach der Tradition des Mahayana – Buddhismus / aus dem Tibetischen ins Englische übers. von Karma Khechog Palmo. Deutsche Wiedergabe von Advayavajra. – Almora, Indien : Kasar-Devi-Ashram-Publication, 1971. – VI, 49 S.
- Freda Bedi, Anna Bhushan (illustrator), Rhymes for Ranga, Random House, India, 2010, ISBN 81-8400-036-7

=== Translations ===
==== From French ====
- Voltaire, Fragments on India, Lion Press, 1937

==== From Tibetan ====
- A Garland of morning prayers in the tradition of Mahayana Buddhism, Gelongma Karma Tsultim Khechog Palmo, Ed Palmo, 1976
- Wangchuk Dorje (Karmapa IX), Zhar dMar dKon mChog Yan Lag, Mahamudra meditation or The Mahamudra, Gelongma Karma Tsultim Khechog Palmo, Ed. Karma Rigdol Publications, 1971
