= Denma Locho Rinpoche =

Tibetan lama of Drepung Monastery

Khensur Denma Locho Rinpoche (1928 Kham, Tibet - 23 October 2014, MacLeod Ganj, Dharamsala, India) also known as Lobsang Oser Choying Gyatso, was a Tibetan incarnate lama, or tulku, of the Loseling College of Drepung Monastery. An expert on Yamantaka and Vajrayogini, he is considered an incomparable luminary of Je Tsongkhapa's lineage, is renowned as a holder of the Tantric lineages, a master of the Tantric yogas, and the lineage holder of Ling Rinpoche.

Born in 1928 in Gaba, Kham, the eastern region of Tibet, from the Rongpo clan, where he was recognized at age six as the reincarnation of a famous lama, Choying Gyatso aka Gen Locho, from the local Selkar Monastery and of Drepung Loseling. At age twelve, at the insistence of Tongpun Rinpoche, Denma Locho Rinpoche entered Drepung Loseling Monastic College outside Lhasa and studied with Tongpun Rinpoche until he departed for China a few years later. Thereafter, he was tutored by Gen Nyima Gyaltsen. He obtained his Lharampa Geshe degree, equivalent to a PhD, and was first in his class. He then completed his tantric exams at Gyume Tantric College in 1958.

His education complete, Rinpoche decided to spend the rest of his life in contemplative retreat and sought the advice and permission of the Nechung, Gadong, and Tenma Oracles, all of whom assented to his request but in 1959, shortly after the Chinese communist army attacked Lhasa, he followed the Dalai Lama into exile in India. Rinpoche lived in Sarnath for two years, then became a research fellow at Calcutta University for two years, and then principal of the Buddhist School of Dialectics in Ladakh for six years. In 1967 he became abbot of a small monastery in Manali before moving to McLeod Ganj. Rinpoche was abbot of the Dalai Lama's Namgyal Monastery from 1986 to 1991.

Rinpoche first came to the United States in 1978, where he taught for one year at the University of Virginia in Charlottesville. He taught at Jewel Heart in the United States and the Netherlands several times, at Drepung Loseling Monastery USA, Ladakh and the monasteries of South India.

Locho Rinpoche received many teachings from the late Venerable Ling Rinpoche, the senior tutor to the Dalai Lama, and became the main lineage holder of his teachings. When the Dalai Lama's senior tutor Kyabje Ling Dorjechang passed away and his young reincarnation, the 7th Kyabjé Yongzin Ling Rinpoche was discovered, the Dalai Lama appointed Rinpoche as his tutor.

Rinpoche's principal gurus were Lithang Kyabgon (Shogdrung Rinpoche) and Lhatsung Dorje Chang, "the two masters from whom Rinpoche received the unique lineages of Manjushri/Yamantaka and Vajrayogini that came to define him;" Yongzin Ling Rinpoche; Trijang Dorje Chang; and the Fourteenth Dalai Lama. He passed on all the lineages of empowerment, transmission and instruction, which he had received in Tibet, at various locations in India and Nepal. He was teacher of Kyabje Gelek Rimpoche and Lama Zopa Rinpoche.

His body was cremated at Gyuto Monastery on November 3, 2014. The head lamas present for the many services held in his honor were the Gaden Tripa, Rizong Rinpoche; Gyuto Abbot Emeritus, Tongpun Rinpoche; and Gyuto Khen Rinpoche, Jhado Rinpoche.

== Bibliography ==
- Meditative States in Tibetan Buddhism, with Lati Rinpoche, Leah Zahler and Jeffrey Hopkins, Wisdom Publications: 2nd edition, June 15, 1983; ISBN 9780861711192,ASIN 086171119X
- THE WHEEL OF EXISTENCE: The Twelve Links of Dependent existence; Denma Locho Rinpoche: Teachings in the Netherlands, 1987
