= Anandabodhi =

Anandabodhi or Ananda Bodhi may refer to:

- Ananda Bodhi Tree, an offshoot of the Bodhi Tree under which Gautama Buddha is said to have attained enlightenment
- Namgyal Rinpoche, ordained as Anandabodhi bhikkhu in 1958
