= Namgyal Rinpoche =

Canadian-born Tibetan Buddhist lama

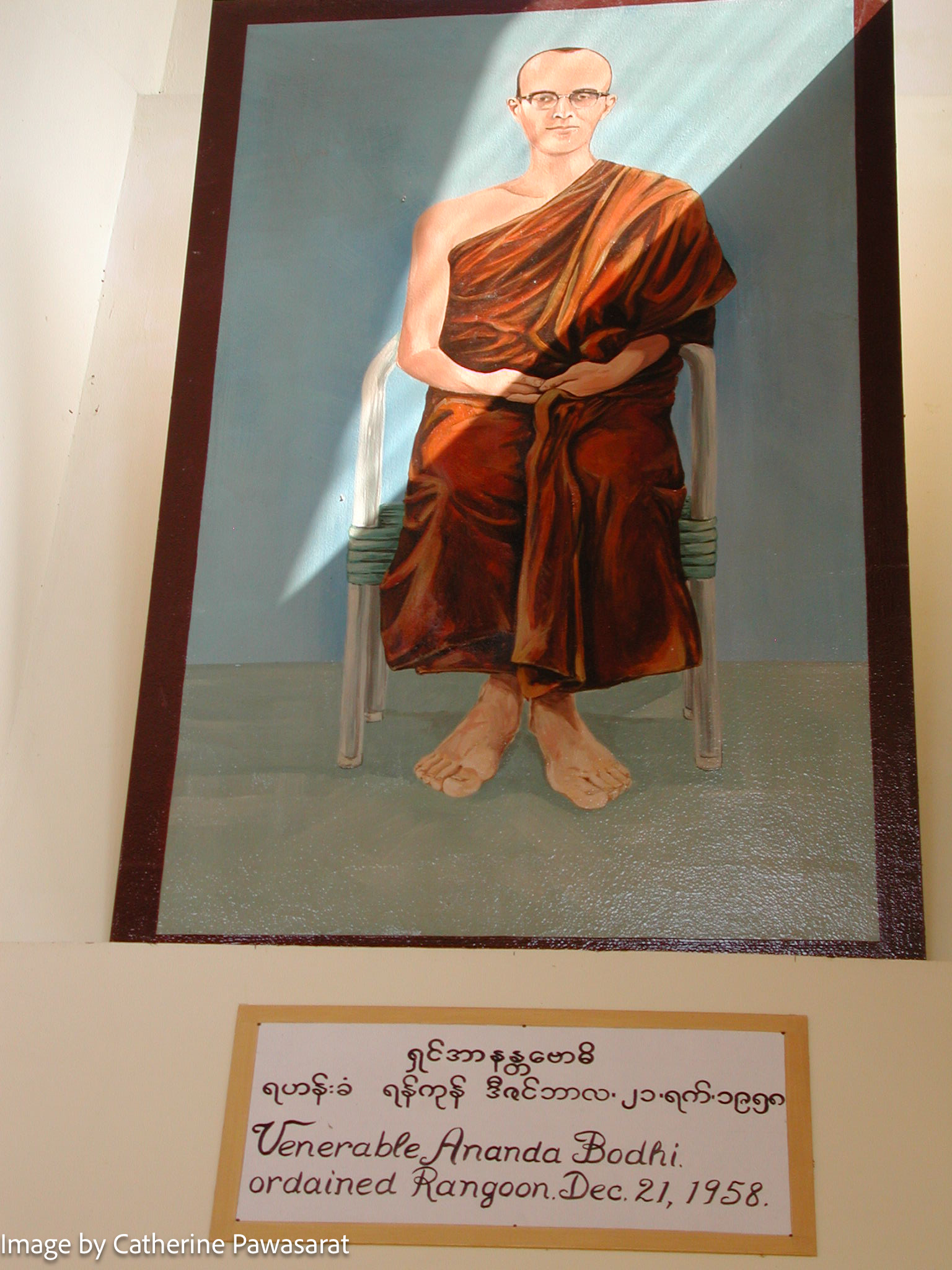
A photo of the mural depicting Ananda Bodhi, who was later recognized as Namgyal Rinpoche, in the Maitreya Hall at Sayadaw U Thila Wunta's Dat Pon Zon Aung Min Gaung Monastery in Yangon. Photo by Catherine Pawasarat, mural painting by Victoria Oginski.

Namgyal Rinpoche, Karma Tenzin Dorje (1931–2003), born Leslie George Dawson in Toronto, Canada, was a Buddhist monk (bhikkhu) ordained in Burma who later became a lama in the Tibetan Kagyu school of Vajrayana Buddhism.

== Early life ==
Namgyal Rinpoche was born Leslie George Dawson in 1931, October 11, and raised in Toronto, Canada by parents of Irish and Scottish descent and attended Jarvis Baptist Seminary, before going on to the University of Michigan in Ann Arbor, USA, where he studied philosophy and psychology and became active in Socialist politics. After visiting Moscow to address an international youth conference, he became disillusioned with politics, and moved to London in 1954.

== Theravāda studies in Asia ==
While in London he studied Buddhism and in 1956 met the Sayadaw U Thila Wunta, a Burmese monk who accepted Leslie Dawson as a student. That same year he traveled to Bodh Gaya, India to rejoin the Sayadaw and received ordination as a sāmaṇera (novice monk). He continued on to Burma where he was ordained as Ananda Bodhi bhikkhu at the Shwedagon Pagoda in Yangon in 1958. He began intensive training and meditation practice under the guidance of U Thila Wunta and Mahasi Sayadaw, then in Thailand with Chao Khun Phra Rajasiddhimuni at Wat Mahadhatu in Bangkok. In Sri Lanka he studied the Pāli Canon, the Visuddhimagga, and other classical texts before receiving the title acharya (teacher of Dharma).

== Return to the United Kingdom and Canada ==
In 1962, Ananda Bodhi returned to England at the invitation of the English Sangha Trust. He was a special guest speaker at the Fifth International Congress of Psychotherapists in London where he met Julian Huxley, Anna Freud and R.D. Laing, among others. In 1964, he came into contact with Tibetan Buddhism, "was instantly and deeply impressed." In 1965, he founded the Johnstone House Contemplative Community, a retreat center near Dumfries in Scotland. A year earlier he had met Chögyam Trungpa Rinpoche and Akong Tulku, Tibetan lamas at Oxford. Chögyam Trungpa and Akong Tulku had been sent by the 16th Karmapa to study and live in the West.

Ananda Bodhi donated his Theravāda center Johnstone House to Chögyam Trungpa Rinpoche and Akong Tulku, which Chögyam Trungpa named Samye Ling, one of the first Buddhist centers in the West. With his donation of the house that would become Samye Ling, Namgyal Rinpoche played a "timely role in the spread of Tibetan Buddhist teachings in Europe." In 1965, Ananda Bodhi returned to Canada with two of his senior students, Tony Olbrecht and Barry Goulden, where he established a new community, The Dharma Centre of Canada in 1966 (incorporated as a charity 1972), and founded the Centennial Lodge of the Theosophical Society (1967). Over the years that followed, Namgyal Rinpoche began to stress the study of Western psychology and philosophy, exercise, diet, and the appreciation of fine art and music as a supplement to traditional Buddhist training, and began taking students with him on voyages to various countries around the world, often on cargo ships.

== As Namgyal Rinpoche ==
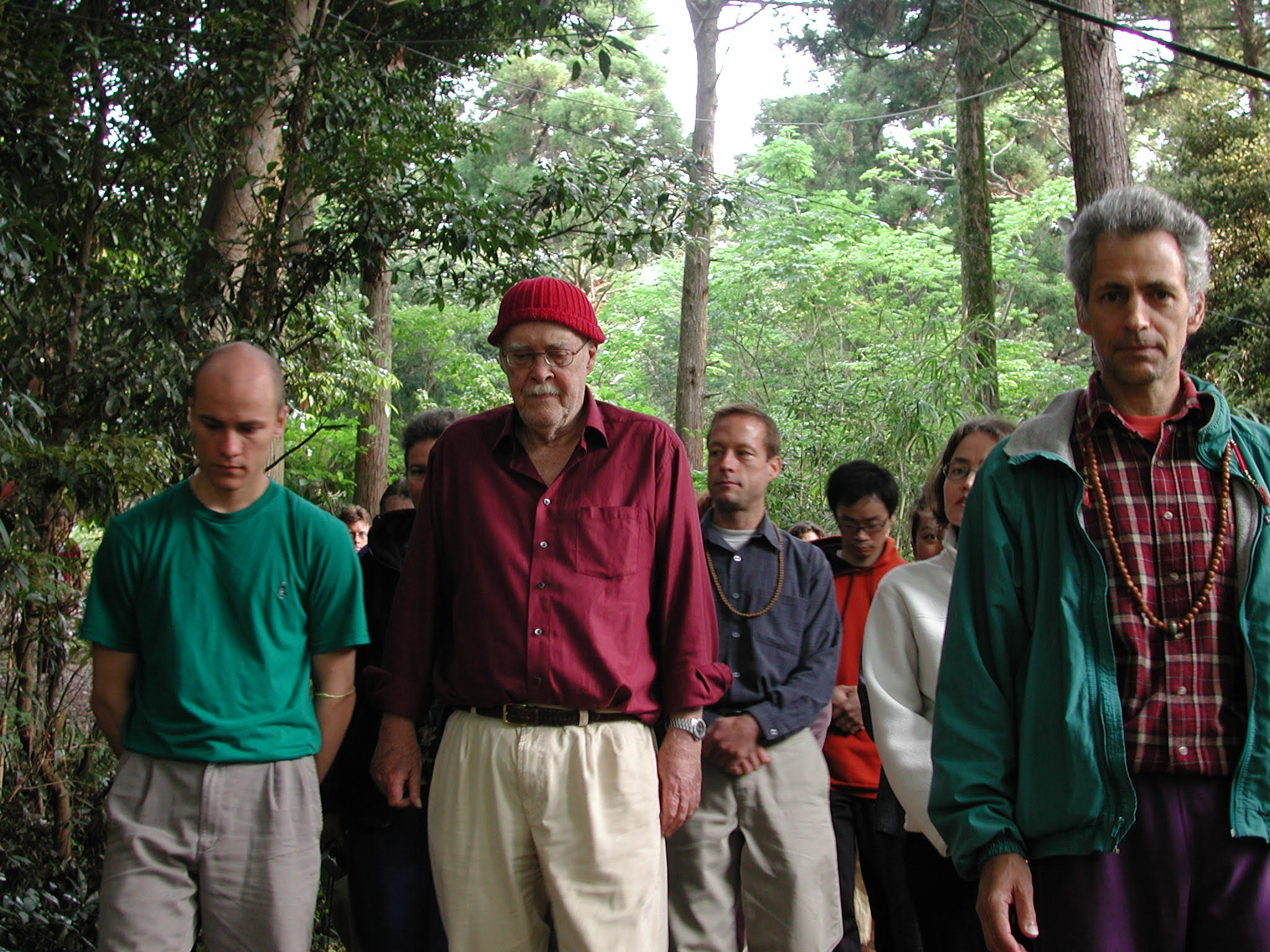
Namgyal Rinpoche with students at a retreat in May, 2003, at Iriai Mura, Izu Peninsula, Japan. Photo by Catherine Pawasarat.

Namgyal Rinpoche is known as the first Western Rinpoche.

During a pilgrimage with students to India and Sikkim in 1968, Ananda Bodhi was recognized by the 16th Karmapa, the supreme head of the Karma Kagyu school of Tibetan Buddhism, as an accomplished master and received Vajrayana robes. One source offers that "he was immediately ushered into the presence of His Holiness [the 16th Karmapa], who greeted the Venerable Ananda Bodhi as an old friend and seated the bhiksu beside himself."

In 1971, Ananda Bodhi led a large group of students to India where they had audiences with Sakya Trizin at Dehra Dun and the Dalai Lama at Dharamshala. He took a group of about one hundred students to Rumtek; at Rumtek Monastery in Sikkim they received empowerments by the 16th Karmapa. It was on this visit that the 16th Karmapa gave Ananda Bodhi his Tibetan name in Rumtek through full ordination as Karma Tenzin Dorje Namgyal. After this full Gelong or monastic ordination, he became known as Namgyal Rinpoche. He was enthroned later that year at Green River, Ontario, by Karma Thinley Rinpoche, as instructed by the Karmapa.

The following year of 1972 Namgyal Rinpoche led another large group of students to Morocco for a four-month retreat, then back to India for an extended audience with Sakya Trizin of the Sakya Order. He once again visited the 16th Karmapa in Rumtek that year. Thereafter, Namgyal Rinpoche practised and taught in the Vajrayana tradition of Tibetan Buddhism as well as Theravadin and Mahayana schools. He was empowered and recognised by many teachers such as Sakya Trizin and Chogye Rinpoche of the Sakyas, Dudjom Rinpoche of the Nyingma sect, and various Kagyu lamas including Kalu Rinpoche, one of the Karmapa's main teachers. In subsequent years Namgyal Rinpoche inspired the establishment of Dharma centers around the world.

Namgyal Rinpoche's center, the Dharma Center of Canada, offered the 16th Karmapa his first invitation to the West, to visit Canada. Namgyal Rinpoche's invitation catalyzed the Karmapa's first world tour. The Karmapa was one of the first Tibetan spiritual leaders to visit North America, traveling to the West five years prior to the 14th Dalai Lama. Namgyal Rinpoche was one of the 16th Karmapa's first Western students, along with Hannah and Lama Ole Nydahl. Namgyal Rinpoche brought many people in Canada to Vajrayana teachings, and his Dharma Center of Canada includes the practice of other Buddhist traditions as well.

Namgyal Rinpoche continued to teach until his death in Switzerland on October 22, 2003.

== See also ==
- Samye Ling

== Publications ==
- Rinpoche, Namgyal (2024), Kwiat, Cecilie (ed.), Body, Speech & Mind: a manual for human development, Bodhi Publishing, ASIN B0CXBGPWH6
- Rinpoche, Namgyal (2024), Senge, Sonam (ed.), The Path of Victory: Discourses on the Paramita, Bodhi Publishing, ASIN B0D3S8LVGG
- Rinpoche, Namgyal (2024), Wongmo, Karma Chime (ed.), The Breath of Awakening: A Guide to Liberation Through Ānāpānasati Mindfulness of Breathing, Bodhi Publishing, ASIN B0CRVJFNZB
- Rinpoche, Namgyal (2004), Kwiat, Cecilie (ed.), Body, Speech & Mind: a manual for human development, Bodhi Publishing, ISBN 978-1-895316-06-3
- Rinpoche, Namgyal (2008), Right Livelihood and Other Foundations of Enlightenment, Bodhi Publishing, ISBN 9781895316094
- Rinpoche, Namgyal (1979), Wongmo, Karma Chime (ed.), The song of awakening: a guide to liberation through marananussati mindfulness of death, Open Path, ISBN 978-0-9602722-0-4
- Rinpoche, Namgyal (1982), Wongmo, Karma Chime (ed.), Unfolding through art, Open Path, ISBN 978-0-9602722-2-8
- Rinpoche, Namgyal (1996), Wongmo, Karma Chime (ed.), The womb, karma, and transcendence : a journey towards liberation, Bodhi Publishing, ISBN 1-895316-01-4

== Works about ==
- "A Time To Remember", Lama Sonam Gyatso, unpublished biography, 2003.
- Rinpoche, Namgyal; Wilkie, Rab; Berry, David (2012), Tales of awakening : travels, teachings and transcendence with Namgyal Rinpoche (1931-2003), Fairhaven Lantern Media, ISBN 978-1-4563-2273-1
- Namgyal Rinpoche in New Zealand, a short history of the contributions of Namgyal Rinpoche and his students to bringing the Buddha Dharma to New Zealand, by Tarchin Hearn.
- Biographies: The Venerable Kyabje Namgyal Rinpoche at the Dharma Fellowship of the Gyalwa Karmapa
