= Kagyu Samye Ling Monastery and Tibetan Centre =

Buddhist complex in Scotland

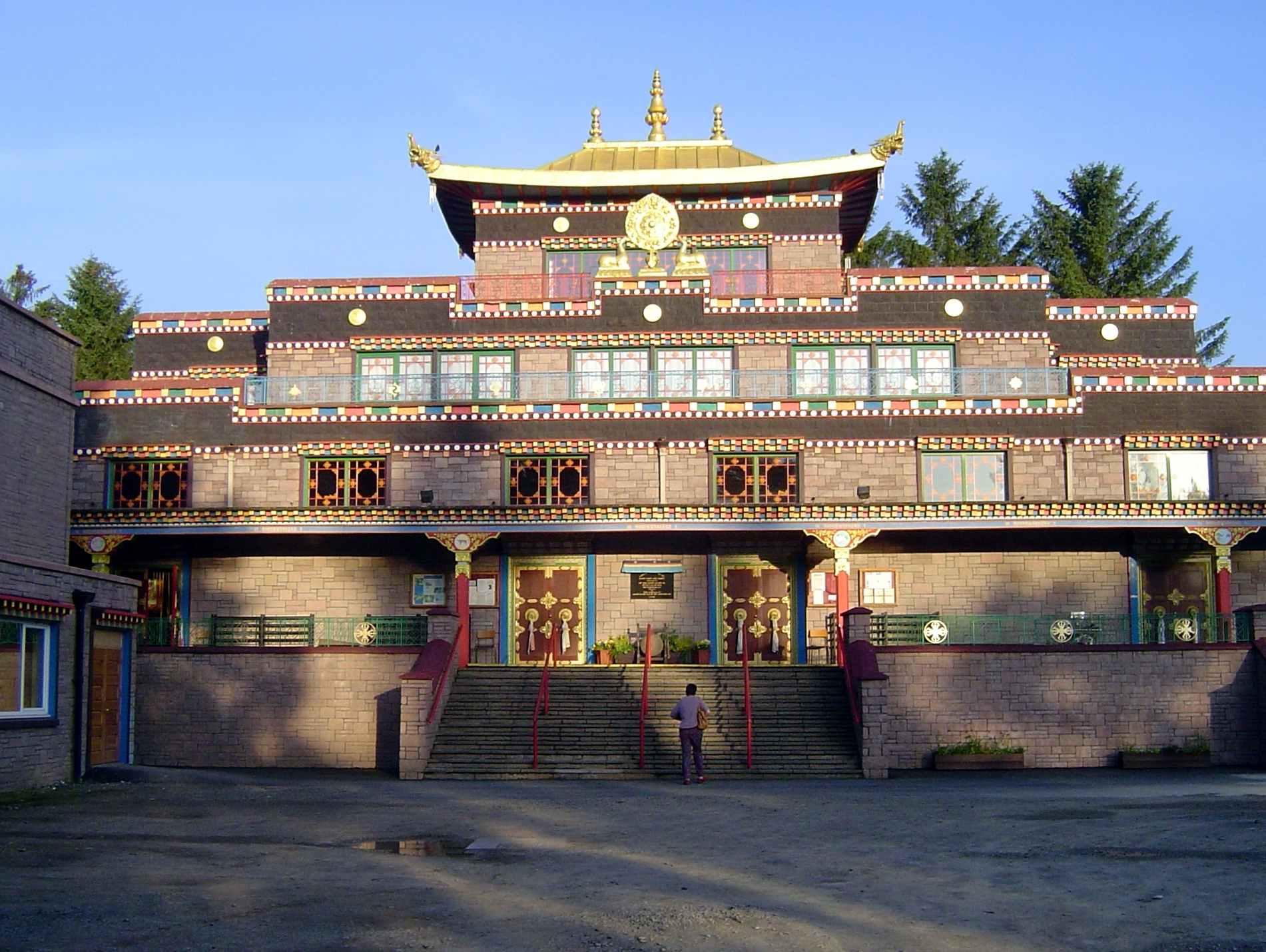
- The main temple building at Samye Ling

- Kagyu Samye Ling shown within Dumfries & Galloway

Religion
- Affiliation: Tibetan Buddhism
- Sect: Karma Kagyu
- Leadership: Lama Yeshe Losal Rinpoche

Location
- Location: Eskdalemuir, Dumfries and Galloway, Scotland
- Coordinates: 55°17′15″N 03°11′11″W

Architecture
- Founder: Akong Rinpoche and Chögyam Trungpa Rinpoche
- Established: 1967

Kagyu Samye Ling Monastery and Tibetan Centre is a Tibetan Buddhist complex at Eskdalemuir, Scotland. It is associated with the Karma Kagyu school.

The centre includes one of the first Tibetan temples to be constructed in Western Europe, a large stupa, and accommodation for those taking a range of courses on Buddhism, meditation, spiritual development and art.

== Rokpa Trust ==
Samye Ling is owned and run by Rokpa Trust, a charity registered in Scotland (SC038628) and incorporated as a company limited by guarantee in England and Wales (03260031). Rokpa Trust operates the Holy Isle Centre for World Peace and Health and the Samye Dzong centres. The charity's website, samyeling.org, carries the Samye Ling name, is published by Rokpa Trust, and covers the charity's governance and its other centres.

The Johnstone House Trust ceased to exist in 1995 and the centre now describes itself as part of the ROKPA Trust, whose objectives are

to promote Buddhism and to foster non-sectarian inter-religious dialogue and understanding. To provide medical care and therapy. To provide education. To relieve poverty.

Under Rokpa Trust's Articles of Association, trustees are appointed by spiritual leaders of the Karma Kagyu order.

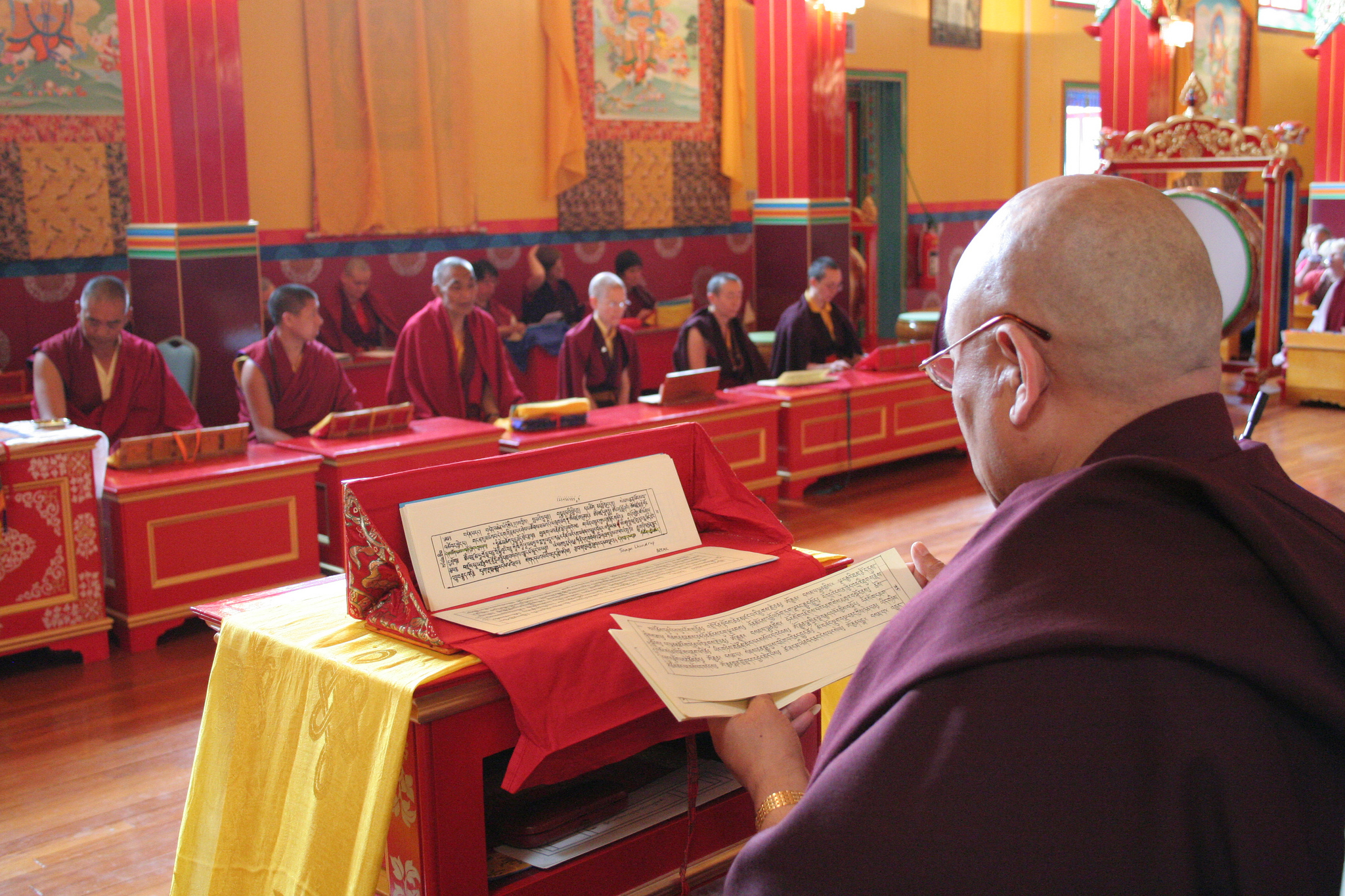
Samye Ling Temple with Sangha and Abbot Lama Yeshe Losal Rinpoche leading prayers.

The ROKPA trust administers a number of other centres and projects worldwide, notably the Holy Island Project which has retreat facilities on Holy Island on the Firth of Clyde and its Overseas Projects on behalf of ROKPA International based in Switzerland.

A ROKPA International project based at Samye Ling to raise funds for the girls school at Kandze Monastery was successful in reaching its target of £9,449. As at 2010 the trust was actively involved in relief efforts following the Yushu earthquake.

== History ==
Before the present temple complex was built, Samye Ling centred on just one building, a former hunting lodge called Johnstone House. In 1965 the Johnstone House Trust was formed with the objectives

to make available to the public facilities for study and meditation based on Buddhist and other religious teaching leading to mental and spiritual well-being: and to provide guidance for those in need of such help: and in particular the utilisation of the property known as Johnstone House, Eskdalemuir, for such purposes.

Initially the community was led there by a Canadian Theravada monk named Anandabodhi. When the community declined, Anandabodhi returned to Canada; he was subsequently ordained in the Tibetan Vajrayana tradition and enthroned as Namgyal Rinpoche by the 16th Gyalwa Karmapa.

In 1967 the Johnstone House trustees invited the Tibetan lamas and refugees Chögyam Trungpa Rinpoche and Akong Rinpoche to take over. They named the new community "Samye Ling", and were shortly joined by the thangka master-artist Sherab Palden Beru and the monk Samten. Samye refers to the first Buddhist monastic university in Tibet, while Ling means 'Place'.

Trungpa Rinpoche quickly came into conflict with both Akong Rinpoche and the trustees. He drank heavily and slept with his students. He married one of these, a fifteen-year-old girl at the time the relationship began, attracting press attention. In 1970 he left for America to form other centres there.

== Trungpa's son at Samye Ling, 1970–1972 ==
At the age of seven, Chögyam Trungpa's son Ösel Rangdröl Mukpo, later known as Sakyong Mipham, came to live at Samye Ling, and remained there in the care of Akong Rinpoche when his father moved to North America in 1970. In her memoir, the boy's stepmother Diana Mukpo writes that Akong then travelled to India and left him with Christopher and Pamela Woodman, a couple living near the centre, and that when she came to collect him they refused to give him up. British social services took the boy into care and placed him at the Pestalozzi Children's Village in East Sussex until he was released to his father in the United States in 1972.

In October 1971 a 23-year-old student from London, Brian McNichol, was found dead at the centre; Dumfries police investigated and reported to the Procurator Fiscal.

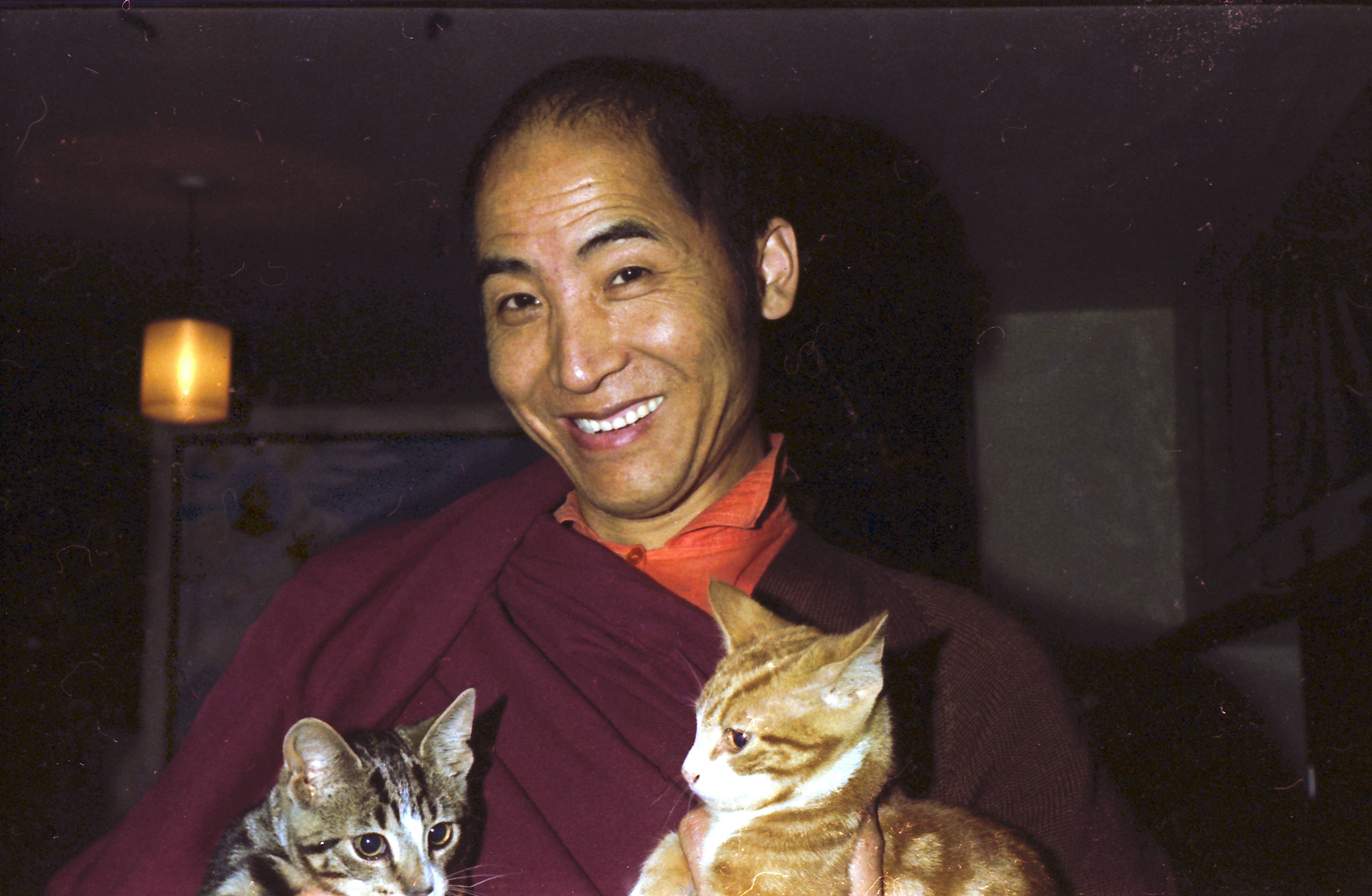
The monk Samten about 1978.

For about the decade 1970 onwards Samten, Beru, and Akong Rinpoche together were the main resident Tibetans at the centre. They were joined during 1976 and 1977 by the Mani-pa Lama bLa mChog. During this seminal period of the 1970s, Samye Ling was the main and oldest Tibetan centre in Europe. As such, it received important visits from eminent teachers of many traditions, including first the Kalu Rinpoche (1973 and thereafter), the 16th Gyalwa Karmapa (Nov. 1975 and 12.12.-26.12.1977), Khamtrul Rinpoche, Dilgo Khyense Rinpoche and Urgyen Tulku.

In 1969 the musicians David Bowie and Leonard Cohen were students at Samye Ling. Bowie almost became a monk there:

"I was a terribly earnest Buddhist at the time [...] I had stayed in their monastery and was going through all their exams, and yet I had this feeling that it wasn't right for me. I suddenly realised how close it all was: another month and my head would have been shaved."

The centre flourished and developed under the guidance of Akong Rinpoche and his brother Lama Yeshe Losal Rinpoche, who serves as both Abbot and Retreat Master.

Samye Ling was the subject of an ITV First Tuesday documentary broadcast on 5 November 1985, at which time the community numbered about 100 and had spent £100,000 on the new temple building.

== Crematorium proposal, 1988 ==
In March 1988 the centre applied to Dumfries and Galloway Council for a private crematorium. Akong Rinpoche proposed to build it in Eskdalemuir, which would have been the first private crematorium in Britain. Residents of the valley first learned of the plan from a paragraph in a local newspaper. Within days a petition against it had been signed by 90 per cent of the valley's residents, and offers of help to oppose the scheme were received from elsewhere in Scotland.

Akong Rinpoche called a public meeting at the village hall, which The Independent reported was "packed to the walls". At the meeting he was questioned on the community's future plans, and the likely number of Buddhist deaths each year was debated; his own estimate was two or three. He also denied what the newspaper described as "long-standing rumours that he ran a lodging house in Dumfries". One resident said afterwards: "Aye, I enjoyed it ... There were 21 years of grievance coming out." The newspaper reported that "the following morning the abbot withdrew his crematorium plans".

Local objections at the time also concerned the scale of the new temple. Angus Hoggart, a farm worker and chairman of the community council, said: "I think if people had known how big it was going to be, there would have been more said at the very beginning." Akong Rinpoche said of the community's activities: "The whole purpose is to benefit people ... If we make unhappiness or suffering, there is no point."

== Finance ==
In 2008 the total declared income of the ROKPA trust was £2,916,136. The total funds received for Overseas Projects was £294,586 of which £260,361 was disbursed to ROKPA International.

== Preservation of Tibetan art and crafts ==
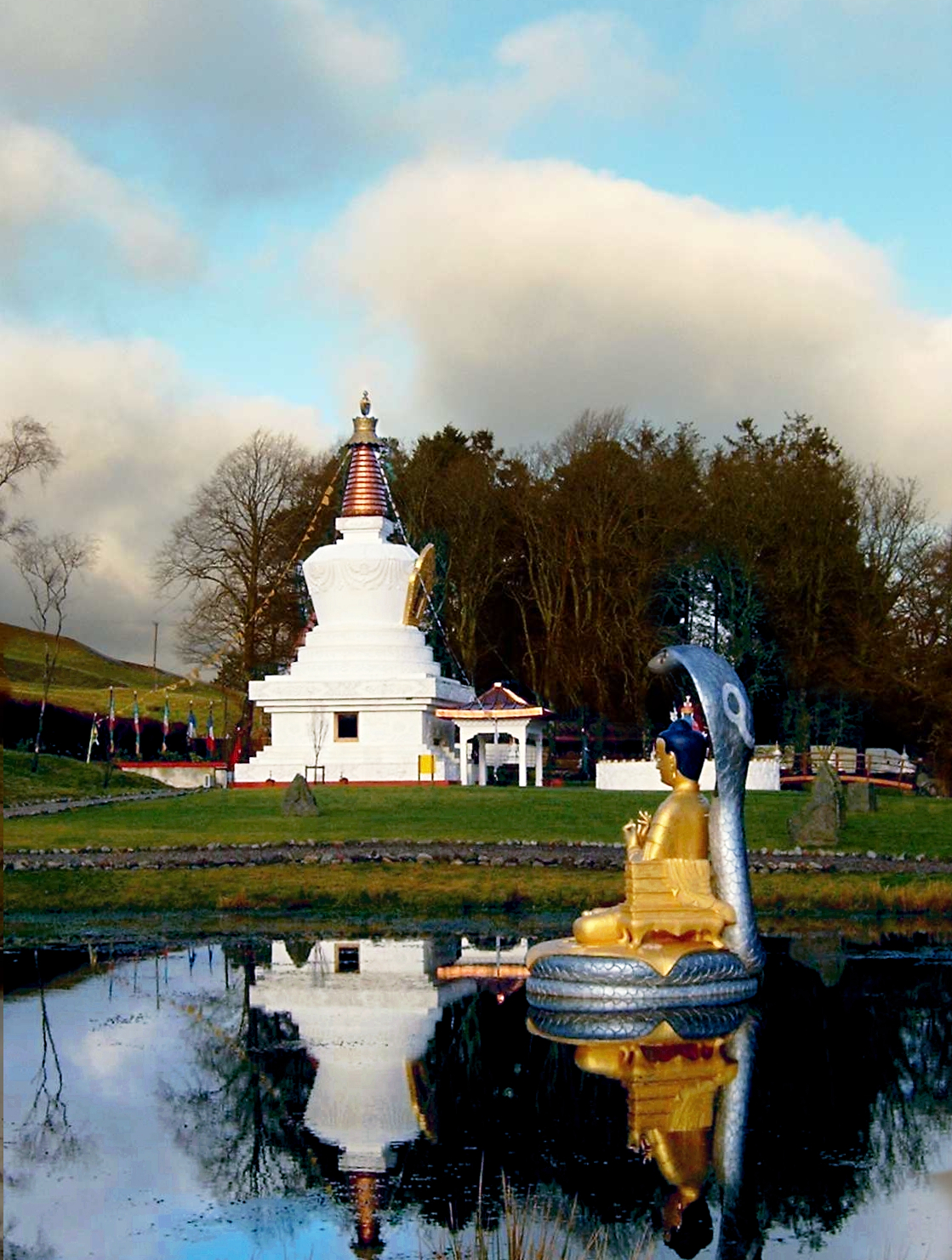
The first authentic Scottish stupa and statue of Nagarjuna in the grounds of Samye Ling

Under the guidance of the Tibetan artist Sherab Palden Beru, Samye Ling has also become a centre for the creation, repair and restoration of thangkas, principally in the Karma Gadri style. Since the 1970s Sherab has trained a number of western practitioners in the highly specialised techniques needed to create thangkas. The temple walls are decorated with many examples of the work of both Sherab Palden Beru and his western pupils.

The trust is planning a further expansion of its Samye Ling temple project involving a major multimillion-pound extension which will eventually house a museum, a library, lecture theatres, offices and accommodation. Work began on this in early 2008. It lodged an amendment to the layout of this second phase with the Dumfries and Galloway Council on 18 June 2010.

Traditional deity and monumental sculpture and the creation of prayer-wheels are also carried out at the centre under the direction of resident and visiting Tibetan experts. The grounds of the centre feature many examples of their work, such as a statue of Nagarjuna. This latter statue was sculpted by Lama Thubten Kunsal from Tashi Gonsar Gong monastery in Derge, East Tibet.

== Murder ==
On 12 October 2013 the centre announced that Thubten Kunsal has been named by Chengdu police as one of three individuals suspected of the murders of Akong Rinpoche, co-founder of the centre, and two others in Chengdu, China, on 8 October 2013.

== Scottish sensibility ==
Listed as a tourist attraction by VisitScotland, the center attracts visitors who come to see the gilded temple, stupas and gardens with statues of Bodhisattvas and Buddhas.

In its early days, the attraction experienced disputes over planning applications and suspicion about behavior of residents and visitors. Following these events, the center and local communities developed a more supportive exchange. Local leaders such as the former MP and Liberal Party leader David Steel are warmly supportive of the center.

In a 2003 interview with the Sri Lanka Daily News, Lama Yeshe Losal Rinpoche said that the Scottish Tourist board had told him it was the tenth-most-visited place in Scotland:

"There seems to be something about Tibetan Buddhism which appeals to people in the West, where so many people are disillusioned with the stress and the lack of a spiritual aspect in their lives."

In 2010 Lama Yeshe Losal designed a Buddhist tartan whose colours represent the five elements in Tibetan cosmogeny:

"We are fortunate to be established as part of the Scottish community and wanted a tartan for our Sangha to show how much appreciation we have for the people, culture and tradition of Scotland".

== Allegations ==
In April 2000 the Daily Record published an investigation alleging sexual misconduct, drug use and benefit fraud at the centre. Police reported a senior monk to the Procurator Fiscal on two counts of indecent assault, and the centre introduced a complaints and disciplinary system.

In June 2000 Tenzin Chonjoe, a Tibetan who had stayed at Samye Ling, was sentenced at Carlisle Magistrates' Court to three months' imprisonment and placed on the sex offenders' register for indecently assaulting a 14-year-old girl in Carlisle.

In March 2001 the charges against the senior monk went to trial.

In September 2011 William Cunningham, a registered sex offender with 34 previous convictions who had failed to appear at Kilmarnock Sheriff Court in May that year, was traced to Holy Isle, where he had been living with the monks. He was jailed for two years and four months.

== Inquest into death of a Holy Isle retreatant ==
In April 2026 an inquest at Bournemouth Coroner's Court heard that Claire Rodway, 52, a former nurse from Christchurch, Dorset, had left the year-long Holy Isle retreat early in April 2025 after a back injury and later took her own life. The inquest heard she had said she deeply regretted going on the retreat. She joined a year-long retreat on Holy Isle in October 2024. She left the retreat in February 2025 with back pain, stayed elsewhere on the island until April, and was found dead in the River Avon on 2 October 2025. The inquest heard that the retreat involved daily prostrations, evenings in silence and teachings at 2am, and that she was diagnosed with fibromyalgia in July 2025. Lama Zangmo (Elise Jacobsen), a Rokpa Trust trustee from Samye Dzong London Centre, gave evidence that Rodway had been advised to do the prostrations kneeling, and that in 32 years 131 people had completed the retreat; she denied negligence. Counsel for the family, Ellen Robertson, said there had been "an utter lack of any policies in place" to keep participants safe and that "the way in which this organisation is operating is not safe". In July 2026 assistant coroner Richard Middleton recorded a conclusion of suicide. He said that trauma, prostrations and disturbed sleep could have worsened her fibromyalgia.

== Governance ==
Under Rokpa Trust's Articles of Association, trustees are appointed by spiritual leaders of the Karma Kagyu order. Ultimate control of the company and group lies with the trustees.

As at September 2026 the directors of Rokpa Trust, who are its trustees, were Lama Yeshe Losal Rinpoche and Ani Lhamo (both appointed 7 October 1996), Karma Lhamo Cosgrove and John Frederick Michael Maxwell (both 22 February 1997), Lama Elise Kristine Sylvest Jacobsen (1 July 2003), Tsultim Palbar Lama (1 April 2015) and Helen Mary Richardson (14 January 2026). The Trust's 2005 accounts identify Lama Yeshe Losal as chairman.

The resident community was reported at around 100 in 1988, including ten monks and nuns. Ani Lhamo, the Abbot's secretary, counted about fifty residents when the centre closed for lockdown in March 2020, fewer than half of them monks and nuns; in February 2025 she put the figure at about thirty. She told the Scottish COVID-19 Inquiry that charges for accommodation and food had been the centre's principal income, that this fell sharply in 2020, that savings were used, and that Brexit restrictions on volunteers and energy costs had affected the centre as much as the pandemic.

== Company Secretary and the Mindfulness Association ==
From December 2018 until 31 December 2025 the company secretary of Rokpa Trust was Sean McGovern, to whom the trustees delegated day-to-day management of the charity. Sean McGovern has been a director of Mindfulness Association Limited.

On 12 January 2026 the Abbot, Lama Yeshe Losal Rinpoche, announced that he had stood down as Patron of the Mindfulness Association, which, according to his statement, was established in 2010 with the involvement of Akong Rinpoche. He said the Association had cancelled all its courses and retreats at Samye Ling and Holy Isle on the basis of allegations against Rokpa Trust which he described as "false, unsubstantiated".

== See also ==
- Buddhism in Scotland
- List of monastic houses in Scotland
- Religion in Scotland
