= Lama Jampa Thaye =

British Lama

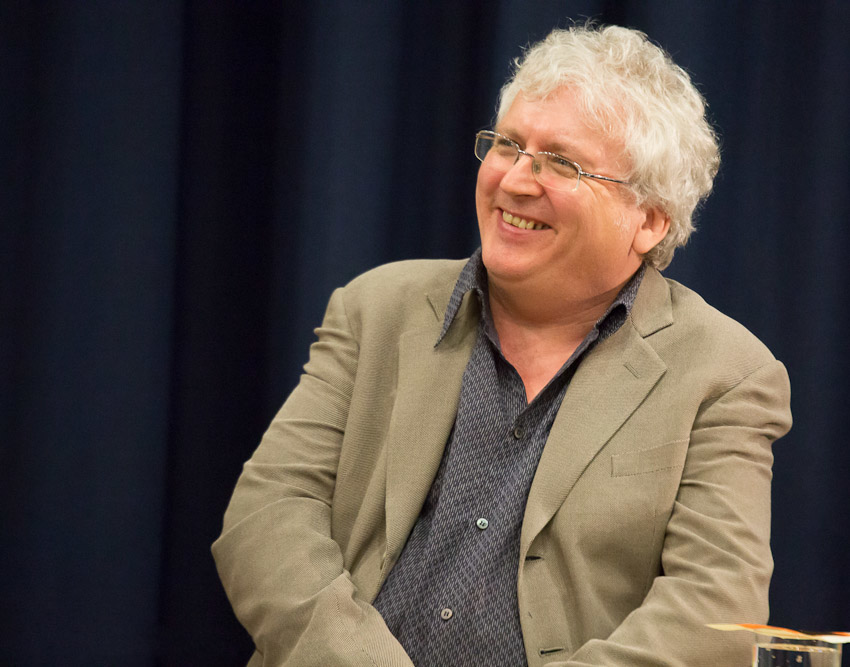
- Born: October 23, 1952 (age 73)
- Organization: Dechen Buddhism
- Title: Lama
- Website: lamajampa.org

Lama Jampa Thaye is a teacher of the Sakya and Karma Kagyu traditions of Tibetan Buddhism. He has been teaching for over 30 years and is the spiritual director of the Dechen organisation of Buddhist Centres. He is the author of several books on Tibetan Buddhism and has a PhD in Tibetan Religions from the University of Manchester. He is renowned for being one of the first Westerners who are authorised to transmit Vajrayana teachings.

== Biography ==
=== Early life and education ===
Thaye was born into a Catholic family in 1952 in Manchester, England and met his first spiritual teacher, Karma Thinley Rinpoche, at the age of 20 in 1973. Thaye's other principal masters include the 41st Sakya Trizin and the Karmapa (both the 16th and, Trinley Thaye Dorje, the 17th). Thaye is somewhat unusual in that he has received authority to give teachings from both the Sakya and Karma Kagyu traditions of Tibetan Buddhism, receiving authority to teach from both Karma Thinley Rinpoche and Sakya Trizin due to his contemplative and scholarly training. Thaye is married with four children.

=== Dechen ===
Thaye is spiritual director of a network of dharma centres, founded under the authority of Karma Thinley Rinpoche, which bear the name "Dechen" (Tibetan for 'Great Bliss'). As of December 2012, there were 21 Dechen Centres around the world, with the majority in the United Kingdom and others in the U.S., Mexico and continental Europe.

== Teaching ==
Thaye travels extensively giving teachings and initiations in many countries, both for Dechen and other Buddhist organizations. He is also a member of the international teaching faculty of the Karmapa International Buddhist Institute in Delhi. Sakya Trizin commented: "I would like to commend Lama Jampa Thaye for the unflagging enthusiasm and effort that he has devoted to the noble cause of making the dharma available to all those who have an interest in it, and encourage him to continue his good works." His books have been translated into French, German, Spanish, Portuguese, Bulgarian and Polish.

In 2008 he served as the UK participant in the fifth World Buddhist summit in Japan, the sixth summit in 2015 (Japan), and seventh summit in 2017 (Sri Lanka). From 2011 onwards, he has contributed articles to the online and print edition of Tricycle: The Buddhist Review, New York. Some of these articles have been translated and re-published in Sagesses Bouddhistes (France) and Buddhismus Aktuell (Germany).

In October 2019, Thaye served on the advisory committee for Buddhism Exhibition at British Library, London, and was the guest speaker at the Private View Reception for the exhibition.

Thaye's teaching approach follows the long-established and traditional style of Tibetan Buddhist masters down the ages. He stresses the established historical approach to Vajrayana practice so as to sustain the authentic, continuing transmission of its intellectual and experiential aspects.

== Publications ==
=== Books ===
- Diamond Sky, (Ganesha Press, 1989 ISBN 0950911917)
- Garland of Gold, (Ganesha Press, 1990 ISBN 0950911933)
- Way of Tibetan Buddhism, (Thorsons, 2001 ISBN 0722540175)
- River of Memory, (Ganesha Press, 2005 ISBN 0950911925)
- Rain of Clarity, (Ganesha Press, 2006 ISBN 0950911941)
- Wisdom in Exile: Buddhism and Modern Times, (Dechen Foundation, 2017 ISBN 0998750727)
- Patterns in Emptiness: Understanding Dependent Origination, (Rabsel Publications, 2019 ISBN 2360170139)
- River of Memory: Dharma Chronicles, (Rabsel Publications, 2021 ISBN 2360170430)

=== Articles and contributions ===
- Offering the Body, Religion (1989) 19, 221-226
- Buddhadharma and Contemporary Ethics, Religion (1992) 22, 171-182

=== Forewords ===
- The History of the Sixteen Karmapas of Tibet (Prajna Press, 1980 ISBN 1570626448)
- The History of the Sakya Tradition (Ganesha Press, 1980 ISBN 0950911909)
