= Young Lamas Home School =

School for Tibetan Monks

The Young Lamas Home School was a school established by the 14th Dalai Lama and Freda Bedi in 1960. Its funding was provided by Christopher Hills and its early abbot was Karma Thinley Rinpoche.

Freda Bedi asked Chogyam Trungpa to train young Tibetan monks, and then he became the spiritual advisor of them. In addition to Chogyam Trungpa, there were Thubten Zopa Rinpoche, Akong Rinpoche, Tulku Pema Tenzin, Katak Tulku, Gelek Rimpoche, Yeshe Losal, and the sons of Tulku Urgyen Rinpoche, Chokyi Nyima and Tsikey Chokling Rinpoche who attended the school. Freda Bedi was the principal of the school in Delhi which later moved to Dalhousie.

Tenzin Palmo and Robert Thurman were teachers there.
