= Yeshe Losal =

Tibetan-born Scottish Buddhist lama

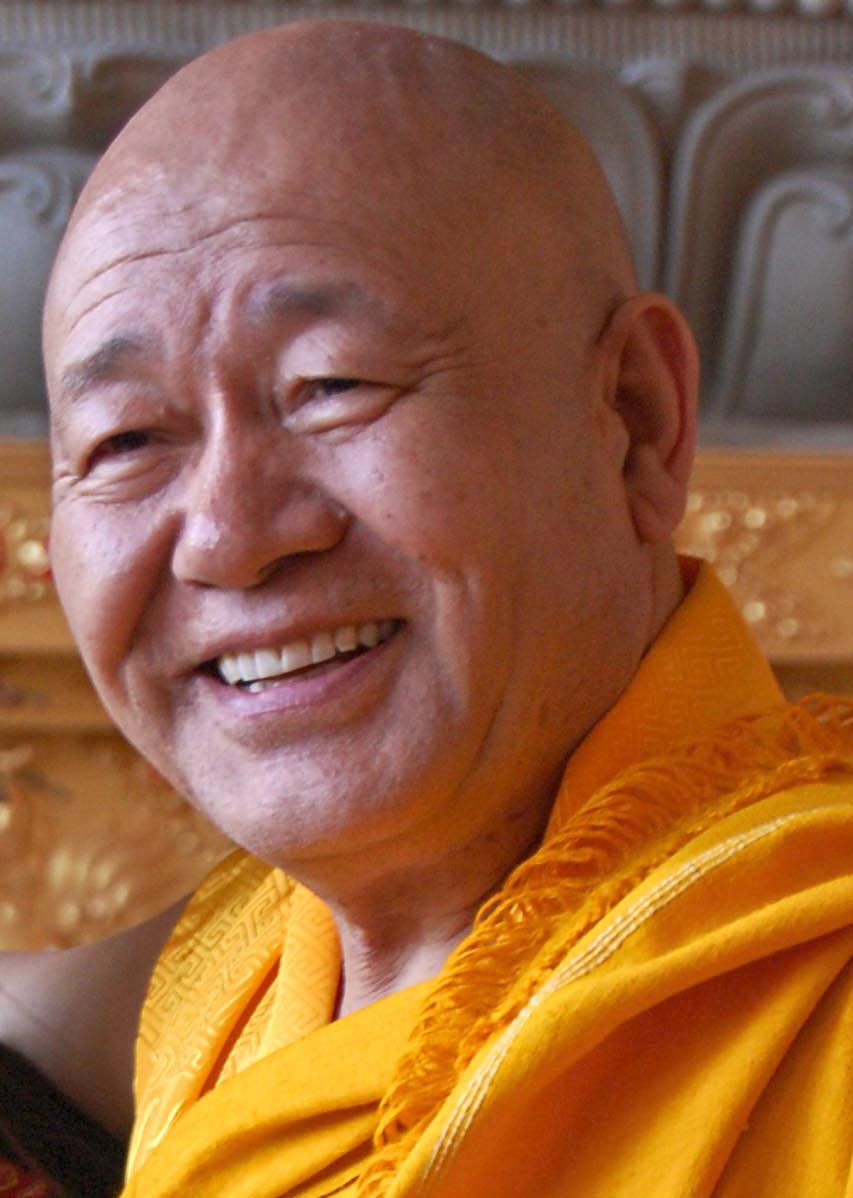
- Losal in 2010
- Title: Chairman of Rokpa Trust; Abbot and Retreat Master of Kagyu Samye Ling; Executive Director of The Holy Isle Project

Personal life
- Born: Jamphel Drakpa; 25 May 1943 (age 83) Kham, Tibet
- Occupation: Lama

Religious life
- Religion: Tibetan Buddhism
- School: Kagyu
- Lineage: Karma Kagyu

Senior posting
- Teacher: Rangjung Rigpe Dorje, 16th Karmapa
- Website: https://samyeling.org

Lama Yeshe Losal Rinpoche (Tibetan: ཡེ་ཤེས་བློ་གསལ་, Wylie: ye shes blo gsal) is a lama in the Kagyu school of Tibetan Buddhism and abbot of the Kagyu Samye Ling Monastery and Tibetan Centre, Scotland, the first and largest of its kind in the West.

== Early years ==
Born in 1943 into a farming family in Kham, East Tibet, he was given the name Jamphel Drakpa, or Jamdrak for short. He spent his early childhood close to nature helping with the family sheep and yaks and playing with the other children in the village; the children received no education as such. This changed when at 12 years old he was selected to go with his elder brother Choje Akong Rinpoche—who had been recognised as a tulku by the 16th Karmapa—to the Dolma Lhakang Monastery where he was to receive an education. Although Akong was only three years older than Jamdrak, it was the tradition that where a tulku is the abbot of a monastery one of his brothers goes to assist him. It is claimed that many auspicious signs had been seen when Jamdrak was born and he had also been recognised as a tulku, but not officially confirmed due to the political turbulence of the time. At Dolma Lhakang Jamdrak was a reluctant but diligent scholar under a succession of lamas, but his studies were interrupted by the Chinese invasion of Tibet in 1959.

== Escape to India ==
Jamdrak set off with his brother in a party of 300 to flee Tibet. As the Chinese occupied Lhasa the party was forced to take an alternative route which involved a perilous journey across the Himalaya mountains. The arduous journey involved high altitudes, raging rivers, evading capture and near starvation. Of the three hundred that set off only thirteen, including Jamdrak and his brother Akong Rinpoche arrived safely in India. The others were killed, captured or died of starvation.

Even in India the refugees were not safe. Another of Jamdrak's elder brothers died of tuberculosis, and he suffered from smallpox and tuberculosis himself. He survived but only after major surgery involving the removal of one of his lungs.

He continued his education at the Young Lamas Home School in Dalhousie, where he was groomed for a well paid post as an administrator of a large Tibetan settlement in India.

He did indeed briefly take up this post before leaving in 1967 to serve as private secretary to the 16th Karmapa at Rumtek Monastery in Sikkim. Although still a layperson he had a privileged position receiving teachings from high lamas.

== Rebellious youth ==
He later described himself during his time in India as "selfish and full of pride", and later "surly and miserable". He developed a love of cars—never having seen one until he was 15—and survived a series of crashes.

Meeting young American Peace Corps volunteers, Jamdrak became curious about the West. With the help of Chögyam Trungpa and Akong Rinpoche he obtained a visa and plane ticket to travel to Samye Ling in Scotland in 1969.

His arrival in 1960s Britain coincided with the peak of the hippie movement. Jamdrak mixed with the young, rich and famous people flocking to Samye Ling, and he shared their hedonistic lifestyle with enthusiasm. His brother, busy running the monastery, tolerated his excesses hoping that he would grow out of them eventually.

The turning point for Jamdrak was a fishing trip to Orkney with a friend. With his Buddhist upbringing, he was uncomfortable with the idea of fishing but he went along with it to please his friend and soon caught many fish, which his friend killed with a blow to the head. His friend took a proud picture of all the dead fish and showed this to Akong Rinpoche on their return. Akong Rinpoche was deeply sad at seeing this picture—killing is against all the tenets of Buddhism—and lamented how he had promised their parents he would look after his younger brother and felt that he had failed.

This turned the heart of the young rebel back to the Buddha Dharma. He heard that the Karmapa was going to the United States at the invitation of Chögyam Trungpa, and requested that he be allowed to join him on a tour of the United States and Canada. On the tour a Chinese benefactor donated a large tract of land for a Buddhist centre in New York. Jamdrak was appointed secretary and treasurer. With many visiting lamas, Jamdrak had the opportunity to establish the preliminary practises of the four foundations. Wishing to take his practise further he became a monk in 1980, and was ordained by the 16th Karmapa, and named Yeshe Losal.

== Long retreat ==
Yeshe Losal practised hard and retreated in a small quiet cottage. Soon the tranquility was shattered by building work on a nearby shrine room and it became increasingly uncomfortable as electricity, water and sanitation were disconnected. Remembering the trials of Milarepa, Yeshe Losal carried on with his practice. Moreover, beavers built a nest beneath his retreat house while raccoons and skunks fighting over territory left stinking reminders of their presence. After five years of retreat and enduring many hardships he emerged and was recognised as a lama. It has been said that his body was almost skeletal, but his mind crystal clear.

Akong Rinpoche requested that Lama Yeshe move to Purelands, a purpose-built retreat centre at Samye Ling, and in time he became the retreat master in 1988. At Akong Rinpoche's request, in 1995 Lama Yeshe was confirmed as abbot of Samye Ling by the Tai Situpa.

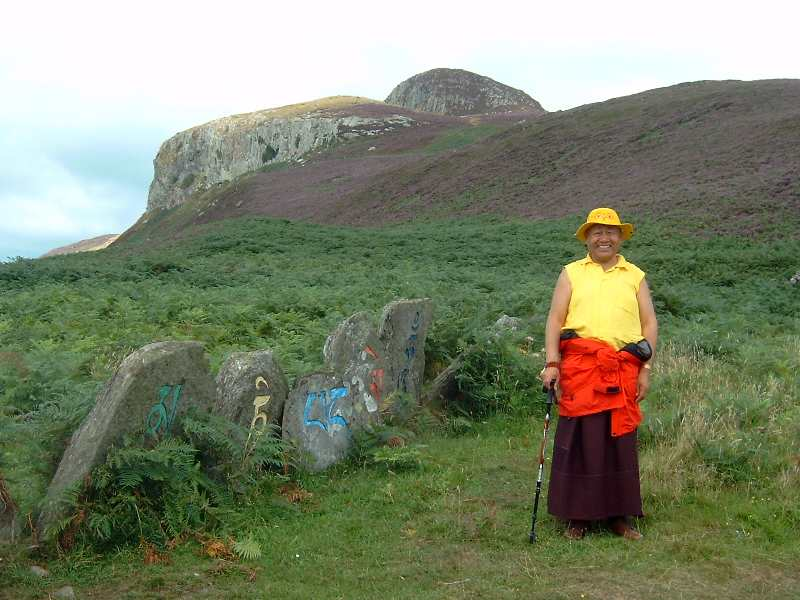
Lama Yeshe Losal Rinpoche on Holy Island with stones decorated with the mantra Om Mani Peme Hung

== Holy Isle ==
In 1990 Kay Morris came to Samye Ling with a strange request. She was the owner of Holy Isle a small island near the Isle of Arran in the Firth of Clyde. She wished to sell the Island and had had a vision of Mary, the mother of Jesus who asked her to approach the Buddhists at Samye Ling. Lama Yeshe visited the island in December and felt an immediate affinity for the rugged landscape, reminiscent of his homeland. Looking out over the lights of Lamlash bay, he was reminded of a vision he had while practising dream yoga on retreat. He had experienced flying over a beautiful island surrounded by lights. In April 1992 the Holy Isle was bought by the Rokpa Trust. Since then Lama Yeshe has been instrumental in establishing the Centre for World Peace and Health, an environmentally designed residential venue for courses, conferences and retreats on Holy Island, and a monastery on the southern end of the Island for nuns on three year retreats.

The island is a sanctuary for wild life, and Lama Yeshe is active in promoting the case for Lamlash Bay to be no take zone, a wildlife reserve for marine life, perhaps an echo of his own life-changing fishing trip.

== Biographic book ==
He wrote his vital and spiritual biography in the book: Lama Yeshe Losal Rinpoche (1 April 2021). From a Mountain in Tibet: A Monk’s Journey. Penguin Life. ISBN 978-0241439272..
