= Gelek Rimpoche =

Nawang Gelek Rimpoche
- སྐྱབས་རྗེ་དགེ་ལེགས་རིན་པོ་ཆེ།
- Gelek Rinpoche
- Title: Lama

Personal life
- Born: 26 October 1939 Lhasa, Tibet
- Died: 15 February 2017 (aged 77) Ann Arbor, Michigan, United States
- Other names: Nyakre Khentrul Rinpoche, Kyabje Ngwang Gehlek Rimpoche, Gehlek Rimpoche, Kyabje Gelek Rimpoche

Religious life
- Religion: Tibetan Buddhist
- Order: Gelug
- School: Drepung Monastery
- Profession: teacher

Senior posting
- Teacher: Kyabje Trijang Rinpoche, Kyabje Ling Rinpoche, Khensur Denma Locho Rinpoche, Song Rinpoche
- Students: Allen Ginsberg, Philip Glass, Cyndi Lee, Joe Liozzo, Glenn Mullin, Robert Thurman

Kyabje Nawang Gehlek Rimpoche (Tibetan: སྐྱབས་རྗེ་དགེ་ལེགས་རིན་པོ་ཆེ།, Wylie: skyabs rje dge legs rin po che/) was a Tibetan Buddhist lama born in Lhasa, Tibet on October 26, 1939. His personal name was Gelek; kyabje and rimpoche are titles meaning "teacher" (lit., "lord of refuge") and "precious," respectively; he is known to Tibetans as Nyakre Khentrul Rinpoche. According to Thupten Jinpa, principal English translator to the Dalai Lama, he is considered

"an important link to the great lineages of Tibet's great masters, especially of the Geluk school. Known more famously for the Tibetans as Nyakre Khentrul Rinpoche, Rinpoche had been instrumental in reprinting many of the Geluk texts in the 1970s, and also remained an important object of affection for both Kyabje Ling Rinpoche and Kyabje Trijang Rinpoche. Of course, his emergence as one of the great Tibetan teachers in the West has also been a source of inspiration for many."

Known for his memory, intellectual insight, familiarity with modern culture, and effectiveness as a teacher of Western practitioners of Tibetan Buddhism, Rimpoche taught in English without a translator, claiming he learned "English watching the soap opera Days of Our Lives."

== Early life and education ==
Gelek Rimpoche was recognized at the age of four as a tulku, an incarnate lama. He was "recognized as the incarnation of one of the Gyuto Tantric College abbots called Tashi Namgyal. I believe I was recognized by the late Pabongka Dechen Nyingpo – the famous Pabongka." His father was the 10th Demo Rinpoche and his uncle was the 13th Dalai Lama, Thubten Gyatso. He received the highest scholastic degree of Geshe Lharampa, equivalent to a PhD, at the exceptionally young age of twenty, at Drepung Monastic University which he attended from the age of four to twenty.

He was educated alongside the 14th Dalai Lama, Tenzin Gyatso who said "he completed his traditional Buddhist training as a monk in Tibet prior to the Chinese Takeover." Rimpoche was tutored by many of Tibet's greatest teachers including the 14th Dalai Lama's senior and junior tutors, Kyabje Ling Rinpoche and Kyabje Trijang Rinpoche, who sent him to the West to teach, and Denma Locho Rinpoche and Song Rinpoche.

== Exile ==
In 1959, ten days after the Dalai Lama fled to India, Gelek Rimpoche led a large group of Tibetans from Tibet into exile in India.

"They were stalled at the foot of the Himalayas. Only a few miles away, over a cluster of four peaks, lay Arunachal Pradesh in India, and freedom. Time and time again throughout the day members of the group tried the treacherous climb, yet they were unable to find passage. To get here they had traversed mile after mile of rugged terrain while strafed by Chinese aircraft. There was no turning back. Tired, hungry and cold, they sought advice from an incarnate lama who had joined their exodus – nineteen-year-old Nawang Gehlek Rinpoche. "I sat there and looked at the situation, I don't know if it was a coincidence or the effects of a flu shot or common sense, but I saw that the range had four peaks and I thought we should zigzag across to the farthest one on the right. So I happened to be the one to suggest that route and the people began to follow me." "The route he suggested became a major route for tens of thousands in the coming decades."

He then settled at a temporary camp with other lamas and monks in Buxa, India, where his education continued, although "there were no books, and classes had to be taught from memory only." He was one of the first students of the Young Lamas Home School.

Later, he relinquished monastic life. "Many other Rinpoches, including Kyabje Trijang Rinpoche and Kyabje Ling Rinpoche, told me, "Even though you didn't remain as a monk, it doesn't mean you've resigned as a rinpoche." They told me I still have to carry the banner of Buddhism. So that's how it is." He was named director of Tibet House in New Delhi, India, in 1965. In the 1970s, he served as head of Tibetan services and as a radio host at All India Radio. He preserved over 170 volumes of rare Tibetan manuscripts that would have otherwise been lost and conducted over 1000 interviews, compiling an oral history of the fall of Tibet to Communist China that is in the US Library of Congress' Tibetan Oral History Archive Project. In 1964, he was an exchange student at Cornell University.

== Life in the west ==
Rimpoche moved to Ann Arbor, Michigan, in 1987 to teach Buddhism at the request of two local women, Aura Glaser and Sandra Finkel, who met him on a trip to India during the mid-1980s. He first taught in Ann Arbor in 1985. He helped a Case Western Reserve professor write a book on Tibetan history for two years in Cleveland, then moved to Ann Arbor. In 1988, with Glaser and Finkel, he founded and was president of Jewel Heart, a nonprofit "spiritual, cultural, and humanitarian organization that translates the ancient wisdom of Tibetan Buddhism into contemporary life," in Ann Arbor, which has expanded to Bloomfield Hills, Michigan, Chicago, Cleveland, Nebraska, New York, Malaysia, and The Netherlands. The Dalai Lama visited Jewel Heart in Ann Arbor in 2008.

Beat poet Allen Ginsberg was among the more prominent of Jewel Heart's members. Ginsberg met with Gelek Rinpoche through the modern composer Philip Glass in 1989, and they became great friends. Allen and Philip jointly staged benefits for the Jewel Heart organization. Professor Robert Thurman, Joe Liozzo, and Glenn Mullin, are also Jewel Heart members and frequent lecturers. Cyndi Lee also teaches at Jewel Heart. Lodi Gyari Rinpoche, Venerable Thubten Chodron, and Michael Imperioli were also students of Rimpoche's. He became an American citizen in July 1994.

Gelek Rinpoche died on February 15, 2017, in Ann Arbor, Michigan, after undergoing surgery the previous month.

Demo Rinpoche, Rimpoche's nephew, has served as Jewel Heart's Resident Spiritual Director, since 2018.

In 2021 Tibet House US in New York City, partnered with the Allen Ginsberg estate, and Jewel Heart International, on Transforming Minds: Kyabje Gelek Rimpoche and Friends, a gallery show, video, and eventually online exhibition, of photos and drawings by Allen Ginsberg with whom Rimpoche had an "indissoluble bond," exemplifying the "transformational nature of this time in US history." "Fifty negatives guided by Allen's extensive notes on the contact sheets and images he'd circled with the intention to print," featured images of Rimpoche with friends, including "other great Tibetan masters, including Ribur Rimpoche and Khyongla Rato Rimpoche, images we had not known about," and "monks, Tibetologists, friends, and students, including Philip Glass, artist Francesco Clemente, founder of Tibet House US, Robert Thurman, poet Anne Waldman, and songwriter, singer, and poet, Patti Smith."

== Publications ==
Gehlek Rimpoche assisted Melvyn C. Goldstein in his writing of A History of Modern Tibet, Volume 1: The Demise of the Lamaist State, 1913-1951.

In 2001, Rimpoche's teaching with many biographical details, Good Life, Good Death: Tibetan Wisdom on Reincarnation, with a foreword by the Dalai Lama, and an introduction by Robert Thurman, was published. "Buddhist readers will cheer about this fresh voice, and even those who don't believe in reincarnation will find something valuable in this short meditation on death.

Many of Rimpoche's teachings since the mid 1980s, including intermediate and vajrayana lightly edited transcripts and books, are available.

== Archive ==
The Gelek Rimpoche Archive, "arguably are the largest, or one of the largest collections of authentic Tibetan Buddhist teachings in English of a Tibetan master," was established online by the Gelek Rimpoche Foundation. Free of charge, the archive contains more than five hundred teachings and more informal talks comprising over 1800 video and 2900 audio files, often accompanied by searchable verbatim and compiled transcripts.

== Selected bibliography ==
- Good Life, Good Death: Tibetan Wisdom on Reincarnation, (with Gini Alhadeff and Mark Magill, foreword by His Holiness the Dalai Lama, introduction by Robert Thurman), Riverhead Books, 2001, ISBN 1-57322-196-1
- The Tara Box: Rituals for Protection and Healing From the Female Buddha (with Brenda Rosen), New World Library, 2004, ISBN 1-57731-461-1
- Essentials of Modern Literary Tibetan: A Reading Course and Reference Grammar (with Melvyn C. Goldstein, Lobsang Phuntshog), University of California Press, 1991, ISBN 978-0520076228, ISBN 0520076222
- How the Mind Works, Jewel Heart, 2016, ASIN B01H2MXIDE
- Perfection of Wisdom: An Essential Explanation of the Mantra and the Five Paths, 2014, ASIN B00KCX3IUE
- The Three Principles of the Path: A Brief Explanation, Jewel Heart, 2014, ASIN B00KDIZBZ8
- Shantideva's Guide to the Bodhisattva's Way of Life: Chapter 3; Full Acceptance of the Awakening Mind, Jewel Heart, 2013, ASIN B00BUVLZNE
- 37 Wings of Change, Jewel Heart, 2012, ASIN B006WFKPUM
- Shantideva's Guide to the Bodhisattva's Way of Life: Chapter 6; Patience, Jewel Heart, 2010, ASIN B00BUYYN3U
- The Four Mindfulnesses: On the Basis of a Poem by the Seventh Dalai Lama with Commentary by Kyabje Ling Rinpoche, Jewel Heart, 2009, ISBN 193499409X
- The Four Noble Truths, Jewel Heart, 2009, ISBN 1934994057
- Shantideva's Guide to the Bodhisattva's Way of Life: Chapter 7; Enthusiasm, Jewel Heart, 2008, ASIN B00BUYYN58
- GOM: A Course In Meditation, Jewel Heart, 2005, ASIN B004N84VLE
- Lam Rim: Foundations of the Path, Jewel Heart, 2005, ASIN B00KD3OOLU
- Transforming Negativities, Jewel Heart, 2004, ASIN B004N63770
- Catalogue : first exhibition in new Tibet House, (with Gyaltsen Yeshey, Nicholas Ribush, Trisha Donnelly); Tibet House, New Delhi, India, 1979, OCLC Number: 37437276
