= Lati Rinpoche =

Tibetan Buddhist monk

Lati Rinpoche (1922 – 12 April 2010) was a Tibetan Buddhist monk who was identified as a reincarnation of an earlier practitioner.

== Early life and education ==
Born in the Kham region of Eastern Tibet in 1922, Lati Rinpoche was identified as the reincarnation of a great practitioner by Gongkar Rinpoche and entered monastic life at the age of 10.

At the age of fifteen, he enrolled in Gaden Shartse Norling College, one of the 'great three' Gelukpa university monasteries of Tibet.

In 1959, Lati Rinpoche sat for the Geshe Lharmapa examination and he was conferred as “Geshe Lharampa”. In 1960, Lati Rinpoche joined the tantric college in Lhasa, and started intensive study in Tantra.

== Career ==
In 1964, Lati Rinpoche left Tibet to join the 14th Dalai Lama in exile. On arrival in Dharamsala, he was appointed as the spiritual advisor to the 14th Dalai Lama.

From 1976, Lati Rinpoche taught at the Namgyal Gomba (the 14th Dalai Lama's personal monastery). In the same year, he was appointed as the Abbot of the Shartse Norling College of Gaden Monastery], a replacement university in the like of Gaden Shartse Norling College, for the monkhood in exile.

== Books ==
- Lati Rinpoche, Jeffrey Hopkins, H.H. the 14th Dalai Lama (Foreword), Death, Intermediate State and Rebirth, ISBN 978-0-937938-00-3
- Lati Rinpoche, Mind in Tibetan Buddhism, ISBN 978-0-937938-02-7
- Denma Locho Rinpoche, Leah Zabler, Lati Rinpoche, Meditative States in Tibetan Buddhism, ISBN 978-0-86171-119-2
