= Karma Thinley Rinpoche =

Tibetan lama (born 1931)

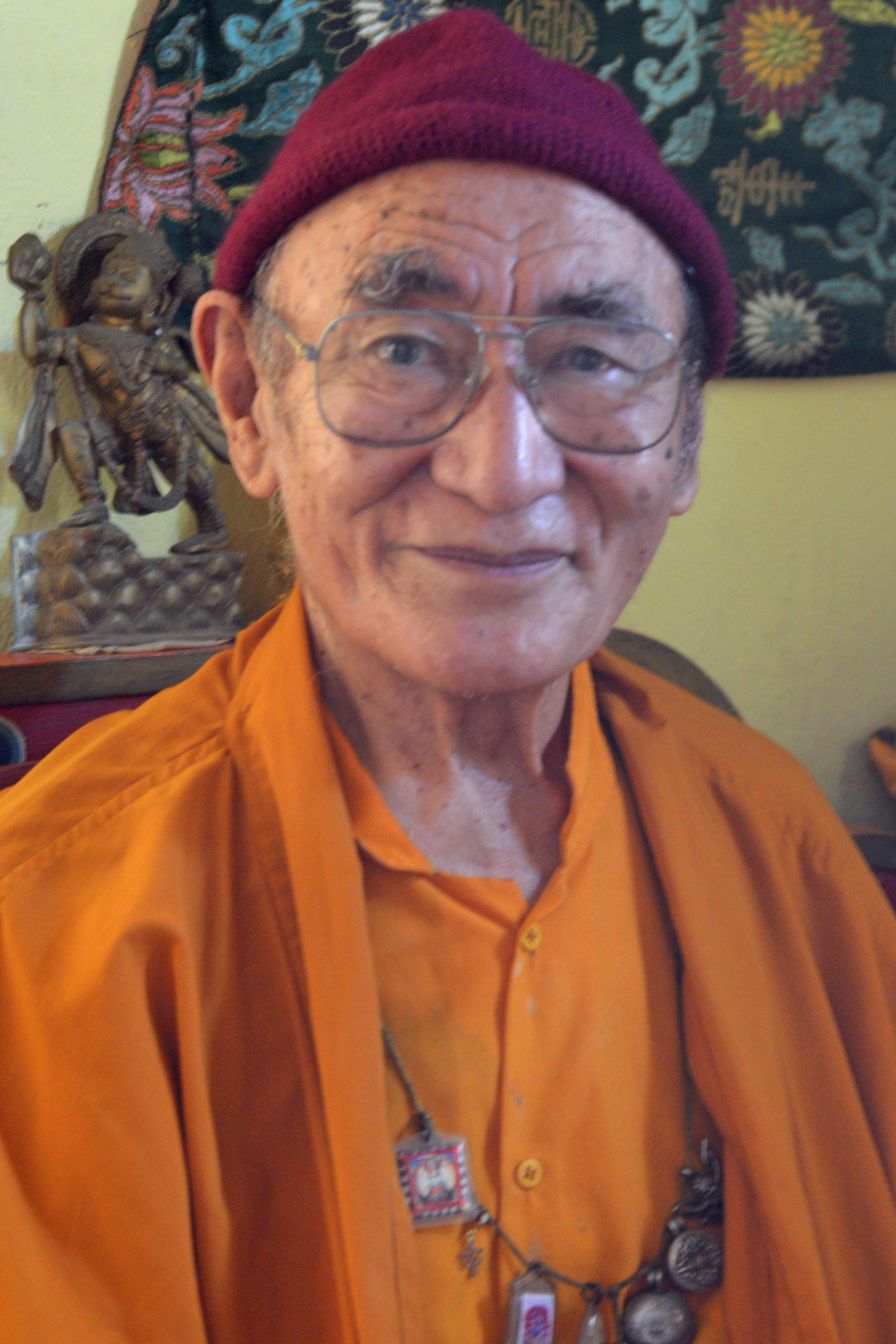
- Title: Karma Thinleypa IV

Personal life
- Born: 1931 (age 94–95) Nangchen, Tibet
- Education: Riwoche
- Other name: Lama Wangchen (bla ma dbang chen)

Religious life
- Religion: Tibetan Buddhism
- School: Kagyu, Sakya
- Lineage: Mahamudra, Lamdré

Senior posting
- Teacher: XVIth Gyalwa Karmapa, Dilgo Khyentse, Khunu Lama Tenzin Gyaltsen, Ling Rinpoche
- Based in: Toronto, Ontario, Canada
- Reincarnation: Beru Kunrik, Palkhang Lotsawa

Karma Thinley Rinpoche ཀརྨ་ཕྲིན་ལས་རིན་པོ་ཆེ་ (born 1931), is an important master of the Kagyu Mahamudra, Sakya Lamdré and Chod traditions of Tibetan Buddhism active in the west and Nepal. He is also well regarded by Tibetans as a scholar, poet and artist.

== Life ==
Karma Thinley Rinpoche was born in Nangchen, Kham, in Qinghai in 1931. At age two, he was recognized as a reincarnation of Beru Shaiyak Lama Kunrik.

Throughout the 1950s, Rinpoche made pilgrimages to Radeng, Samye, Sakya and Lhasa. Eventually, he settled for a period at Tsurphu Monastery, traditional seat of the Karmapa. The 16th Karmapa recognized Rinpoche as a tulku of Karma Thinleypa.

Karma Thinley Rinpoche left Tibet for India in 1959 and during the 1960s was abbot of the Young Lamas Home School and Karma Drubgyu Thargay Ling nunnery both founded by Freda Bedi in Dalhousie, HP. There he was one of the first Tibetan refugee Lamas to teach western students. In 1971 he accompanied a group of Tibetan refugees resettled in Ontario, Canada as their Lama and in 1973 established a Buddhist center, Kampo Gangra Drubgyud Ling meditation centre in Toronto, Ontario, Canada.

In 1982, Karma Tinley Rinpoche was able to visit his homeland Nangchen for the first time since leaving a quarter of a century earlier. Returning several times since then he has established a temple in Shorda, capital of Nangchen District and a school for nomad children in the Sangshung valley.

In 1988, he also established a nunnery, Tekchen Lekshay Ling, at Boudhanath Nepal and subsequently a small meditation retreat center at Pharping.

His students include Lama Jampa Thaye, a British Buddhist teacher who is Karma Thinley Rinpoche's dharma-regent and founded the Dechen sangha, and the Nepalese Lama, Acharya Mahayogi Sridhar Rana

== Bibliography ==
- Karma Thinley. History of 16 Karmapas. Shambhala (2001) ISBN 1-57062-644-8
- Karma Thinley Rinpoche. The Telescope of Wisdom. Ganesha Press (2009) ISBN 978-0-9509119-6-0
- Karma Thinley Rinpoche, 2018. The Lamp that Dispels Darkness: A Commentary on Karmapa Rangjung Dorje's Distinguishing Consciousness and Primordial Wisdom ISBN 978-0998750781
- Dispelling the Darkness of Suffering: A Concise Word Commentary on the Seven Points of Mind Training of the Mahayana,, Rabsel Publications (2023) ISBN 978-2360170531
