= Akong Rinpoche =

Tibetan Buddhist tulku (1940–2013)

Chöje Akong Tulku Rinpoche
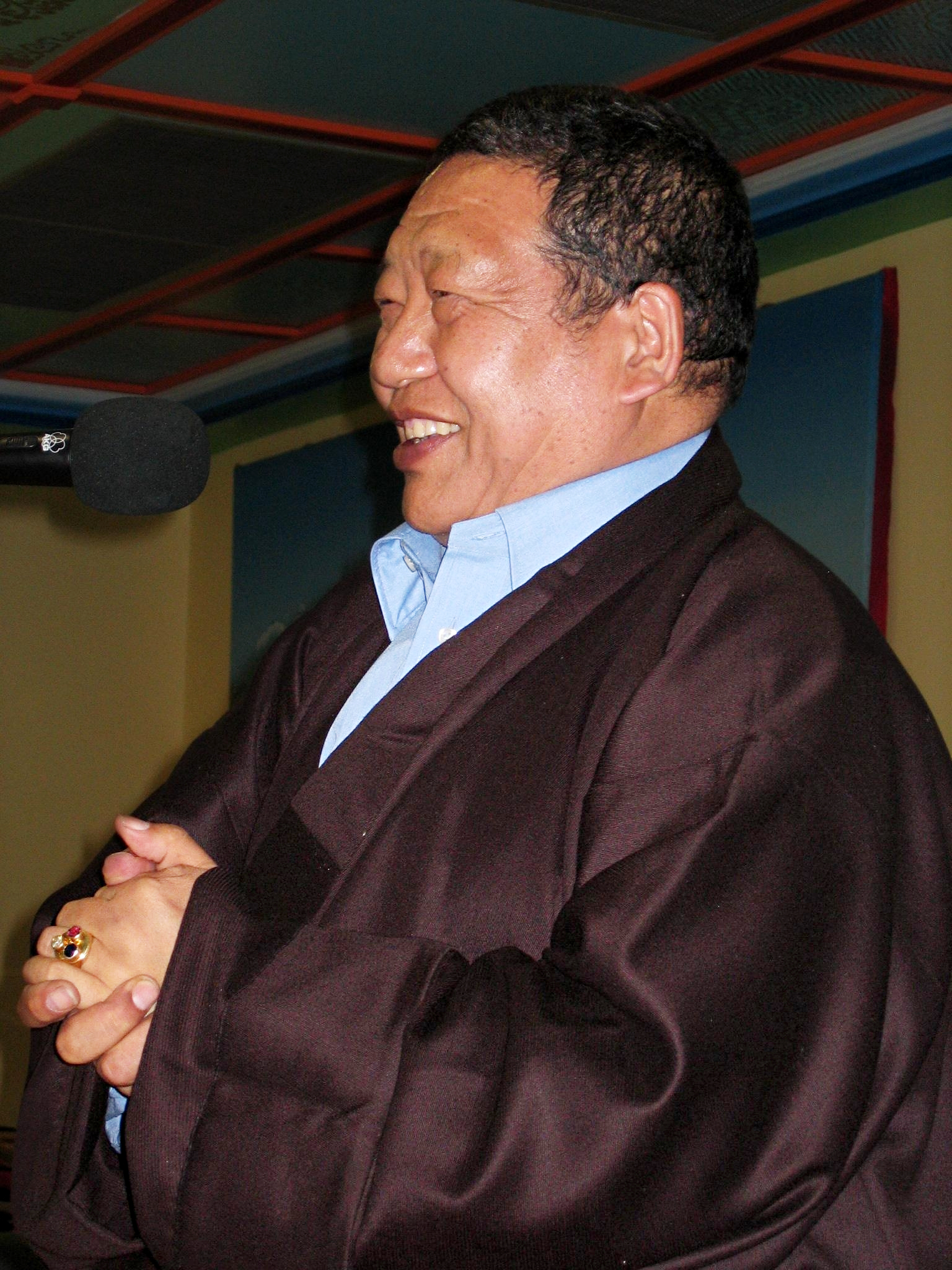
- Akong Rinpoche at his 65th Birthday celebration in 2005

Personal life
- Born: Shetrup Akong Tarap; 25 December 1939 Dharak Village, Riwoche, Kham, Tibet
- Died: 8 October 2013 (aged 73) Chengdu, China
- Occupation: Lama & physician

Religious life
- Religion: Tibetan Buddhism
- School: Kagyu
- Lineage: Karma Kagyu

Senior posting
- Teacher: Shechen Kongtrul Rinpoche; 16th Gyalwang Karmapa
- Reincarnation: Akong Lama

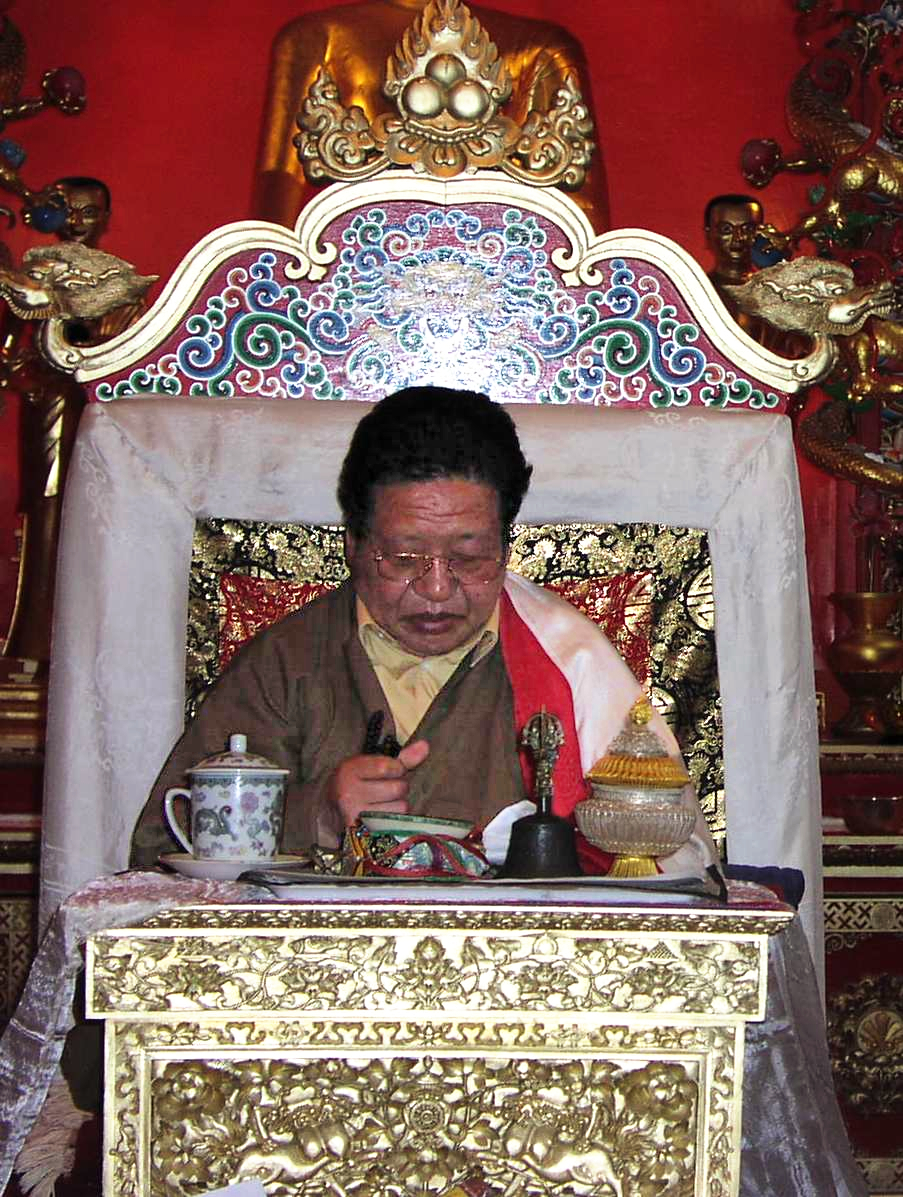
Akong Rinpoche in the Temple at Samye Ling

Chöje Akong Tulku Rinpoche (Tibetan: ཆོས་རྗེ་ཨ་དཀོན་སྤྲུལ་སྐུ་རིན་པོ་ཆེ, 25 December 1939 – 8 October 2013) was a tulku in the Kagyu school of Tibetan Buddhism and co-founder of the Samye Ling Monastery in Scotland, Tara Rokpa Therapy and charity ROKPA International.

== Early life ==
Choje Akong Tulku Rinpoche was born in 1940, in the village of Dharak near Riwoche in Kham, Eastern Tibet. Aged two he was discovered by a search party seeking the reincarnation of the 1st Akong, Abbot of Dolma Lhakang Monastery near Chamdo. The monastery had previously not followed the tradition of having a reincarnate lama at its helm, but was ordered to find the 2nd Akong tulku by the second Kongtrul, Karse Rinpoche, the lineage master whose life he had saved when it had looked as though death was imminent. Two months later Karse Kongtrul had recovered, and, about to leave for Palpung with the 10th Trungpa Rinpoche, he looked back over his shoulder and commented, "If I can sit on the fearless lion-throne and live on to benefit the teachings and beings for a long time, it will be due to the kindness of this lama." A group of lamas from Dolma Lhakang, therefore, requested guidance from the 16th Karmapa as to how to locate the new tulku. Aged 4, the new incarnation was taken to Dolma Lhakang to receive an education that included the traditional training of a tulku and traditional Tibetan medicine, since his predecessor, Karma Miyo, was considered an accomplished physician. When only a teenager he took complete control of the monastery, performing religious ceremonies and treating the ill in Tsawa Gang, a huge and remote nomadic area, in which Dolma Lhakang is the principal monastery. Along with other notable Kagyu lamas, such as Thrangu Rinpoche and Chogyam Trungpa Rinpoche, he later went to the monastic university of Shechen Monastery where he received a transmission of the Kagyu and Nyingma lineages from Kongtrul Rinpoche of Shechen. Khenpo Gangshar was also teaching the 'crazy wisdom' path there, and they received the mind transmission from him.

After Shechen Kongtrul, Akong's main guru was the 16th Gyalwa Karmapa, who encouraged and guided his activity as a teacher of Buddhism, and authorised him as a teacher of Tibetan medicine. In 1959, in the aftermath of that year's Tibetan Rebellion, he fled to India at the age of twenty, notably with the 11th Chogyam Trungpa Rinpoche, and his younger brother, who later became known as Lama Yeshe Losal Rinpoche. Of the 300 in the party, only 13 arrived successfully in India. The harrowing journey was forced into a major detour, due to the widespread presence of Chinese soldiers, who were trying to prevent the escape of refugees. The journey took so long that they ran out of food whilst still far from their destination. Starving and having unanimously decided not to kill animals to support themselves, they eventually had to boil leather shoes and bags to make soup to survive. Nevertheless, against all odds, they did make it. After spending time in refugee camps Akong and Trungpa Rinpoches were befriended by Freda Bedi. who would become Sister Palmo, almost certainly the first close student of European ancestry of the Karmapa lineage. She took them into her own home, then later arranged for them to help her run the Young Lamas Home School in Dalhousie, NW India. In 1963, a friend of Freda Bedi's sponsored the two to go to Oxford where Trungpa would study comparative religion at the university. As only Trungpa had a bursary, Akong worked as a hospital orderly in the Radcliffe Infirmary in order to support himself, Trungpa and Lama Chime Tulku Rinpoche (who had joined them at Oxford).

== Activities ==
Akong Rinpoche's activity was on an international scale and unusually diverse, but it can be summarised as Dharma, healing (including Tibetan Medicine and psychotherapy), and charity.

=== Dharma ===
In 1967 he co-founded Samye Ling in Scotland with Trungpa Rinpoche. Since it was the first Buddhist monastery in the West it was named after Samye in Tibet, established by Guru Rinpoche in the eighth century. It remains one of Europe's largest Buddhist monasteries. Akong himself was reluctant to teach, instead preferring to invite Tibetan Buddhism's greatest teachers and lineage masters to Samye Ling and its many satellite centres in Europe and Africa. One of the few overseas lamas to be able to return repeatedly to his homeland from 1992 onwards, he managed to rebuild and support his monastery there, as well as to foster the resurgence of monasteries and teaching colleges of all lineages He built huge statues of Guru Rinpoche stupas, and sponsored the rebuilding of the mani wall at Simdzi, Sichuan. He also became a key figure in the collection, preservation and printing of rare Buddhist and medical texts, many of which had been on the point of disappearing completely at the time of the Cultural Revolution.

Akong was given the title Chöjé, meaning Lord of Dharma, by the 16th Karmapa in 1974 in recognition of his special qualities.

In 1992, he was tasked with finding the latest Karmapa incarnation Urgyen Drodul Trinley Dorje relying upon the prediction letter that had been discovered by Kentin Tai Situ Rinpoche. In this search Akong represented Tai Situpa and Sherab Tarchin represented Goshir Gyaltsab Rinpoche, two out of four of the Regents authorised by the 16th Karmapa to uphold the lineage until his return. Having brought Karmapa to Tsurphu Monastery, Karmapa's principal seat in Tibet, it fell to Akong Rinpoche to organise his enthronement, with people travelling from all over the Tibetan region to attend. This was the first occasion that the enthronement of a lama of such prominence was permitted by the authorities in modern times. In common with the extensive activity to help Tibetans there, it would not have been possible without Akong's considerable networking skills. As Karmapa Urgyen Trinley Dorje later wrote, "I believe he was uniquely capable of doing that work. He dealt in a direct way with the Chinese authorities, while maintaining his integrity; he was very courageous in this, and I think the Chinese respected him."

=== Healing ===
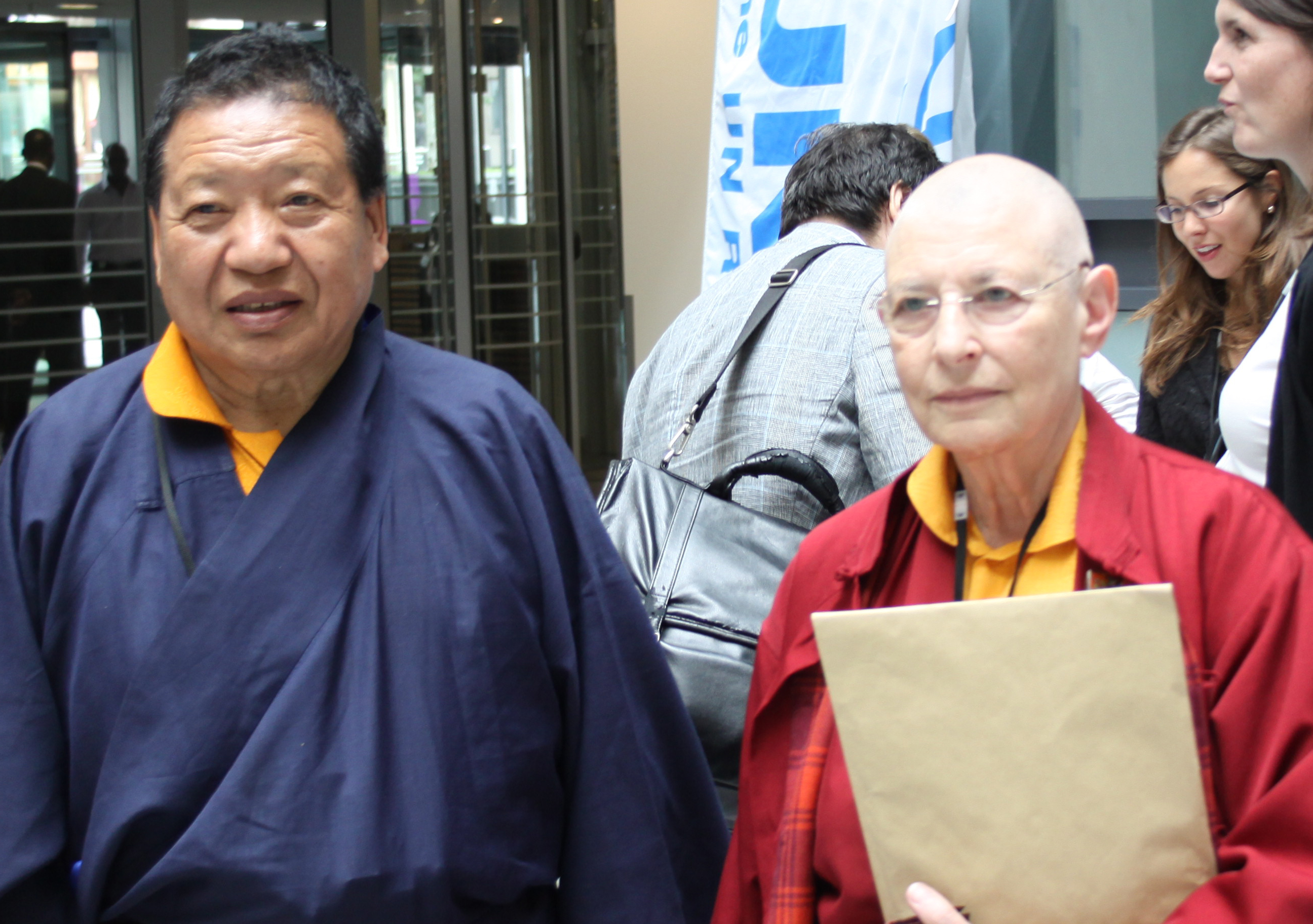
Akong Rinpoche and Tsultrim Zangmo in 2011

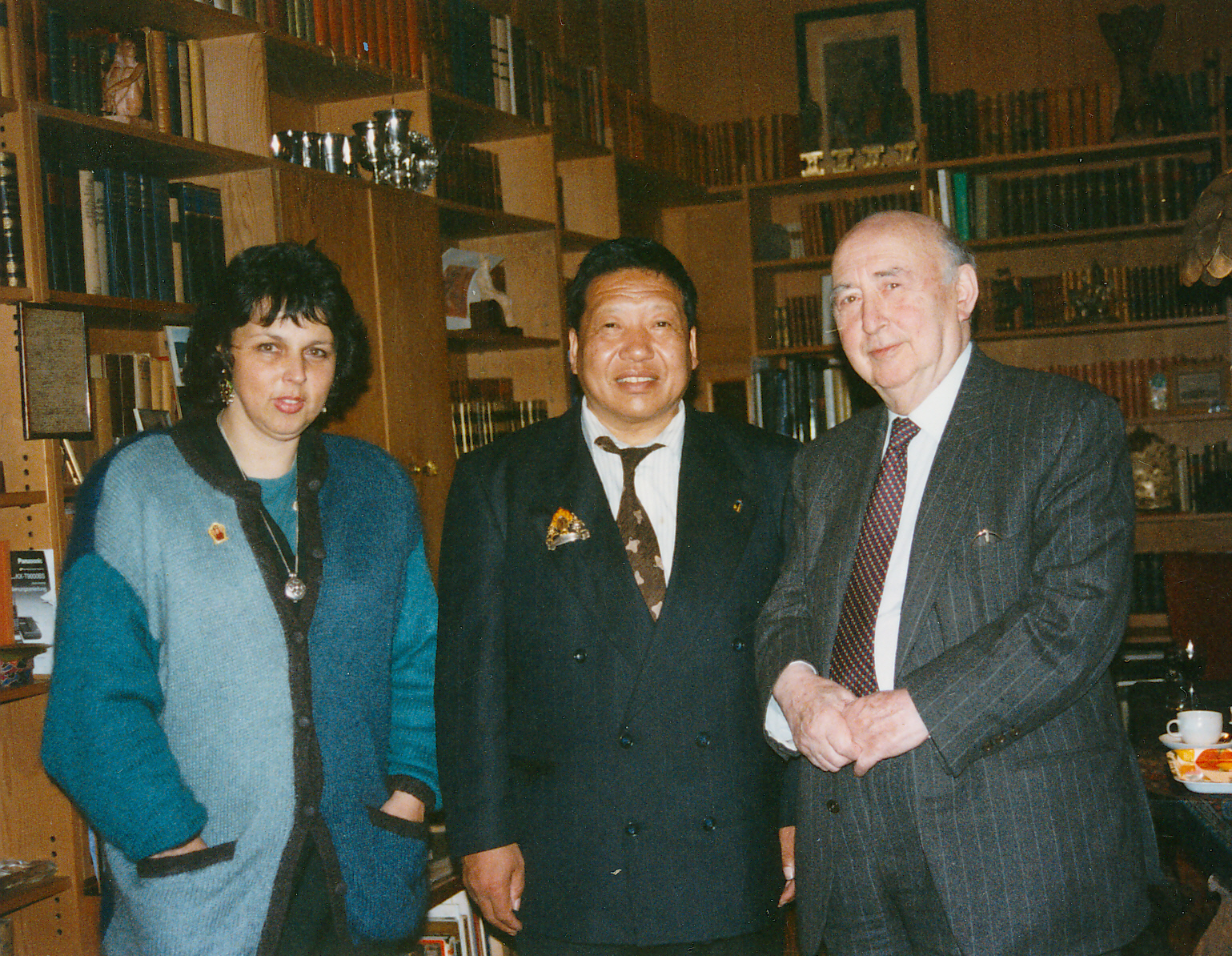
Lea and Veit Wyler with Akong Rinpoche- the three founders of ROKPA International

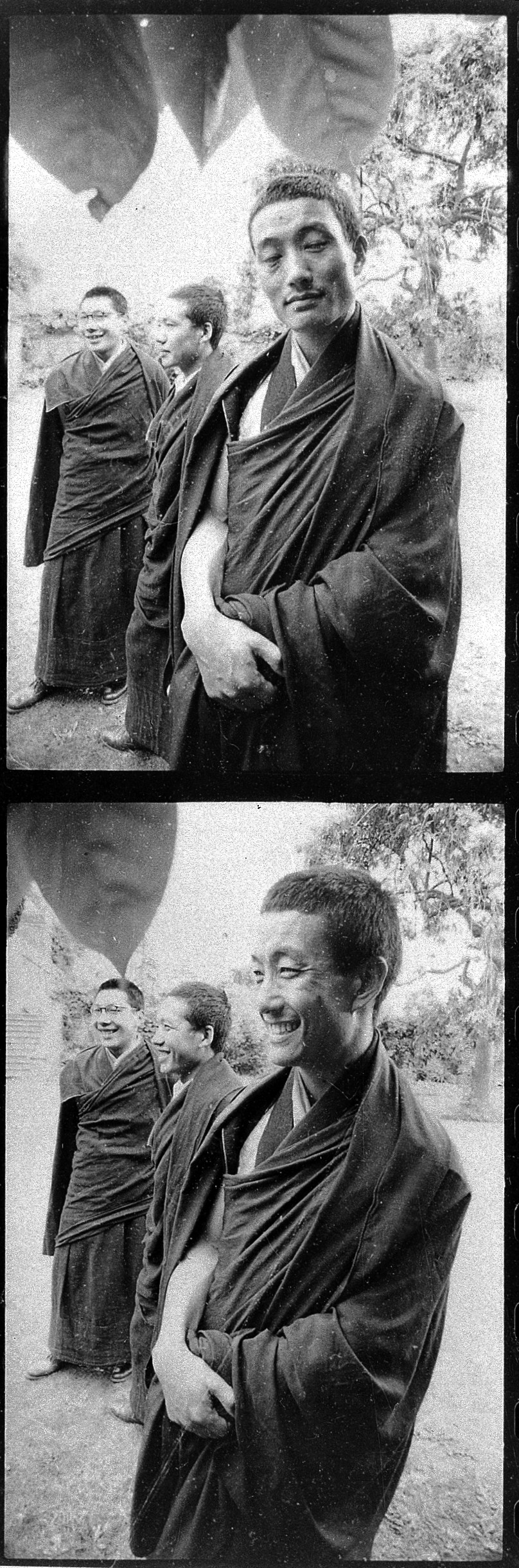
Akong Rinpoche (center) in rare 1963 photo with two other Tibetan refugee lamas Chogyam Trungpa Rinpoche (left) and Jampal Kunzang Rinpoche Rechung (right)

Akong Rinpoche was a pioneer in bringing Traditional Tibetan Medicine (TTM) to the West, and also in developing a new form of psychotherapy or mind-training, known as Tara Rokpa Therapy.

Tara Rokpa Therapy was founded upon his spiritual and medical knowledge, in conjunction with the skills of a number of students, amongst whom were psychiatrists, psychotherapists, art therapists, and alternative therapists. The ten-year training was authenticated by the UK Council for Psychotherapy and also meets the standards required by the Irish Council of Psychotherapy and the European Association for Psychotherapy. Akong Rinpoche produced a book with his students Clive Holmes and Edie Irwin entitled Taming the Tiger: Tibetan Teachings for Improving Daily Life, which describes many of the exercises practiced in Tara Rokpa Therapy. The book aims to help those seeking to understand the source of their suffering and to heal that through relaxation, meditation, and self-knowledge.

Faced with a situation in which people with serious mental health issues were arriving at Samye Ling, for whom normal spiritual training was beyond reach, in 1989 Akong developed a community-based therapeutic home for such people, known as Lothlorien.

Akong Rinpoche fostered the practice of Traditional Tibetan Medicine (TTM), both in Tibet and in Europe. In 2004 along with Dr. Lobsang Dhonden Soktsang and Dr. Tamdin S Bradley he founded The British Association of Traditional Tibetan Medicine (BATTM) whose aim is to preserve and promote the unique system of traditional Tibetan medicine. In 1994 Akong Rinpoche succeeded in bringing Tibet's most eminent traditional doctor, Khenpo Troru Tsenam, to teach the foundations of TTM on a four-year programme at the newly established Tara College of Traditional Tibetan Medicine at Samye Ling. Clinics were established, and legal recognition of Tibetan medicine, as a "herbal medicine", obtained in the UK. In Tibet, under the auspices of ROKPA, he established TTM clinics and trained over 600 TTM doctors, many of whom had attended schools established for orphans. Every ROKPA doctor made an agreement to return to serve in their own villages for at least six years after graduation. He further created a programme to preserve the herbs used in Tibetan medicine that new demand was driving close to extinction, even going so far as to bring three young doctors to the Royal Botanical Garden Edinburgh to study horticulture and biodynamics In 2009, Akong gave a presentation on Tibetan medical treatments using mantras and prayers at the Seventh International Congress on Traditional Asian Medicine held in Bhutan.

=== Charity ===
In the field of charity, he co-founded ROKPA International with Lea Wyler and her father Dr, Viet Wyler in 1980. ROKPA is Tibetan for "help" or "friend". Its motto is "Helping where help is needed." An international humanitarian organisation, it works principally but not exclusively in Tibet, Nepal, and Zimbabwe. The charitable aims of ROKPA are: "To promote Buddhism and to foster non-sectarian inter-religious dialogue and understanding. To provide medical care and therapy. To provide education. To relieve poverty.". Many of the projects described in the previous paragraphs were established through ROKPA, but there were also large-scale environmental projects, as well as numerous projects to preserve Tibetan language and culture in Tibet. In Nepal, the focus was directed mainly towards feeding the homeless, and with providing a home, education, and vocational training for street-kids. In Zimbabwe and South Africa ROKPA worked to provide food, vocational training, therapy, and economic opportunity from 1994 onwards, especially to help those whose lives had been devastated by the HIV Aids crisis and political turmoil.

In August 2011 Akong Rinpoche was among the guests in Lhasa at the invitation of the Communist Chinese during the 60th Anniversary of the "Peaceful Liberation of Tibet" functions, together with other "Patriotic Tibetans". Akong Rinpoche later commented that this was personally the most difficult thing he ever had to do. While it ignited heated controversy in the Tibetan community in exile, his students felt it was another example of how much he was prepared to sacrifice personally in order to carry out his aspirations to help others.

=== Written works ===
Rinpoche, Akong Tulku (1987). E. Irwin and C. Holmes (ed.). Taming the Tiger: Tibetan teachings for improving daily life. Dzalendra Publishing. ISBN 0712662200. (2nd edition published in 1994 by Rider)

Rinpoche, Akong Tulku (2005). C. Holmes (ed.). Restoring the Balance: Sharing Tibetan Wisdom. Dzalendra Publishing. ISBN 0-906181-22-4.

Rinpoche, Akong Tulku (2010). L. Zangmo and P. Wooton (ed.). Limitless Compassion: A Way of Life. Dzalendra Publishing. ISBN 9780906181232.

== Accolades and advisory positions ==
In 2011, Akong Tulku Rinpoche was chosen as a recipient of the "60 years, 6 people" accolade, in which the British Home Secretary honoured former refugees who have made an inspiring and meaningful contribution to Britain.

In 1993, he was made advisor to The School for Disabled Minorities in Lhasa; in 2008 he was made Religious Advisor to the Buddhist Society of Satham, Yunnan, and in 2009 he was appointed Advisor to the Medical College of Qinghai University. He also served as a consultant for the National Museum of Scotland.

== Death ==
Akong Rinpoche, and all those associated with him, knew that his life was in danger every time he visited Tibet since there were Chinese government officials who felt he was too close to HH Dalai Lama, while the government in India were suspicious about his relations with PR China. Before leaving for the last time, Akong Rinpoche set all his affairs in order and requested the help of all those who would play a leading part in Samye Ling's future. On 8 October 2013, it was reported that Akong Tulku Rinpoche had been murdered in Chengdu, China, along with two other monks, including Rinpoche's nephew, and his driver. The police said that three Tibetan men had been arrested and admitted carrying out the killings. The defence of the perpetrators was that they had been owed money, which Samye Ling strongly refuted. Its website subsequently said that the killers had intended to rob Akong Rinpoche of funds which were being distributed to various ROKPA projects. It was announced on 11 October 2013 that his body was being taken to the Tibetan Autonomous Region for a traditional cremation and ceremony at Dolma Lhakang. On 12 October 2013, Samye Ling released a statement confirming that one of the suspected killers had been named by Chengdu police as Tudeng Gusha, also known as Thubten Kunsal, who had spent some five years in the UK and who had made religious statues at Samye Ling and an associated centre in London. Thubten Kunsal's trial was held in August 2014. Akong's family sought clemency over a death sentence, saying that the crime was intolerable but that Buddhism promoted non-violence. The court reserved its decision for a later date.

In May 2014, a conference was held in Wolfson College, the University of Oxford, to commemorate Rinpoche's life and achievements. It was presided over by the Serthar Khenpo, Tsultrim Lodro Rinpoche, one of Tibet's most respected lamas, and a close friend of Akong Rinpoche. The speakers were those students of Akong who had carried out his activities in different fields over many years. Since his activity was so diverse, many of even his close students were unaware of the extent of his work outside their own particular areas. A further product of the conference was a book detailing this work, named after a favourite slogan of Akong's: "Only The Impossible is Worth Doing - Recollections of the Supreme Life & Activity of Choje Akong Rinpoche". Akong Rinpoche's younger brother Lama Yeshe Losal Rinpoche took over his spiritual duties as Abbot of Samye Ling. Although ROKPA was barred from returning to continue projects in Tibetan areas of China, other areas of Akong Rinpoche's activities continue to flourish. In a letter before his death, Akong Rinpoche entrusted the recognition of his next incarnation solely to the Gyalwang Karmapa Urgyen Trinley Dorje, who has duly promised to identify him on several occasions since then.
