= ROKPA International =

International humanitarian organisation

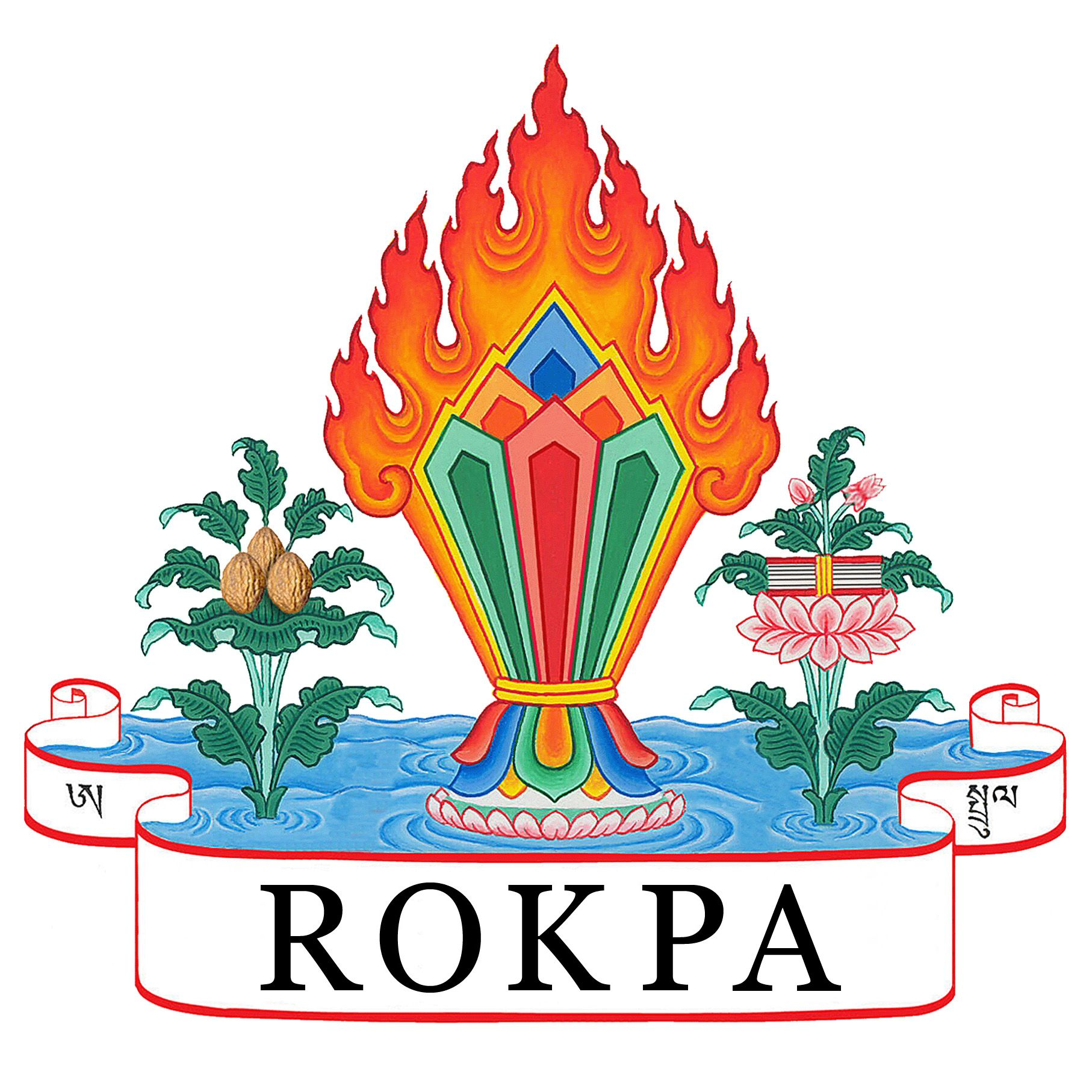
Logo of ROKPA

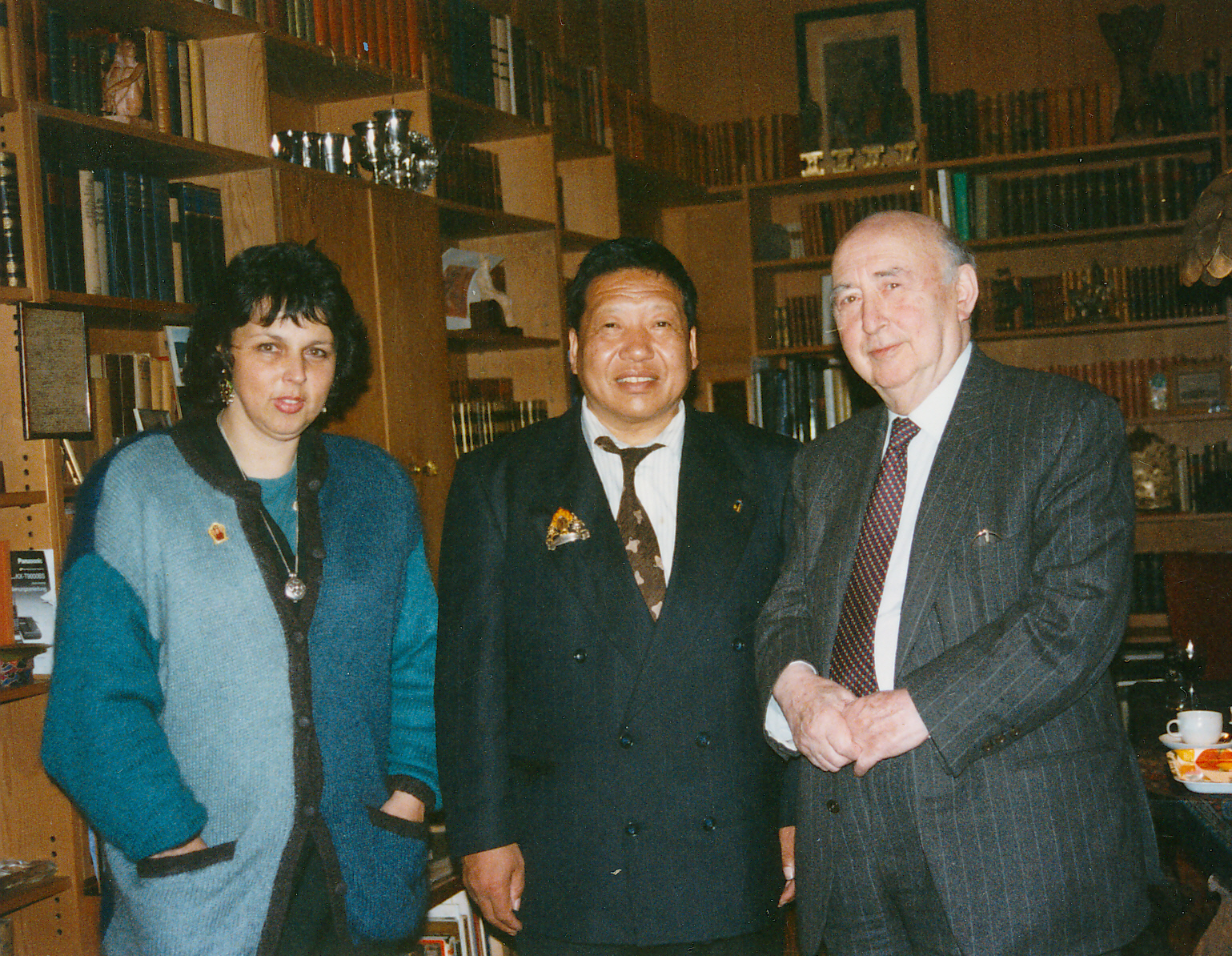
Lea Wyler, Akong Tulku Rinpoche, and Veit Wyler: the three founders of ROKPA

ROKPA International is an international humanitarian organisation founded in 1980 by the Tibetan lama and physician Akong Tulku Rinpoche, Swiss actress Lea Wyler and her father Veit Wyler. ROKPA International has its headquarters in Zurich, Switzerland, with national headquarters and branches in 18 countries, operating primarily in Nepal, Zimbabwe and South Africa, Its aim is to improve the quality of life of people in need irrespective of their religion, nationality or cultural background.

The name ROKPA is derived from the Tibetan word meaning "to help" or "friend". The organisation was inspired by a 1980 pilgrimage to Nepal and India, where the founders were moved by the extreme poverty of street children and the lack of basic medical care in remote regions. Initially, work focused on individual sponsorships. Between 1990 and 2016, ROKPA managed over 100 projects in the Tibetan areas of China. Following the tragic death of Akong Rinpoche in 2013, Lea Wyler assumed the presidency.

ROKPA's work is primarily centred on : education, children, women empowerment, healthcare, nutrition.Notable initiatives include the ROKPA Children's Home in Kathmandu, mobile medical clinics, and vocational training centres designed to provide long-term self-sufficiency. The organisation also manages social businesses, such as the ROKPA Guest House and the ROKPA Women's Workshop, to support its humanitarian initiatives.

== History ==
=== The Early Years (1980–1989) ===
- 1980: Founded on 27 March in Zurich by Dr Akong Tulku Rinpoche, Lea Wyler, and Dr Veit Wyler. Initial efforts focused on sponsorships for Tibetan refugees in India and Nepal.
- 1982: ROKPA officially registered as a charity in Switzerland.
- 1983: Dr Akong Tulku Rinpoche returned to his homeland in the Tibetan areas of China for the first time since 1959. Moved by the poverty, he began planning the first aid projects in Eastern Tibet.
- 1985-1988: The organisation expanded internationally, establishing branches in the UK, Germany, Belgium, and Holland.

=== Expansion and Global Impact (1990–2012) ===
- 1990: The ROKPA Soup Kitchen opened in Kathmandu, Nepal, providing hot meals to the destitute. The first formal projects were also launched in the Tibetan areas of China, focusing on education and cultural preservation.
- 1991–1993: A clothing depot and medical facility were added to the Kathmandu operations. In 1993, ROKPA inaugurated its first supported orphanage in Yushu, Qinghai.
- 1994: Dr Akong Tulku Rinpoche made his first formal visit to Zimbabwe, initiating food security projects for squatter camps.
- 1996: The first ROKPA Children's Home was established in Kathmandu, providing housing and education for street children.
- 1998: In South Africa, the organisation began supporting mothers of children with disabilities through the formation of the Batsiranai Cooperative in Harare.
- 2010: ROKPA provided significant disaster relief following the Yushu earthquake in the Tibetan Plateau. To combat sub-zero temperatures, the organization, in collaboration with the Swiss Agency for Development and Cooperation, supplied over 100 heated tents.

In 2018, Rokpa opened the Akong Rinpoche Memorial Centre (ARMC) in Kathmandu. Here, in cooperation with EHLsmile of the Lausanne Hotel Management School, young people are trained in hotel management and women in the extended women's workshop as seamstresses, knitters or weavers. The operation of the ARMC is partly financed by income from the Rokpa Guest House and the Rokpa Women's Workshop.
