= Jeffrey Hopkins =

American Tibetologist (1940–2024)

Jeffrey Hopkins (born Paul Jeffrey Hopkins; 1940 – July 1, 2024) was an American Tibetologist. He was Emeritus professor of Tibetan and Buddhist Studies at the University of Virginia, where he taught for more than three decades beginning in 1973. He authored more than twenty-five books about Tibetan Buddhism, among them the highly influential Meditation on Emptiness, which appeared in 1983, offering a pioneering exposition of Prasangika-Madyamika thought in the Geluk tradition. From 1979 to 1989 he was the Dalai Lama's chief interpreter into English and he played a significant role in the development of the Free Tibet Movement. In 2006 he published his English translation of a major work by the Jonangpa lama, Dolpopa, on the Buddha Nature and Emptiness called Mountain Doctrine. Hopkins died on July 1, 2024, at the age of 83. He graduated from Harvard College (BA) and the University of Wisconsin-Madison (PhD).

== Works ==
- Lati Rinpoche; Hopkins, Jeffrey (1980). Death, Intermediate State and Rebirth. Rider & Co. ISBN 0091393213.
- Maps of the Profound: Jam-Yang-Shay-Ba's Great Exposition of Buddhist and Non-Buddhist Views on the Nature of Reality
- Tsong-kha-pa's Final Exposition of Wisdom
- Emptiness Yoga: The Tibetan Middle Way
- Emptiness in the Mind-Only School of Buddhism
- Meditation on Emptiness
- Absorption in No External World: 170 Issues in Mind-Only Buddhism (Dynamic Responses to Dzong-ka-ba's the Essence of Eloquence)
- Mountain Doctrine: Tibet's Fundamental Treatise on Other-Emptiness and the Buddha Matrix
- The Buddhism of Tibet and the Key to the Middle Way
- The Precious Garland of Advice for the King and the Song of the Four Mindfulness

=== Translations ===
- Health Through Balance: An Introduction to Tibetan Medicine (1986), Yeshi Dhonden, ISBN 978-0937938256
