= LGBTQ rights in Tibet =

Rights of the LGBT community in Tibet

LGBTQ rights in in Tibet
- Tibet Autonomous Region within the People's Republic of China and disputed Tibetan areas controlled by India
- Legal status: Legal (in China since 1997 and in India since 2018)
- Discrimination protections: No

Family rights
- Recognition of relationships: No

Lesbian, gay, bisexual, and transgender (LGBTQ) people in the Tibet encounter specific legal and social challenges not faced by non-LGBT residents. The Tibetan Plateau, spanning areas under the sovereignty of both the People's Republic of China and the Republic of India, has variations in the legal treatment of LGBT individuals between these nations. Since 1997 in China and 2018 in India, all forms of same-sex sexual activities were legalised. However, in both nations, same-sex couples lack the rights to marry or adopt children, and there is no provision for common law marriages, same-sex marriage, civil unions, or issue partnership certificates.

In India, same-sex couples have limited rights to cohabitation. In China, no explicit legal protections against discrimination for LGBT individuals, nor does it have hate crime laws that encompass sexual orientation or gender identity.

Within the Tibetan cultural context, no specific Tibetan support groups for LGBT individuals are reported. However, Han Chinese residents in Tibet have established community structures, such as LGBT-friendly bars. Interviews conducted by a Singapore-based Asian gay website state that Tibetan youth generally exhibit a relaxed attitude towards homosexuality. The cultural norm in Tibet discourages any public displays of affection, a stance influenced partly by Buddhism's glorification on celibacy, rather than a direct manifestation of homophobia.

The historical account of Ernst Schäfer’s 1938–39 German expedition to Tibet notes the presence of homosexual relationships, particularly between older lamas and younger boys, highlighting the role of homosexuality in the region's socio-political fabric. There are pages of careful observation of Himalayan people engaged in a variety of intimate acts.

Tenzin Mariko, a former Buddhist monk from Dharamshala, is recognized as the first openly transgender woman within the Tibetan community. She has actively engaged with Tibetan social organizations and has been received by religious leaders, marking a significant step towards visibility and acceptance of transgender individuals in Tibetan society.

== See also ==
- LGBT topics and Buddhism
- LGBT rights in China
- LGBT rights in India
- Buddhism and sexuality
- Buddhism and sexual orientation (Tibet)
- Same-sex marriage in China
