= Bodhi Magazine =

- the 17th Gyalwa Karmapa on the cover of Bodhi Magazine
- Editor in Chief: Cindy Shelton
- Categories: Buddhist Magazine
- Frequency: Quarterly
- Publisher: The Dzogchen Ponlop Rinpoche
- Founder: Dzogchen Ponlop Rinpoche
- Founded: 1997
- First issue: Fall 1997
- Country: United States
- Based in: Seattle, Washington
- Language: English
- Website: http://www.bodhionline.com/

Bodhi Magazine (ISBN 1-929046-05-7) is a 72-page internationally distributed full-color glossy format Buddhist periodical that is issued on a quarterly basis. It is based in Seattle. First printed in 1997, its content is created by and for Nyingma and Kagyu sanghas. It was founded by Dzogchen Ponlop Rinpoche. Snow Lion Publications has dubbed the magazine "the voice of Nalandabodhi in Seattle", as it features many articles, songs, and poems by the renowned tulkus Dzogchen Ponlop Rinpoche, Khenpo Tsultrim Gyamtso Rinpoche, and the 17th Gyalwa Karmapa, as well as from other teachers associated with the Nalandabodhi sangha.
