= Hartford Street Zen Center =

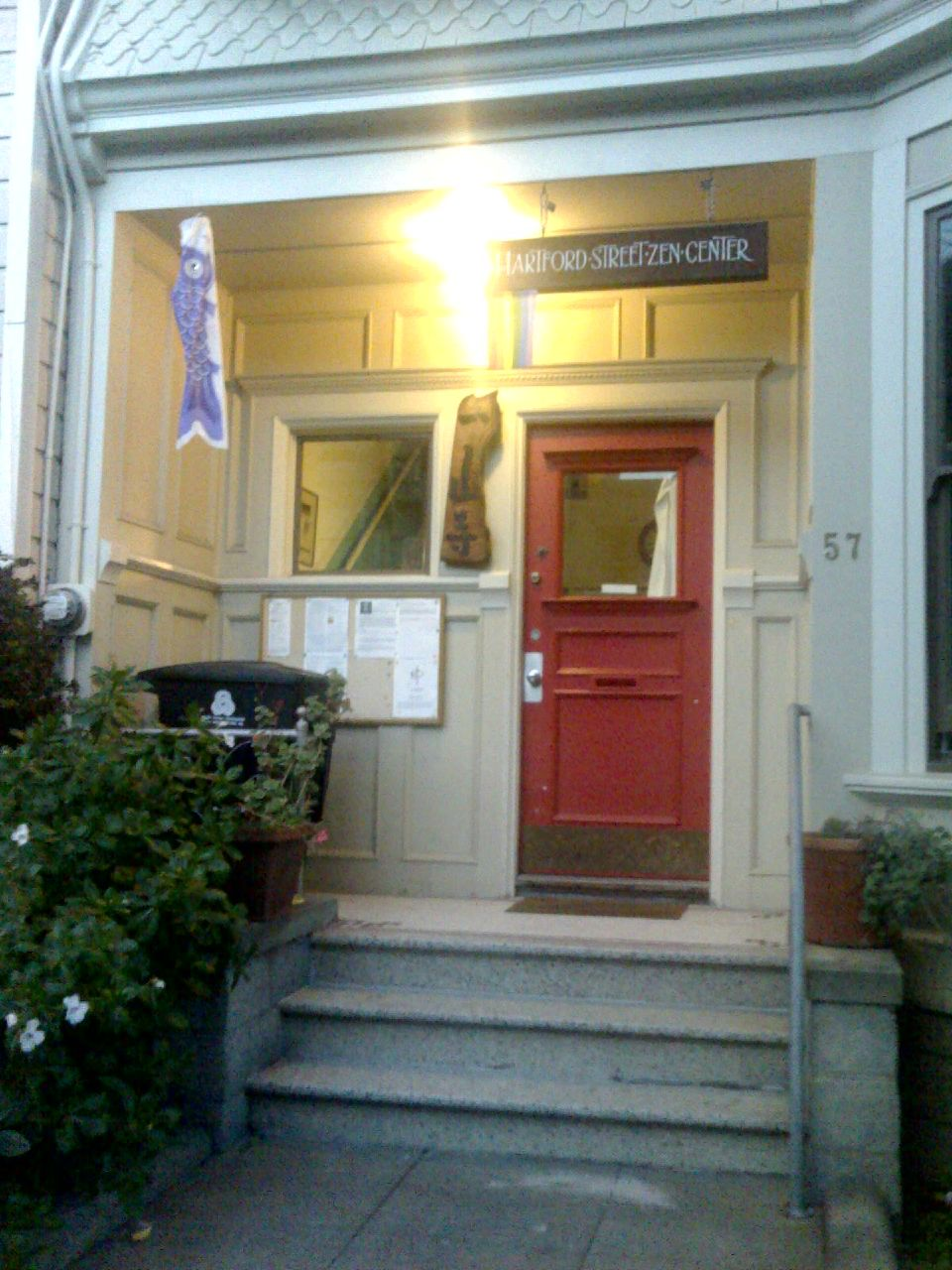

Religion
- Affiliation: Soto Zen, Shunryu Suzuki lineage

Location
- Location: 57 Hartford Street; San Francisco, California 94114
- Country: United States
- Interactive map of Hartford Street Zen Center

Architecture
- Founder: Issan Tommy Dorsey
- Completed: 1989

Website
- www.hszc.org/

The Hartford Street Zen Center, temple name Issan-ji (literally 'One Mountain Temple'), is a Soto Zen practice-center located in the Castro district of San Francisco.

== History ==
Issan Dorsey (a former drug-addict and drag queen) brought the center from its early beginnings as The Gay Buddhist Club of 1980 to the modern-day Hartford Street Zen Center (HSZC), becoming Abbot there in 1989. In 1987 the group had opened the Maitri Hospice for those dying of AIDS, to which Dorsey himself succumbed in 1990. It was the first Buddhist hospice of its kind in the United States. For a time the center leased a building next door to house the sick, eventually offering nine hospice-beds for persons in extremis . The second Abbot was Kijun Steve Allen, who departed after a difficult tenure of one year. In 1991 famed Beat-era poet Zenshin Philip Whalen assumed the abbacy, until ill health obliged him to retire in 1996; he died in 2002. By 1997 the hospice had outgrown the Hartford Street location and was moved to a new, custom-designed facility at Church and Duboce Streets in San Francisco with space for fifteen residents. Meanwhile, practice continued at Issan-ji under the guidance of Rev. Ottmar Engel, who served as Practice-Leader until health-concerns necessitated his return to his native Germany in 2001. After an interregnum, during which the Board of Directors, assisted by Rev. John King, took care of things at Hartford Street, Rev. Myo Denis Lahey, who was completing a tenure as Prior (Tanto) at Tassajara Zen Mountain Center in Carmel Valley, California, was invited to be Practice-Leader, and as of October 2013 was installed as HSZC's current Abbot.

== See also ==
- Buddhism in the United States
- Buddhism and sexual orientation
- San Francisco Zen Center
- Timeline of Zen Buddhism in the United States
