= Buddhist view of marriage =

Buddhist perspectives on the tradition of marriage

Korean bride's robe

Buddhism considers marriage a secular affair and as such, it is not considered a sacrament. Buddhists are expected to follow the civil laws regarding marriage laid out by their respective governments.

While the ceremony itself is civil, many Buddhists obtain the blessing from monks at the local temple after the marriage is completed.

== History ==
Gautama Buddha never spoke against marriage but instead pointed out some of the difficulties of marriage. He is quoted in the Parabhava Sutta as saying:

Not to be contented with one's own wife, and to be seen with harlots and the wives of others—this is a cause of one's downfall. Being past one's youth, to take a young wife and to be unable to sleep for jealousy of her—this is a cause of one's downfall.

== Views ==
While Buddhism may neither encourage nor discourage getting married, it does provide principles regarding it.

In the Sigalovada Sutta (Digha Nikaya 31), Gautama Buddha advised husbands to honor and respect their wives, be faithful, and share authority in managing household affairs. Similarly, wives were encouraged to perform their duties well, be hospitable to relatives, and be faithful and industrious.

=== In Tibetan Buddhism ===
The Dalai Lama has spoken of the merits of marriage:

Too many people in the West have given up on marriage. They don't understand that it is about developing a mutual admiration of someone, deep respect and trust, and awareness of another human's needs ... The new easy-come, easy-go relationships give us more freedom—but less contentment.

== Same Sex Marriage ==
The Pali Canon (the standard collection of scriptures in the Theravada Buddhist tradition, as preserved in the Pāli language, and the most complete extant early Buddhist canon) bars both female and male monastics from both homosexual and heterosexual activities.

Among Buddhists there is a wide diversity of opinion about homosexuality and gay marriage. According to the Pāli Canon and Āgama (the Early Buddhist scriptures), there is not any saying that same-sex or opposite sex relations have anything to do with sexual misconduct. Scholars argue that early Buddhism did not see sexual orientation as a moral issue and that tolerance aligns with core values of Buddhism as a whole. As such, Buddhist attitudes towards homosexuality are often a reflection of local culture rather than Buddhist teachings. The history of homosexuality in Buddhist societies includes cultures of acceptance and non-acceptance in different locations and times.

=== Opposition ===
The Dalai Lama once stated:

From a Buddhist point of view, physical touching between men-to-men and women-to-women is generally considered sexual misconduct.

However, the Dalai Lama later clarified his position stating gay marriage is "OK", provided it's not in contradiction with the values of one's chosen religion. Some contemporary Buddhists oppose or opposed same-sex marriage including Chan master Hsuan Hua.

=== Support ===
Some of the first gay marriages of the modern period were performed by Buddhists. The first known modern Buddhist same-sex marriage took place in the early 1970s through the Buddhist Church of San Francisco part of the Shin Tradition. Prominent contemporary supporters of the rights of the rights of gay and lesbians include Nalandabodhi sangha who has stated that they are welcoming of all sexual orientations and well-known Bhutanese lama Khyentse Norbu has expressed support for LGBT rights in Bhutan. Hsing Yun, founder of the Fo Guang Shan Buddhist order, has called for tolerance towards the LGBT community. The Plum Village Tradition founded by founded by Thích Nhất Hạnh and Chân Không formally accepts LGBT individuals starting an initiative called "The Rainbow Family".

Heavily Buddhist Taiwan legalized same-sex marriage in 2019 with the prominent support of Buddhist Nun Chao-hwei Shih. Nepal, a country with relatively significant Buddhist influences, legalized Same-sex marriage on 24 April 2024. Heavily Buddhist Thailand legalized same-sex marriage in 2024. Same-sex marriages are also performed in places where it is not yet recognized, for example, same-sex marriages are performed at Shunkō-in, a Rinzai Zen Buddhist temple in Kyoto and Shozenji Temple in Moriguchi City, Osaka. The Buddhist Church of San Francisco first performed a gay marriage ceremony in the 1970s while American Soka Gakkai Buddhists have performed same-sex union ceremonies since the 1990s. There has also been support for same-sex marriage from the European Buddhist Union the Buddhist Churches of America, many Shin Buddhist groups, and The Federation of Australian Buddhist Councils (FABC) in Australia.

== Divorce ==
Since marriage is secular, Buddhism has no restrictions on divorce. Ven. K. Sri Dhammananda has said "if a husband and wife really cannot live together, instead of leading a miserable life and harboring more jealousy, anger and hatred, they should have the liberty to separate and live peacefully."

== See also ==
- Bahá'í marriage
- Buddhism and sexual orientation
- Buddhism and romantic relationships
- Buddhism and sexuality
- Christian views on marriage
- Interfaith marriage
- Jewish views on marriage
- List of religions and spiritual traditions
- Marriage in Hinduism
