= Caitriona Reed =

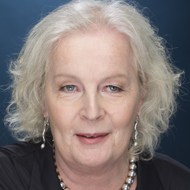
- Born: Christopher Reed; 1949 (age 76–77); Los Angeles, California
- Occupations: Public speaker, seminar leader, hypnotherapist, performance coach, meditation and zen teacher
- Partner: Michele Benzamin-Miki
- Website: FiveChanges.com

Caitriona Reed (born 1949) is an American sensei of Thiền Zen Buddhism who also has a background in Vipassanā meditation. She co-founded Ordinary Dharma in Los Angeles, California; the rural Manzanita Village Retreat Center, located in San Diego County; and Five Changes, to mentor aspiring leaders, cultural creatives, and spiritual visionaries. Reed, a member of the American Zen Teachers Association, led retreats and workshops in Vipassana, Deep Ecology, and Buddhism 1981–2008. She received authority to teach Zen from Thich Nhat Hanh in 1992.

She is a 'woman of transsexual experience' who transitioned in 1996. She stated about her transitioning, "As a teacher encouraging others to live more honest and authentic lives, it was increasingly difficult for me to deny a basic fact—that I was a woman."

Currently, informed by her work as a Buddhist teacher, Reed focuses on public speaking; mentoring individual clients; and together with her partner Michele Benzamin-Miki conducting professional certification training in neuro-linguistic programming and hypnotherapy with an emphasis holistic approaches to life-coaching and personal and professional mentorship.

== Personal life ==
Reed is a trans woman, publicly identifying as transgender in April 1998. Although this was the first time she publicly came out, Reed stated close friends had known for around twenty years.

Prior to her transition Reed married her long-time partner (since 1981) artist, Aikido and Iaido Sensei Michele Benzamin-Miki. They continue living and working together.

== Published Essays ==
- Dharma Gaia: A Harvest of Essays in Buddhism and Ecology (Alan Hunt Badiner, Editor)
- What Makes A Man: 22 Writers Imagine The Future (2004) (Rebecca Walker, Editor)
- The Hidden Lamp: Stories from Twenty-Five Centuries of Awakened Women (2012) (Florence Caplow and Susan Moon, Editors)

== See also ==
- Buddhism in the United States
- Buddhism and sexual orientation
- Timeline of Zen Buddhism in the United States
- Neuro-linguistic programming
