= Nītārtha Institute =

Nītārtha Institute is a school of advanced Buddhist studies for Western students designed based upon the traditional Tibetan monastic university curriculum. Its teachers include the published translator Karl Brunnhölzl, as well as the head of Nalandabodhi, The Dzogchen Ponlop Rinpoche.
