= Issan Dorsey =

American Soto Zen Buddhist

- Title: Roshi

Personal life
- Born: Tommy Dorsey Jr. March 7, 1933 Santa Barbara, California, U.S.
- Died: September 6, 1990 (aged 57) San Francisco, California, U.S.

Religious life
- Religion: Buddhism
- School: Sōtō

Senior posting
- Teacher: Shunryu Suzuki; Zentatsu Richard Baker
- Based in: Hartford Street Zen Center
- Successor: Steven Allen

Issan Dorsey (March 7, 1933 — September 6, 1990), born Tommy Dorsey Jr., was a Sōtō Zen monk and teacher, Dharma heir of Zentatsu Richard Baker and onetime abbot of Hartford Street Zen Center (HSZC) located in the Castro district of San Francisco, California. Earlier in his life, he had worked as a prostitute and a drag queen, and had struggled at times with drug addiction. He died of complications from AIDS in 1990.

He established the Maitri Hospice at HSZC for students and friends dying of AIDS during the spread of the epidemic in the 1980s—the first Buddhist hospice of its kind in the United States. Numbers of his students and colleagues have observed that Dorsey was the embodiment of a bodhisattva.

== Biography ==
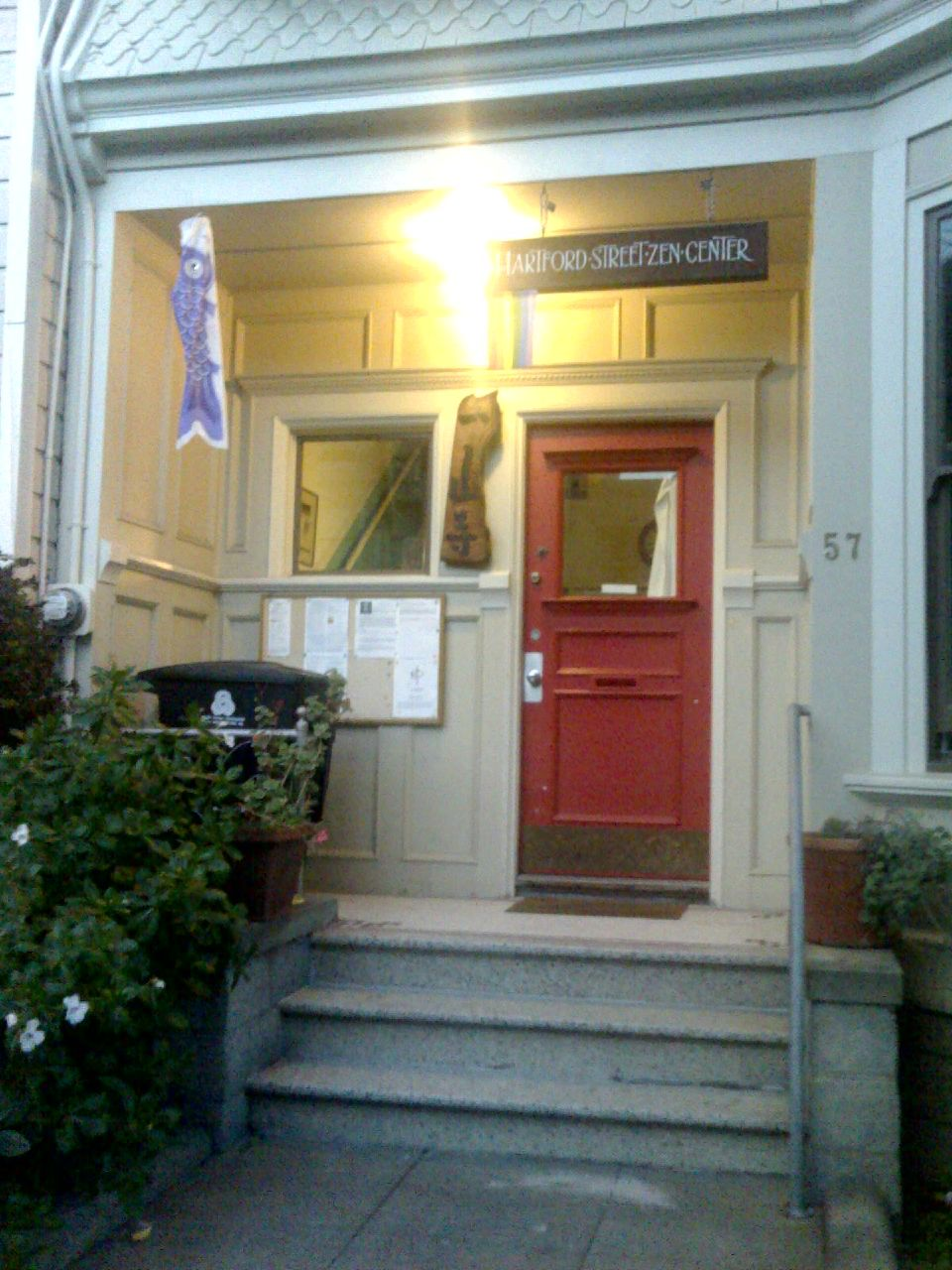
Hartford Street Zen Center

Issan Dorsey was born as Tommy Dorsey Jr. in Santa Barbara, California in 1933. He was raised as a Catholic and was the youngest child of ten siblings. As a boy, he aspired to become an entertainer and studied dance and piano. While in junior college, he became dissatisfied with his life, so he left school and joined the U.S. Navy. In the military, he was able to fulfill his childhood dream of being an entertainer, putting on shows at his base and on television shows. During the Korean War, Dorsey and a male lover were expelled from the Navy, leaving him to spend several years in and out of employment. He finally settled into a job as a waiter for a bar in North Beach, eventually becoming a performer there as a drag queen. His shows were a success and he traveled in a road show known as The Party of Four. On the road in the 1950s, he would sometimes work as a prostitute at shows and afterhours, developing a nasty methamphetamine addiction during this period. On the road during his shows Dorsey was introduced as, "Tommy Dee, the boy who looks like the girl next door."

In the 1960s, he returned to San Francisco, where he continued to shoot speed and engaged in dealing drugs on lower Haight Street. He founded his own commune and also managed a rock band. During this period, he had a spiritual experience under the influence of LSD while observing a photograph of Ramana Maharshi. He constructed an altar with Maharshi's photograph, where he would shoot speed and gaze at the picture for several hours. Soon, he gave up using drugs and started sitting zazen at the San Francisco Zen Center (SFZC) under the guidance of Shunryu Suzuki. In 1980 (while Dorsey was director of SFZC) he became a member of The Gay Buddhist Club, which eventually became known as the Hartford Street Zen Center (HSZC). Originally a discussion group for gay Buddhists, the group eventually began sitting zazen in the basement of one member's house at 57 Hartford Street. In 1987, Dorsey had created a hospice (Maitri Hospice) within the Zen center on Hartford Street, serving primarily gay men who were dying of AIDS. Eventually, Dorsey was made a Sōtō priest by his teacher—Zentatsu Richard Baker—installed as abbot of HSZC in 1989 and given the Dharma name Issan (meaning "One-Mountain"). Shortly before death, in particularly poor health, Issan was recognized as a roshi. On September 6, 1990, Issan Dorsey died of complications linked to AIDS.

== See also ==
- Buddhism in the United States
- Buddhism and sexual orientation
- Timeline of Zen Buddhism in the United States
