= Buddhism and romantic relationships =

Perspective of Buddhism on romantic relationships

Buddhism emphasizes nonattachment and acceptance in various aspects of life, including romantic relationships. Adherents are encouraged to release rigid expectations of an ideal partner and to cultivate unconditional acceptance, reducing potential suffering. By practicing nonattachment and embracing a partner without judgment, followers aim to achieve personal fulfillment and progress on the path to enlightenment.

== Divorce ==
Buddhism states that to avoid divorce, older men should not have younger wives and older women should not have younger husbands. This originates from a belief that the age difference would make the couple incompatible and lead to divorce.

== See also ==
- Buddhist view of marriage
- Buddhism and sexual orientation
- Buddhism and sexuality
