= Shenpen Hookham =

English Buddhist teacher

Susan Kathryn Hookham (née Rowan), known as Lama Shenpen Hookham is a Buddhist teacher who has trained for over 50 years in the Mahamudra and Dzogchen traditions of Tibetan Buddhism.

== Biography ==
Lama Shenpen was born Susan Kathryn Rowan in Essex, England, in 1946. She first encountered Buddhism while studying Geography and Sociology at Reading University, where she became secretary of the University Buddhist Society and had early encounters with Sangharakshita and Chögyam Trungpa Rinpoche amongst others.

In the early 1970s, on the advice of Chögyam Trungpa Rinpoche, Lama Shenpen went to India where she lived as a nun for six years, ordained by the 16th Karmapa. There she studied and meditated in retreat under the guidance of Tibetan teachers such as Karma Thinley Rinpoche, Bokar Rinpoche and Kalu Rinpoche. Rangjung Rigpe Dorje, the 16th Karmapa and head of the Kagyu tradition of Tibetan Buddhism, subsequently instructed her to return to the West to teach Mahamudra.

She met her main teacher, Khenpo Tsultrim Gyamtso Rinpoche, in Europe, and he encouraged her to teach and transmit Mahamudra, the innermost teachings of the Kagyu tradition. On her later return to England, she met and married Rigdzin Shikpo Rinpoche (Michael Hookham), an early pupil of Chögyam Trungpa Rinpoche and Dharma Director of the Longchen Foundation (formerly the Chöd Group) since its inception in 1975.

Lama Shenpen is fluent in Tibetan and was the translator for many Tibetan teachers, including Gendun Rinpoche.

In 1986 Shenpen K. Hookham was awarded Doctor of Philosophy at Oxford University, for her thesis "Tathāgatagarbha doctrine according to the gZhan stong interpretation of the Ratnagotravibhāga".

In 2020 Lama Shenpen's autobiography Keeping the Dalai Lama Waiting & Other Stories - An English Woman's Journey to Becoming a Buddhist Lama was published, which describes her introduction to Buddhism, her time in India with her teachers, and her path to becoming a lama. The book has had many recommendations from other esteemed teachers, including Khandro Rinpoche and Ringu Tulku Rinpoche.

== Awakened Heart Sangha ==
Shenpen is the Spiritual Director of the Awakened Heart Sangha, and spends most of her time in semi-retreat at the Hermitage of the Awakened Heart (Fortress of Enlightenment – Changchub Dzong), her home and the retreat centre in North Wales, United Kingdom. She has students worldwide who are studying her Living the Awakened Heart Training, a structured learning programme in meditation, reflection and insight, devised especially for Westerners, to transmit the most profound teachings of Mahamudra and Dzogchen in an accessible, experiential way. Regular teaching days, meditation and study retreats are held at the Hermitage. According to Shenpen:

Some places act as a strong focus for us to connect to the spiritual realm [...] H.H. Dilgo Khyentse Rinpoche, one of my teachers, told us that North West Wales was a special area and that establishing a place here devoted to spiritual practice would be of great benefit for generations to come. So that's what we did, and I really hope that the people of Wales will feel a connection with it, even if they are not Buddhists.

Under Lama Shenpen's guidance, in 2011 the Awakened Heart Sangha built an enlightenment stupa at the Fortress of Enlightenment (Changchub Dzong), the Hermitage at Ynys Graianog, Criccieth, Gwynedd, in North Wales containing a small stupa consecrated by Khenpo Tsultrim Gyamtso Rinpoche. Lama Phuntsok from Nepal directed the construction and came to consecrate it formally in October of that year.

Khenpo Rinpoche and Rigdzin Shikpo Rinpoche have subsequently encouraged Lama Shenpen to develop her teaching activity further, and she is the author of the distant learning (online and in person) teaching programme Living the Awakened Heart Training, which includes the structured, experience-based courses 'Discovering the Heart of Buddhism' and 'Trusting the Heart of Buddhism'.

== Works and translations ==
=== Works ===
- S. K. Hookham: 'The Buddha Within: Tathagatagarbha Doctrine According to the Shentong Interpretation of the Ratnagotravibhaga', SUNY Press, (1991) ISBN 0791403572
- Lama Shenpen Hookham: 'There's More to Dying than Death, a Buddhist Perspective', Windhorse Publications (2006) ISBN 1899579680
- Lama Shenpen Hookham: 'The Guru Principle: A Guide to the Teacher-Student Relationship in Buddhism', Shambhala Publications (2021) ISBN 9781611809268
- Lama Shenpen Hookham: 'Keeping The Dalai Lama Waiting & Other Stories: An English Woman's Journey to Becoming a Buddhist Lama', Independently published (2020) ISBN 9798617593411

=== Editor ===
- Rigdzin Shikpo & Shenpen K. Hookham (ed): 'Openness Clarity Sensitivity', Longchen Foundation, Wisdom Books, (2000) ISBN 978-0-9511477-3-3

=== Translations ===
- Khenpo Tsultrim Gyamtso Rinpoche, translated and arranged by Shenpen Hookham: 'Progressive Stages of Meditation on Emptiness', Zhyisil Chokyi Ghatsal Publications (2001)
