= Buddhism and sexuality =

Relation between Buddhist theory and practice and sexuality

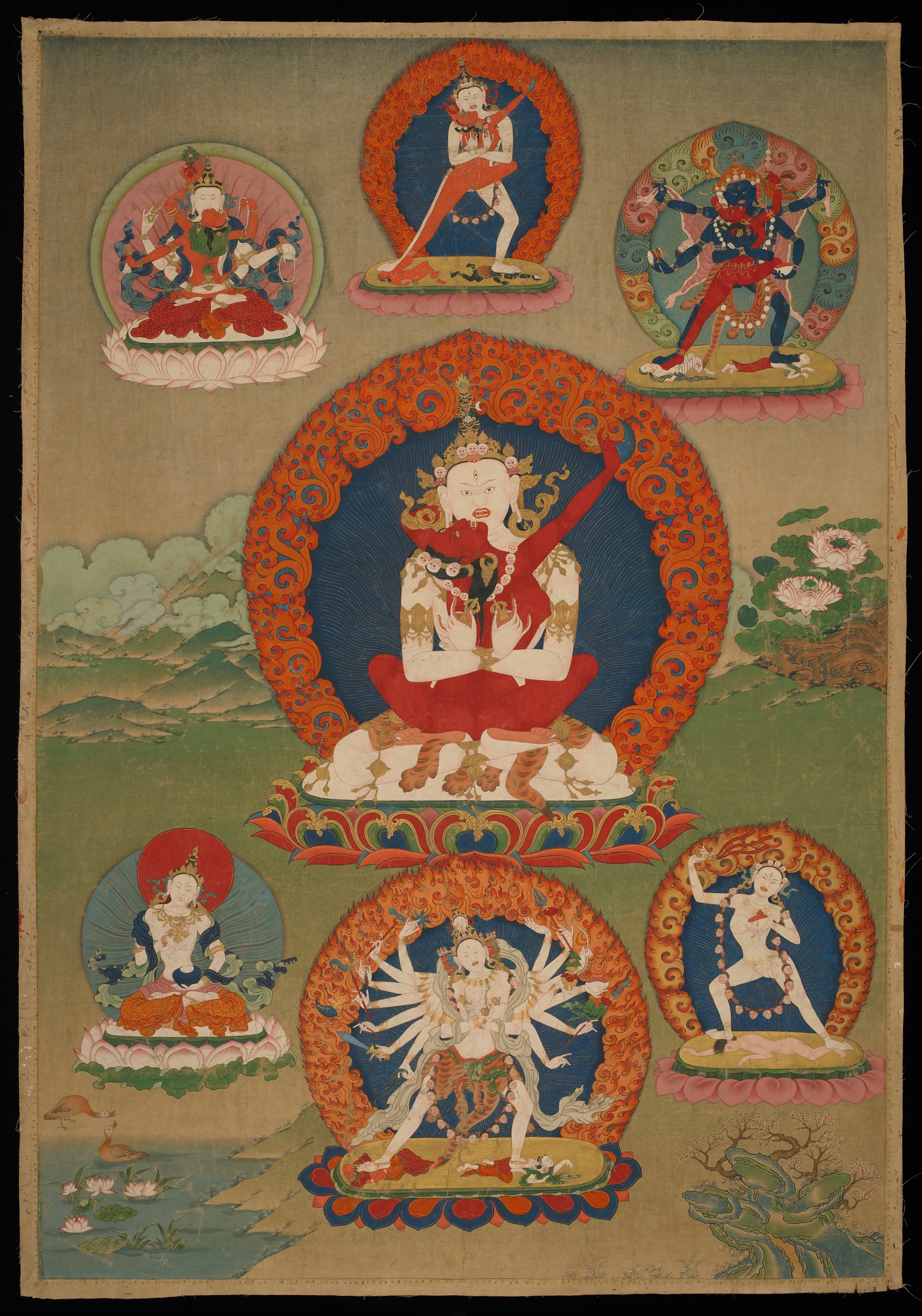
18th century depiction of the Yab-Yum, a Tibetan Buddhist motif of the creation of the universe as a sexual union between male and female primordial forces

Buddhism categorizes sexuality, in particular sexual arousal and pleasure, as a type of kama, or earthly pleasure, that must be abandoned to achieve enlightenment. Unlike other world religions, many Buddhists avoid drawing a distinction between monastic sexual abstinence and other forms of religious self-discipline, while some traditions actively incorporate sexual concepts or acts in a yogic or ritualistic context.

== Scripture ==
In the Buddha's first discourse, he identifies craving (tanha) as the cause of suffering (dukkha). He then identifies three objects of craving: the craving for existence; the craving for non-existence and the craving for sense pleasures (kama). Kama is identified as one of five hindrances to the attainment of jhana according to the Buddha's teaching. Throughout the Sutta Pitaka the Buddha often compares sexual pleasure to arrows or darts. So in the Kama Sutta (4.1) from the Sutta Nipata the Buddha explains that craving sexual pleasure is a cause of suffering.

If one, longing for sensual pleasure, achieves it, yes, he's enraptured at heart. The mortal gets what he wants. But if for that person — longing, desiring — the pleasures diminish, he's shattered, as if shot with an arrow.

The Buddha then goes on to say:

So one, always mindful, should avoid sensual desires. Letting them go, he will cross over the flood like one who, having bailed out the boat, has reached the far shore.

The 'flood' refers to the deluge of human suffering. The 'far shore' is nirvana, a state in which there is no sensual desire.

The meaning of the Kama Sutta is that sensual desire, like any habitual sense pleasure, brings suffering. To lay people the Buddha advised that they should at least avoid sexual misconduct (See Theravada definition below). From the Buddha's full-time disciples, the ordained monks and nuns, strict celibacy (called brahmacarya) had always been required.

== Contemporary overview ==
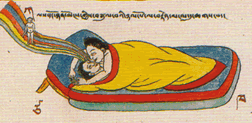
Buddhist illustration of intercourse and conception as the beginning stage of the soul's journey to rebirth

Former Vice President of the Buddhist Society and Chairman of the English Sangha Trust, Maurice Walshe, wrote an essay called 'Buddhism and Sex' in which he presented Buddha's essential teaching on human sexuality and its relationship to the goal (nibbana). The third of the five precepts states:

Kamesu micchacara veramani sikkhapadam samadiyami,

The literal meaning of this statement is, "I undertake the course of training in refraining from wrong-doing in respect of sensuality." Walshe comments,

There is, in the Buddhist view, nothing uniquely wicked about sexual offenses or failings. Those inclined to develop a guilt-complex about their sex-life should realize that failure in this respect is neither more, nor, on the other hand, less serious than failure to live up to any other precept. In point of fact, the most difficult precept of all for nearly everybody to live up to is the fourth — to refrain from all forms of wrong speech (which often includes uncharitable comments on other people's real or alleged sexual failings!)...What precisely, then, does the Third Precept imply for the ordinary lay Buddhist? Firstly, in common with all the other precepts, it is a rule of training. It is not a "commandment" from God, the Buddha, or anyone else saying: "Thou shalt not..." There are no such commandments in Buddhism. It is an undertaking by you to yourself, to do your best to observe a certain type of restraint, because you understand that it is a good thing to do. This must be clearly understood. If you don't think it is a good thing to do, you should not undertake it. If you do think it is a good thing to do, but doubt your ability to keep it, you should do your best, and probably, you can get some help and instruction to make it easier. If you feel it is a good thing to attempt to tread the Buddhist path, you may undertake this and the other precepts, with sincerity, in this spirit.

The Buddha's teaching arises out of a wish for others to be free from dukkha. According to the doctrine he taught, freedom from suffering involves freedom from sexual desires and the training (Pali: sikkha) to get rid of the craving involves to a great extent abstaining from those desires.

== Monastic Buddhism ==
Those who practice Buddhism as ordained monks and nuns are strictly mandated to remain celibate. Japanese schools of Buddhism are sometimes erroneously regarded as an "exception". Modern Japanese clergy cannot be considered "monks" in any true sense, as they undergo no ordination under the Vinaya.

=== Mainstream views ===
Sex is seen as a serious monastic transgression. Within Theravada Buddhism there are four principal transgressions which entail expulsion from the monastic Sangha: sex, theft, murder, and falsely boasting of superhuman perfections. Sexual misconduct for monks and nuns includes masturbation. In the case of monasticism, abstaining completely from sex is seen as a necessity in order to reach enlightenment. The Buddha's criticism of a monk who broke his celibate vows—without having disrobed first—is as follows:

Worthless man, [sexual intercourse] is unseemly, out of line, unsuitable, and unworthy of a contemplative; improper and not to be done... Haven't I taught the Dhamma in many ways for the sake of dispassion and not for passion; for unfettering and not for fettering; for freedom from clinging and not for clinging? Yet here, while I have taught the Dhamma for dispassion, you set your heart on passion; while I have taught the Dhamma for unfettering, you set your heart on being fettered; while I have taught the Dhamma for freedom from clinging, you set your heart on clinging.

Worthless man, haven't I taught the Dhamma in many ways for the fading of passion, the sobering of intoxication, the subduing of thirst, the destruction of attachment, the severing of the round, the ending of craving, dispassion, cessation, unbinding? Haven't I in many ways advocated abandoning sensual pleasures, comprehending sensual perceptions, subduing sensual thirst, destroying sensual thoughts, calming sensual fevers? Worthless man, it would be better that your penis be stuck into the mouth of a poisonous snake than into a woman's vagina. It would be better that your penis be stuck into the mouth of a black viper than into a woman's vagina. It would be better that your penis be stuck into a pit of burning embers, blazing and glowing, than into a woman's vagina. Why is that? For that reason you would undergo death or death-like suffering, but you would not on that account, at the break-up of the body, after death, fall into deprivation, the bad destination, the abyss, hell...

Worthless man, this neither inspires faith in the faithless nor increases the faithful. Rather, it inspires lack of faith in the faithless and wavering in some of the faithful.

=== Japanese Buddhism ===
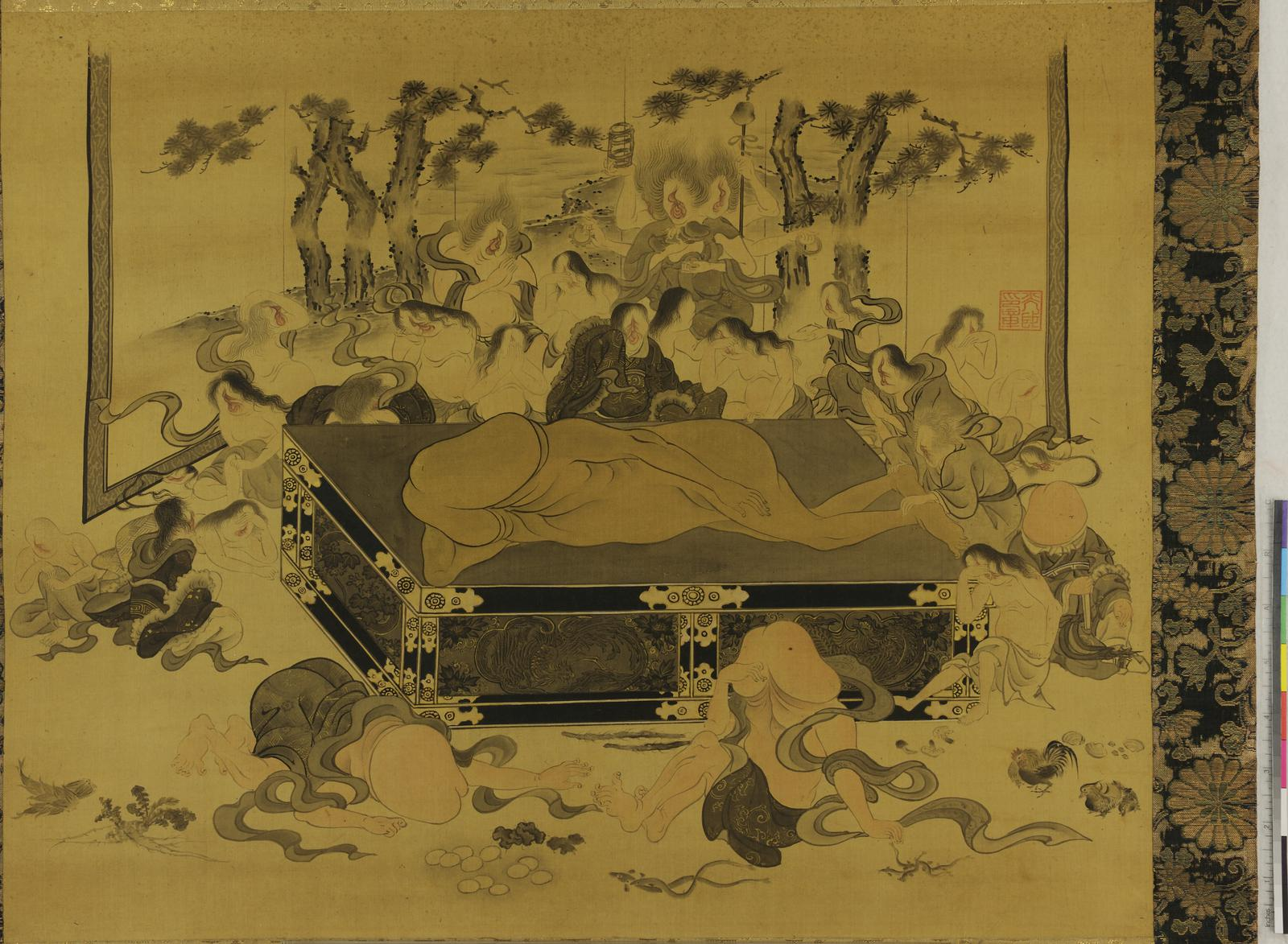
A shunga reimagining of the Death of Buddha in exaggerated sexual terms; Whether such a depiction was intended to express derision or reverence is unknown.

Conversely to most tenets of Buddhism, Japanese Buddhist monks were strongly associated to the partaking of pleasure and sexual relationships. Many of them were known to maintain relationships with prostitutes and geishas, often maintaining long term liaisons with them. While those aspects were a popular target of criticism and satire as charge of moral corruption, both "by Japanese who often were ideologically hostile to Buddhism themselves or by Western observers inclined to view Buddhism as an obstacle to Christian missionary success in Japan", as well as other orthodox Buddhists, some adherents to this lifestyle sometimes claimed it to be actually part of their religious practice. As such, there were currents of local esoteric Buddhism, possibly influenced by non-Buddhist folk tradition, that valued sexuality positively.

The Japanese deva Kangiten, a Buddhicized form of the Hindu god Ganesha, was considered sexually symbolic, being represented as dual figures embracing. It received a wide worship, especially among geishas and people in the business of pleasure, and its esoteric sexuality meant its image had to be usually covered from public eyes. The Wisdom King Rāgarāja, who is believed to help turn sexual desires into paths to enlightenment, has also been historically revered by sex-workers, and is seen as something of a patron among the LGBT people. The 12th century saw the rise of the infamous Tachikawa-ryu sect, an extreme tantric sex school where human skulls and emission of sexual fluids were used in ritual, for which they were later persecuted and suppressed by mainstream Buddhists. Finally, even in non-tantric Buddhism, influential 15th century monk Ikkyū preached for sex and love as valid ways to reach Enlightenment. He is variously considered a heretic or a saint within Zen.

== Lay Buddhism ==
The most common formulation of Buddhist ethics are the Five Precepts and the Eightfold Path, which say that one should neither be attached to nor crave sensual pleasure. These precepts take the form of voluntary, personal undertakings, not divine mandate or instruction. The third of the Five Precepts is "To refrain from committing sexual misconduct.

Celibacy or Brahmacariya rules pertain only to the Eight precepts or the 10 monastic precepts.

According to the Theravada traditions there are some statements attributed to Gautama Buddha on the nature of sexual misconduct. In Everyman's Ethics, a collection of four specific suttas compiled and translated by Narada Thera, it is said that adultery is one of four evils the wise will never praise. Within the Anguttara Nikaya on his teachings to Cunda the Silversmith this scope of misconduct is described: "...one has intercourse with those under the protection of father, mother, brother, sister, relatives or clan, or of their religious community; or with those promised to someone else, protected by law, and even with those betrothed with a garland" (etc.- child/underage)

Bhikkhu Nyanamoli has provided an English Translation of the Majjhima Nikaya 41, "He is given over to misconduct in sexual desires: he has intercourse with such (women) as are protected by the mother, father, (mother and father), brother, sister, relatives, as have a husband, as entail a penalty, and also with those that are garlanded in token of betrothal."

== Sexual yoga ==
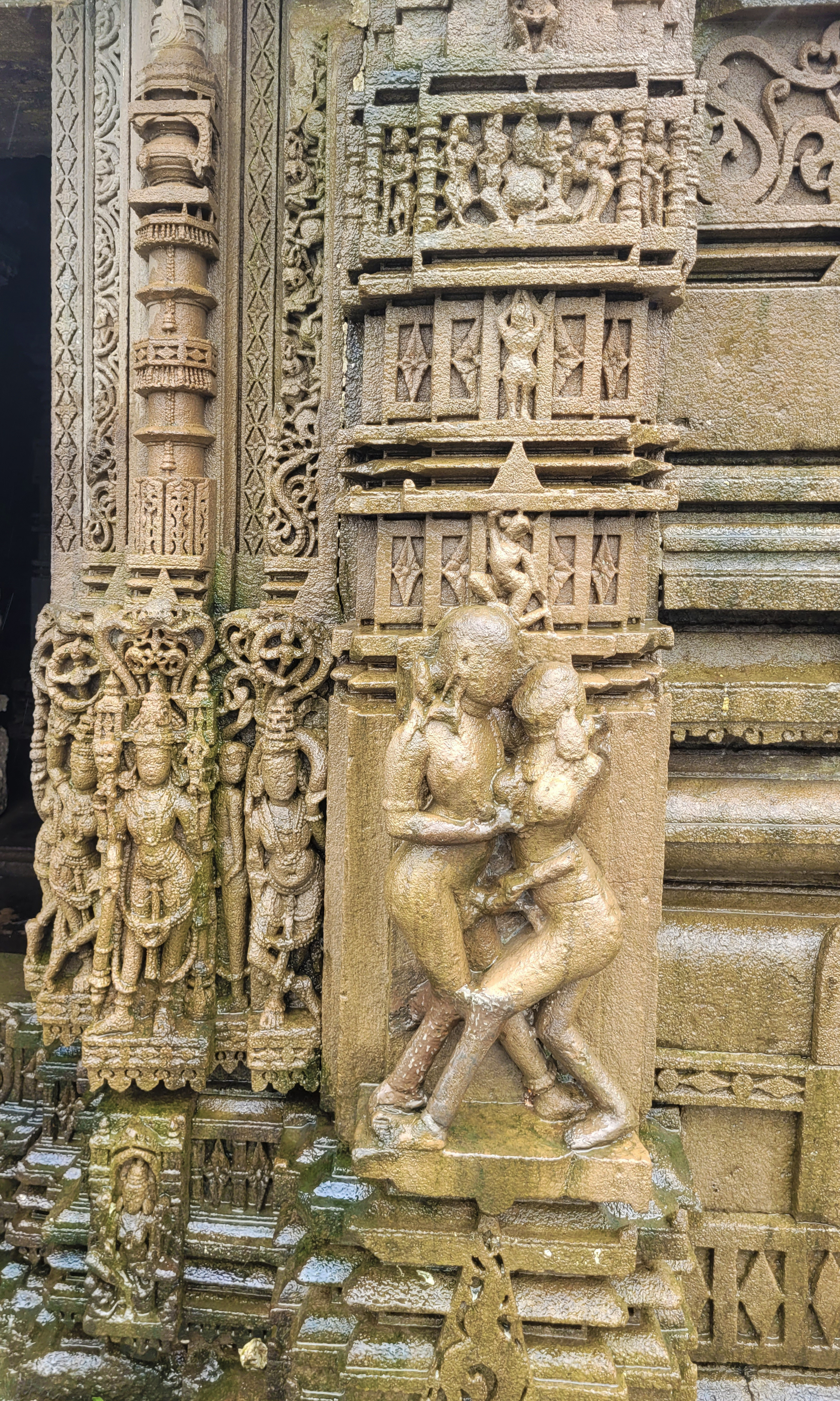
Erotic themes in the carvings of the Amruteshwar Temple

According to some Tibetan authorities, the physical practice of sexual yoga is necessary at the highest level for the attainment of Buddhahood. The use of sexual yoga is highly regulated. It is only permitted after years of training. The physical practice of sexual yoga is and has historically been extremely rare. A great majority of Tibetans believe that the only proper practice of tantric sex is metaphorically, not physically, in rituals and during meditative visualizations. The dominant Gelug sect of Tibetan Buddhism holds that sexual yoga as an actual physical practice is the only way to attain Buddhahood in one lifetime. The founder of the sect Tsongkhapa did not, according to tradition, engage in this practice, but instead attained complete enlightenment at the moment of death, that being according to this school the nearest possible without sexual yoga. The school also taught that they are only appropriate for the most elite practitioners, who had directly realized emptiness and who had unusually strong compassion. The next largest school in Tibet, the Nyingma, holds that this is not necessary to achieve Buddhahood in one lifetime. The fourteenth Dalai Lama of the Gelug sect holds that the practice should only be done as a visualization.

== Homosexuality ==
Among Buddhists there is a wide diversity of opinion about homosexuality. According to the Pāli Canon and Āgama (the Early Buddhist scriptures), there is not any saying that same-sex or opposite sex relations have anything to do with sexual misconduct. Scholars argue that early Buddhism did not see sexual orientation as a moral issue and that tolerance aligns with core values of Buddhism as a whole. As such, Buddhist attitudes towards homosexuality are often a reflection of local culture rather than Buddhist teachings. The history of homosexuality in Buddhist societies includes cultures of acceptance and non-acceptance in different locations and times.

The third of the five precepts admonishes against "sexual misconduct"; however, "sexual misconduct" is a broad term, subject to interpretation according to followers' social norms. Early Buddhism appears to have been silent regarding homosexual relations.

Some Theravada monks express that same-sex relations do not violate the rule to avoid sexual misconduct, which means not having sex with someone underage (thus protected by their parents or guardians), someone betrothed or married and who have taken vows of religious celibacy. Some later traditions feature restrictions on non-vaginal sex, though its situations seem involving coerced sex.

The situation is different for monastics. For them, the Vinaya (code of monastic discipline) bans all sexual activity, but does so in purely physiological terms, making no moral distinctions among the many possible forms of intercourse.

Contemporary conservative Buddhist leaders like Chan master Hsuan Hua have spoken against the act of homosexuality. Some Tibetan Buddhist leaders like the 14th Dalai Lama spoke about the restrictions of how to use one's sex organ to insert into other's body parts based on Je Tsongkhapa's work. However, the Dalai Lama has repeatedly "voiced his support for the full recognition of human rights for all people, regardless of sexual orientation." In the most recent interview with the Dalai Lama on this topic (10 March 2014), the Dalai Lama said gay marriage is "OK", provided it's not in contradiction with the values of one's chosen religion.

Prominent contemporary supporters of the rights of gay and lesbians include Nalandabodhi sangha, who have stated that they are welcoming of all sexual orientations, and well-known Bhutanese lama Khyentse Norbu has expressed support for LGBT rights in Bhutan. Hsing Yun, founder of the Fo Guang Shan Buddhist order, has called for tolerance towards the LGBT community. The Plum Village Tradition founded by founded by Thích Nhất Hạnh and Chân Không formally accepts LGBT individuals starting an initiative called "The Rainbow Family".

Heavily Buddhist Taiwan legalized same-sex marriage in 2019 with the prominent support of the Buddhist Nun Chao-hwei Shih. Nepal, a country with relatively significant Buddhist influences, legalized same-sex marriage on 24th April, 2024, as did Thailand in the same year. Same-sex marriages are also performed in places where it is not yet recognized, for example, same-sex marriages are performed at Shunkō-in, a Rinzai Zen Buddhist temple in Kyoto and Shozenji Temple in Moriguchi City, Osaka. The Buddhist Church of San Francisco first performed a gay marriage ceremony in the 1970s while American Soka Gakkai Buddhists have performed same-sex union ceremonies since the 1990s. There has also been support for same-sex marriage from the European Buddhist Union the Buddhist Churches of America, many Shin Buddhist groups, and The Federation of Australian Buddhist Councils (FABC) in Australia.

As of 2025, Myanmar and Sri Lanka are the only Buddhist-majority countries to still criminalize homosexuality. However, in 2022, Sri Lanka proposed a bill to repeal the colonial-era laws, and the National Unity Government of Myanmar also appointed Aung Myo Min as the human rights minister of the cabinet and the first openly LGBT minister in the country's history. Additionally, Aung San Suu Kyi, the leader of the National League for Democracy, once promised to improve LGBTQ rights in Myanmar.

== See also ==
- Buddhism and romantic relationships
- Buddhism and sexual orientation
- Buddhist ethics
- Buddhist view of marriage
- Nyönpa
- Tachikawa-ryu

== Bibliography ==
- Lang, Karen C. (June 2015). Mittal, Sushil (ed.). "When the Vindhya Mountains Float in the Ocean: Some Remarks on the Lust and Gluttony of Ascetics and Buddhist Monks". International Journal of Hindu Studies. 19 (1/2). Boston: Springer Verlag: 171–192. doi:10.1007/s11407-015-9176-z. eISSN 1574-9282. ISSN 1022-4556. JSTOR 24631797. S2CID 145662113.
- Langenberg, Amy Paris (April 2018). "Buddhism and Sexuality". In Cozort, Daniel; Shields, James Mark (eds.). The Oxford Handbook of Buddhist Ethics. Oxford: Oxford University Press. doi:10.1093/oxfordhb/9780198746140.013.22. ISBN 9780198746140.
- Langenberg, Amy Paris (September 2015). Denison, Brandi (ed.). "Sex and Sexuality in Buddhism: A Tetralemma". Religion Compass. 9 (9). New York: John Wiley & Sons: 277–286. doi:10.1111/rec3.12162. eISSN 1749-8171.
- Powers, John (26 April 2021). "The Body of the Buddha". The Body of the Buddha: The Buddha's Sex Life. Oxford Research Encyclopedia of Religion. Oxford: Oxford University Press. doi:10.1093/acrefore/9780199340378.013.745. ISBN 9780199340378. Archived from the original on 16 May 2021.
