= Dzogchen Ponlop Rinpoche =

Tibetan Buddhist abbot and scholar

- རྫོགས་ཆེན་དཔོན་སློབ་རིན་པོ་ཆེ།
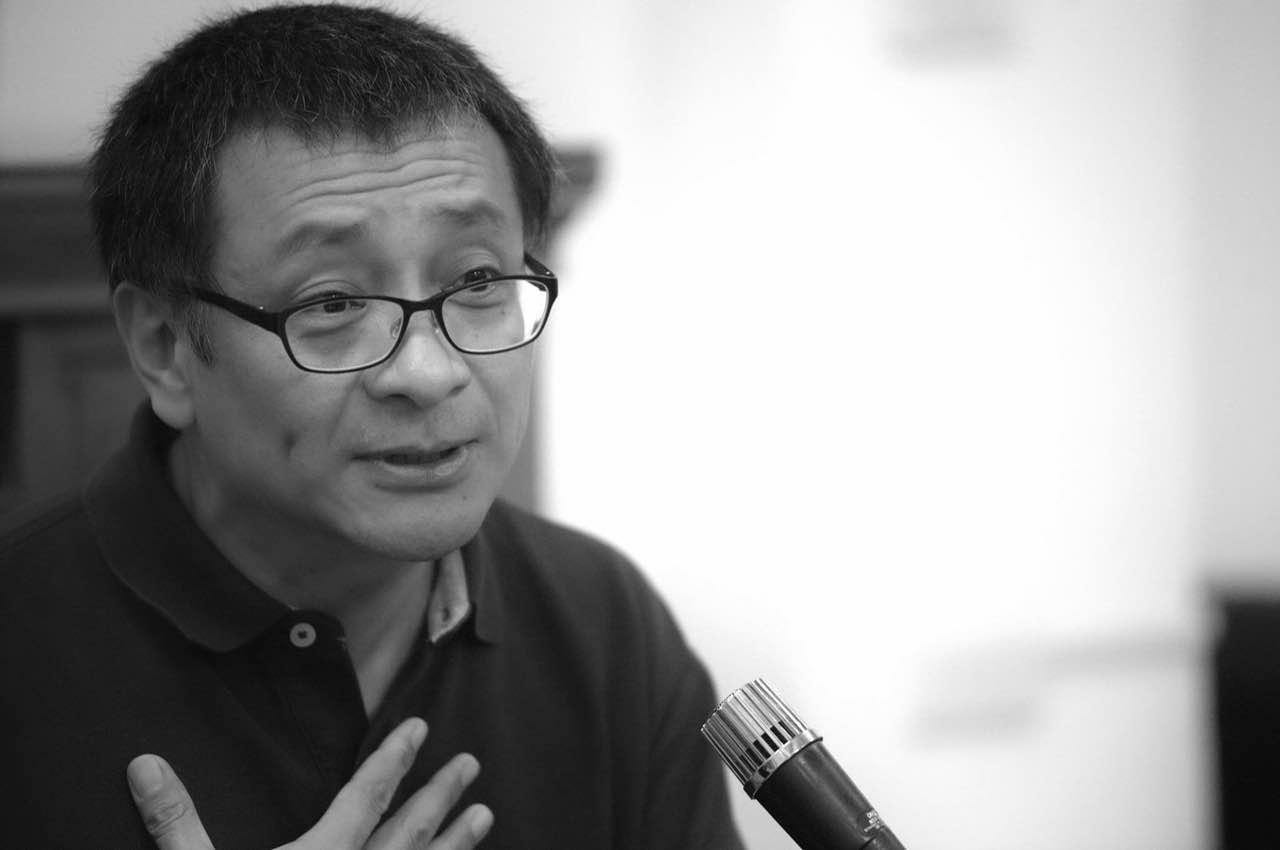
- Title: Rinpoche

Personal life
- Born: Karma Sungrap Ngedon Tenpa Gyaltsen; 1965 (age 60–61) Rumtek Monastery, Sikkim, India
- Spouse: Aya Liu (2014 - present), Amita Gupta (2000 - 2013)
- Children: One daughter (born in 2014)
- Education: Graduate of Karma Shri Nalanda Institute for Higher Buddhist Studies as Ka-rabjampa, degree of Acharya awarded from Sampurnanand Sanskrit University
- Website: dpr.info

Religious life
- Religion: Tibetan Buddhism
- Lineage: Nyingma and Karma Kagyu

Senior posting
- Teacher: Rangjung Rigpe Dorje, 16th Karmapa, Dilgo Khyentse, Alak Zenkar Rinpoche, Khenchen Thrangu Rinpoche, Tulku Urgyen Rinpoche, Kalu Rinpoche, Khenpo Tsultrim Gyamtso Rinpoche
- Based in: Seattle, Washington

The 7th Dzogchen Ponlop (Karma Sungrap Ngedön Tenpa Gyaltsen, born 1965) is an abbot of Dzogchen Monastery, founder and spiritual director of Nalandabodhi, founder of Nītārtha Institute for Higher Buddhist Studies, a leading Tibetan Buddhist scholar, and a meditation master. He is one of the highest tülkus in the Nyingma lineage and an accomplished Karma Kagyu lineage holder.

== Biography ==
Dzogchen Ponlop Rinpoche was born in 1965 at Rumtek Monastery (Dharma Chakra Center) in Sikkim, India. His birth was prophesied by the supreme head of the Kagyu lineage, Rangjung Rigpe Dorje, 16th Karmapa, to Ponlop Rinpoche's parents, Dhamchö Yongdu, the General Secretary of the Sixteenth Gyalwang Karmapa, and his wife, Lekshey Drolma. Upon his birth, he was recognized by the 16th Gyalwang Karmapa as the seventh in the line of Dzogchen Ponlop incarnations and was formally enthroned as the Seventh Dzogchen Ponlop at Rumtek Monastery in 1968.

After receiving Buddhist refuge and bodhisattva vows from the 16th Gyalwang Karmapa, Dzogchen Ponlop was ordained as a novice monk in 1974. He subsequently received full ordination and became a bhikṣu, although he later returned his vows and is now a lay teacher.

Rinpoche received teachings and empowerments from the 16th Gyalwang Karmapa, Dilgo Khyentse, Kalu Rinpoche, Tulku Urgyen Rinpoche, Khenchen Thrangu Rinpoche (chief Abbot of the Kagyu lineage), Alak Zenkar Rinpoche, and Khenpo Tsultrim Gyamtso Rinpoche, his root guru.

Rinpoche began studying Buddhist philosophy at the primary school in Rumtek at age 12. In 1979 (when Rinpoche was fourteen), the 16th Karmapa proclaimed Ponlop Rinpoche to be a heart son of the Gyalwang Karmapa and a holder of his Karma Kagyu lineage. In 1980 on his first trip to the West, he accompanied the Sixteenth Gyalwang Karmapa to Europe, United States, Canada, and Southeast Asia. While serving as the Karmapa's attendant, he also gave dharma teachings and assisted in ceremonial roles during these travels.

In 1981, he entered the monastic college at Rumtek, Karma Shri Nalanda Institute for Higher Buddhist Studies where he studied the fields of Buddhist philosophy, psychology, logic, and debate. During his time at Rumtek, Dzogchen Ponlop Rinpoche worked for the Students' Welfare Union, served as head librarian, and was the chief-editor of the Nalandakirti Journal, an annual publication which brings together Eastern and Western views on Buddhism. Rinpoche graduated in 1990 as Ka-rabjampa from Karma Shri Nalanda Institute for Higher Buddhist Studies in Rumtek Monastery. (Ka-rabjampa means "one with unobstructed knowledge of scriptures", the Kagyu equivalent of the Sakya and Gelug's geshe degree.) He simultaneously earned the degree of Acharya, or Master of Buddhist Philosophy, from Sampurnanand Sanskrit University. Dzogchen Ponlop has also completed studies in English and comparative religion at Columbia University in New York City.

== Works ==
Dzogchen Ponlop Rinpoche is greeted warmly worldwide, known for his speaking skills; as a teacher and prolific author he is well known for his teaching contributions to Bodhi Magazine, Lion's Roar, Buddhadharma, and elsewhere. He has also penned a number of books and articles:

- Dzogchen Ponlop (2016). Emotional Rescue (1st ed.). New York: TarcherPerigee. ISBN 9780399176647.
- Dzogchen Ponlop (2014). Penetrating Wisdom. Snow Lion Publications. ISBN 978-1590304167.
- Dzogchen Ponlop (2010). Rebel Buddha: On the Road to Freedom (1st ed.). Boston: Shambhala Publications. ISBN 978-1590308745.
- Dzogchen Ponlop (2006). Mind Beyond Death. Ithaca, N.Y.: Snow Lion Publications. ISBN 978-1559392761.
- Dzogchen Ponlop (2003). Wild Awakening: The Heart of Mahamudra and Dzogchen. Shambhala Publications. ISBN 978-8174721211.
- 2003: "Brief Histories of the Sixteen Karmapas". in Martin, Michele (2004). Music in the sky : the life, art, and teachings of the 17th Gyalwa Karmapa Ogyen Trinley Dorje (1st Indian ed.). New Delhi: New Age Books. ISBN 978-8178221939.

== Organizations ==
=== Nalandabodhi ===
Dzogchen Ponlop Rinpoche is the founder and spiritual director of Nalandabodhi, an international Buddhist community with centers in multiple countries around the world. Nalandabodhi provides paths of study, meditation, and mindful activity rooted in the Kagyu and Nyingma schools of Vajrayana Buddhism.

=== Nitartha International ===
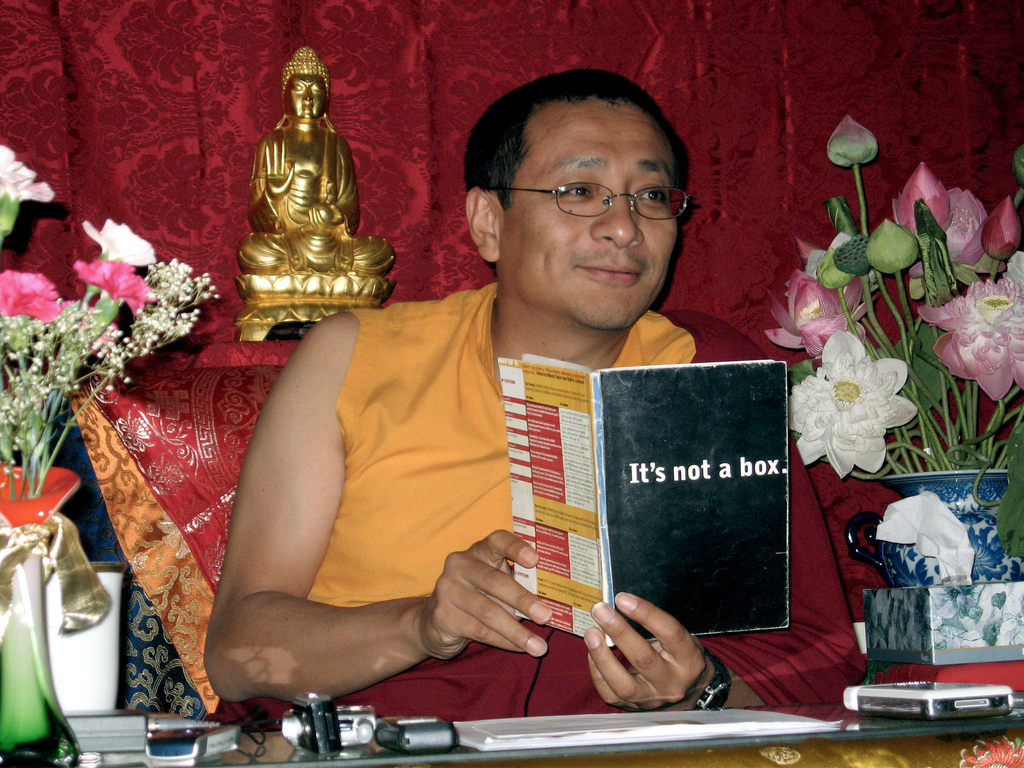
7th Dzogchen Ponlop Rinpoche teaching on 21 October 2007

Nitartha International was founded by Dzogchen Ponlop Rinpoche in 1994. It is the parent organization for several different projects devoted to preserving traditional Buddhist texts, arts, and educational systems. Activities under the umbrella of Nitartha International include Nitartha Institute, the Nitartha Translation Network, Nitartha International Publications, Nitartha Tibetan-English Dictionary Tools, the Nitartha Digital Library, and the development of Tibetan language fonts and software.

=== Nitartha Institute ===
The Nitartha Institute for Higher Buddhist Studies was founded by Dzogchen Ponlop Rinpoche in 1996 under the guidance of Khenchen Thrangu Rinpoche and Khenpo Tsultrim Gyamtso Rinpoche. Taught by Tibetan and Western teachers, Nitartha courses are modeled on the Tibetan monastic college system (shedra). Nitartha courses are held online and at various locations around the world. In addition, an intensive annual Summer Institute is held in the US Pacific Northwest that also provides deeper training in meditation, and classes in traditional Buddhist arts and healing.

=== Bodhi Seeds ===
Bodhi Seeds is a humanitarian organization founded by Dzogchen Ponlop Rinpoche to help with the many needs of monastic and lay communities in the Himalayan regions of India, Nepal, Bhutan, and Tibet. Bodhi Seeds is currently supporting medical clinics in Rumtek, India, and Legon, Tibet.

== Dzogchen Ponlop lineage ==
1. Namkha Ösal ནམ་མཁའ་འོད་གསལ། (?–1726)
2. Pema Sangngak Tenzin པདྨ་གསང་སྔགས་བསྟན་འཛིན། (1731–1805)
3. Namkha Chökyi Gyatso ནམ་མཁའ་ཆོས་ཀྱི་རྒྱ་མཚོ། (1806–1821?)
4. Jigme Chöying Ösel འཇིགས་མེད་ཆོས་དབྱིངས་འོད་གསལ། (?)
5. Kunchok Tenpe Nyima དཀོན་མཆོག་བསྟན་པའི་ཉི་མ། (?)
6. Jigtral Tsewang Dorje འཇིགས་བྲལ་ཚེ་དབང་རྡོ་རྗེ། (1925–62)
7. Karma Sungrap Ngedön Tenpa Gyaltsen ཀརྨ་གསུང་རབ་ངེས་དོན་བསྟན་པའི་རྒྱལ་མཚན། (1965–present)

== See also ==
- Rangjung Rigpe Dorje,16th Karmapa
- Khenpo Tsultrim Gyamtso Rinpoche
- Dilgo Khyentse Rinpoche
