= Peter A. Jackson =

Australian academic (born 1956)

- Born: Peter Anthony Jackson; 14 February 1956 (age 70)

Academic background
- Education: Australian National University (Ph.D.)
- Thesis: Buddhadasa and Doctrinal Modernisation in Contemporary Thai Buddhism: A Social and Philosophical Analysis (1986)

Peter Anthony Jackson (born 14 February 1956) is an Australian writer and scholar of Buddhism and gender and sexual identities in Thailand. He completed his PhD in Philosophy and Asian Studies at the Australian National University, Canberra in 1986. His PhD dissertation, which is published under the title Buddhadasa: A Buddhist Thinker for the Modern World (1988) reflects his interests in the Thai language, the role of Buddhist thought, and the institution of the sangha in modern Thailand.

Jackson was a Senior Project Officer for the Thai National Curriculum and Materials with the Australian Capital Territory Schools Authority. He is currently a professor of Thai history in the School of Culture, History and Language, at the Australian National University.

== Bibliography ==
- A Topic Index of the Sutta Pitaka (Thai: Datchanii Sap Thamma Nai Phra Suttantapidok), Chulalongkorn University Press, Bangkok, 1986. (189 pages) ISBN 974-566-422-7
- Buddhadasa: A Buddhist Thinker for the Modern World, The Siam Society, Bangkok, 1988. (354 pages, publication of revised version of doctoral dissertation)
- Male Homosexuality in Thailand: An Interpretation of Contemporary Thai Sources, Global Academic Publishers, New York, 1989 (285 pages) ISBN 1-55741-007-0
- Buddhism, Legitimation and Conflict: The Political Functions of Urban Thai Buddhism, Institute of Southeast Asian Studies, Singapore, 1989. (245 pages) ISBN 981-3035-20-X
- Dear Uncle Go: Male Homosexuality in Thailand, Bua Luang Books, Bangkok, 1995. (310 pages) ISBN 0-942777-11-5.
- Buddhadasa: Theravada Buddhism and Modernist Reform in Thailand, Silkworm Books, Chiang Mai, 2003. ISBN 974-7551-91-8 (A fully revised version of the 1988 monograph listed above, including a new epilogue).
