= Kitamura Kigin =

Japanese haiku poet

- 北村季吟
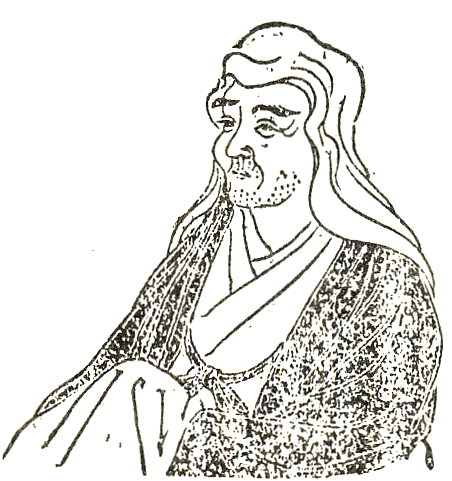
- Born: 19 January 1624; Kitamura, Yasu-gun, Ōmi Province
- Died: 4 August 1705 (aged 81)

Kitamura Kigin (北村季吟; born January 19, 1624 in Kitamura, Yasu-gun, Ōmi Province (now Yasu, Shiga Prefecture); died August 4, 1705) was a Japanese haiku poet and scholar.

== Biography ==
Kitamura, who came from a family of doctors, was a student of Yasuhara Teishitsu (1610–1673) and his teacher Matsunaga Teitoku.

At the age of 23, he published a collection of haiku entitled Yama no i, which made him known as a member of the Teitoku school. In addition to his own haiku, he wrote commentaries on classic works of Japanese literature such as The Tales of Ise, The Pillow Book, The Tale of Genji and Tsurezuregusa. He wrote his first commentary on the Yamato Monogatari at the age of 29. His most famous student was the haiku poet Matsuo Bashō.

== Selected works ==
- Yama no i (山之井)
- Yamato monogatari-shō
- Ise monogatari shūsuishō (伊勢物語拾穂抄)
- Genji monogatari kogetsushō (源氏物語湖月抄)
- Inagoshū
- Hakai umoregi
- Iwa tsutsuji
