= Janet Gyatso =

- Born: Janet Frank; Philadelphia, Pennsylvania
- Education: University of California, Berkeley (BA, MA, PhD)
- Occupations: Professor of Buddhist Studies, Associate Dean for Faculty and Academic Affairs
- Years active: 1981–present
- Employer: Harvard Divinity School
- Known for: Study of Buddhism and Tibetan and South Asian culture
- Notable work: Being Human in a Buddhist World; Women in Tibet; Apparitions of the Self; In the Mirror of Memory; (See § Works.)

Janet Gyatso is a Religious Studies scholar currently employed as the Hershey Professor of Buddhist Studies and the Associate Dean for Faculty and Academic Affairs at Harvard Divinity School. She is a member of the American Academy of Arts and Sciences. Gyatso's research interests are in Buddhism and its relationship to Tibetan and South Asian civilizations.

== Education ==
Gyatso attended the University of California at Berkeley for her BA, MA and PhD. She received her PhD in 1981 in the department of South and Southeast Asian Languages and Literatures [at Berkeley,] with a dissertation on Thangtong Gyalpo and the visionary tradition of Tibetan Buddhism Prior to her PhD, she completed her Master of Arts in 1974 in Sanskrit, and her Bachelor of Arts in 1972 in Religious studies at Berkeley.

== Career ==
Gyatso currently teaches at Harvard Divinity School and has taught with Harvard since 2001. She is the first Hershey Professor of Buddhist Studies at Harvard's Divinity School and is the Associate Dean of Faculty and Academic Affairs. Prior to teaching at Harvard, Gyatso taught at Amherst College (between 1987 and 2001), the University of Michigan (Spring 1999) and Wesleyan University (1986–87; Spring 1988).

From 2000 to 2006, Gyatso held the position of president of the International Association of Tibetan Studies. From 2004 to 2010, she was co-chair of the Buddhism Section of the American Academy of Religion. She has also served as a Humanities jury member for the Infosys Prize from 2020.

== Research ==
Gyatso is known for her work on Tibet, primarily through text analysis and has focused on the twelfth to eighteenth centuries, examining the introduction of Buddhism to Tibet and its eventual status as mainstream in Tibet. Her first monograph explored the writing of autobiography in Tibet, and translated and analysed one of its most beautiful examples, the visionary journals of 'Jigs med gling pa (Apparitions of the Self, Princeton, 1998). Her more recent book, Being Human in a Buddhist World, studied the relationship between Buddhism and medicine in early modern Tibet. Her work has been credited by Barbara Gerke as helping to develop our understanding of the relationship between science and religion in early modern Tibetan culture.

Gyatso has also edited a book entitled Women in Tibet, a compilation of essays on the topic. Gyatso and her fellow editor Hannah Havnevik put this book together to draw attention to the lack of research in the area of women in Tibet. A previous edited collection by Gyatso was "In the Mirror of Memory" (State University of New York Press, 1992), a study of the types of memory theorized and used in Buddhist practice. Other topics of interest have been the reception of Indian poetic theory in Tibetan literature, the nature of experience in Buddhist thought and practice, Buddhist monasticism, and Buddhist conceptions of sex and gender, including the "third sex". She is currently working on animal ethics.

== Works ==
=== Books ===
- Being Human in a Buddhist World: An Intellectual History of Medicine in Early Modern Tibet (2016)
- Women of Tibet. Co-edited with Hanna Havnevik. (2005)
- Apparitions of the Self: The Secret Autobiographies of a Tibetan Visionary (1998)
- In the Mirror of Memory: Reflections on Mindfulness and Remembrance in Indian and Tibetan Buddhism. Edited volume of essays.(1992)

=== Articles ===
- Turning Personal: Recent Work on Autobiography in Tibetan Studies Journal of Asian Studies (2016) 229-235
- One Picture. In Tibetan and Himalayan Healing - An Anthology for Anthony Aris, edited by Charles Ramble and Ulrike Roesler (2014) 273–278.
- Buddhist Practices and Ideals in Desi Sangye Gyatso's Medical Paintings in Bodies in Balance: The Art of Tibetan Medicine, edited by Theresia Hofer (2013) 198–220.
- Looking for Gender in the Medical Paintings of Desi Sangye Gyatso, Regent of the Tibetan Buddhist State in Asian Medicine: Tradition and Modernity in the med issue on Gender, Health and Medicine in Tibet edited by Theresia Hofer and Heidi Fjeld (2010–11) 217–292.
- Discerning Tibetan Modernities: Moments, Methods, Assumptions in Mapping the Modern in Tibet edited by Gray Tuttle (2011) 1–37.
- Experience, Empiricism, and the Fortunes of Authority: Tibetan Medicine and Buddhism on the Eve of Modernity pp. 311–335 in Forms of Knowledge in Early Modern Asia: Explorations in the Intellectual History of India and Tibet edited by Sheldon Pollock (2011)
- Female Ordination in Buddhism: Looking into a Crystal Ball, Making a Future in Dignity and Discipline edited by Thea Mohr and Jampa Choedron (2010) pp. 1–21.
- Spelling Mistakes, Philology, and Feminist Criticism: Women and Boys in Tibetan Medicine in Tibetan Studies in Honor of Samten Karmay Dharamsala: Amnye Machen InstituteFrançoise Pommaret edited by Jena-Luc Achard (2009) 81–98.
- Introduction in Body & Spirit: Tibetan Medical Paintings edited by Laila Williams (2009) 3–13
- Culture and Education in Authenticating Tibet: Answers to China's 100 Questions edited by Anne-Marie Blondeau and Katia Buffetrille (2008)
- A Partial Genealogy of the Lifestory of Yeshe Tsogyal In Journal of the International Association of Tibetan Studies Seminar (2006) 1–27
- Sex in Critical Terms for the Study of Buddhism edited by Donald S. Lopez (2005) 271–290.
- The Ultimate Couple in Buddhist Scriptures edited by Donald S. Lopez (2004) 488–494.
- Compassion at the Millenium: A Buddhist Salvo for the Ethics of the Apocalypse In Thinking Through the Death of God: Essays on the Thought of Thomas J. J. Altizer edited by Brian Schroeder and Lissa McCullough (2004)
- One Plus One Makes Three: Buddhist Gender Conception and the Law of the Non-Excluded Middle in History of Religions (2003): 89–115.
- The Ins and Outs of Self-Transformation: Personal and Social Sides of Visionary Practice in Tibetan Buddhism in Self and Self-Transformation in the History of Religions edited by David Shulman 2002.
- Longchenpa and the Possession of the Dakinis in Tantra in Practice edited by David White (2000) 239–265
- Healing Burns with Fire: The Facilitations of Experience in Tibetan Buddhism in Journal of the American Academy of Religion (1999) 113–147.
- Introduction to Lama Chonam and Sangye Khandro in The Lives and Liberation of Princess Mandarava (1998) 1–14
- Counting Crows' Teeth: Tibetans and Their Diaries in Les habitants du Toit du monde edited by Samten Karmay and Phillip Sagant (1997) 159–178
- The Relic Text as Prophecy: The Semantic Drift of Byang-bu and its Appropriation in the Treasure Tradition in Commemorative Volume for Rai Bahadur T.D edited by Densapa Tashi Tsering, a special issue of Tibet Journal. Still forthcoming.
- Drawn from the Tibetan Treasury: The Gter-ma Literature in Tibetan Literature: Studies in Genre edited by José Ignacio Cabezón and Roger Jackson (1996) 147–169
- An Avalokitesvara Sadhana in Religions of Tibet in Practice edited by Donald S. Lopez (1997) 266–270
- From the Autobiography of a Visionary in Religions of Tibet in Practice edited by Donald S. Lopez (1997) 369–375.
- Guru Chos-dbang's gTer 'byung chen mo: An Early Survey of the Treasure Tradition and its Strategies in Discussing Bon Treasure in Tibetan Studies: Proceedings of the Sixth International Association of Tibetan Studies Seminar edited by Per Kvaerne (1994) 275–287.
- The Logic of Legitimation in the Tibetan Treasure Tradition in History of Religions (1993) 97–134.
- Autobiography in Tibetan Religious Literature: Reflections on Its Modes of Self-Presentation in Tibetan Studies:Proceedings of the 5th International Association of Tibetan Studies Seminar. Narita: Naritasan Institute for Buddhist Studies edited by Shoren Ihara and Zuiho Yamaguchi (1992) 465–478
- Genre, Authorship and Transmission in Visionary Buddhism: The Literary Traditions of Thang-stong Rgyal-po in Tibetan Buddhism: Reason and Revelation edited by Ronald Davidson and Steven Goodman (1992) 95–106.
- Down with the Demoness: Reflections on a Feminine Ground in Tibet in Tibet Journal XII.4 (1987) 34–46
- Signs, Memory and History: A Tantric Buddhist Theory of Scriptural Transmission in Journal of the International Association of Buddhist Studies (1986) 7–35.
- Thang-stong rGyal-po, Father of the Tibetan Drama: The Bodhisattva as Artist in Zlos-gar, The Tibetan Performing Arts: Commemorative Issue on the Occasion of the 25th Anniversary of the Founding of the Tibetan Institute of Performing Arts edited by Jamyang Norbu (1986) 91–104.
- The Development of the gCod Tradition in Soundings in Tibetan Civilization edited by Barbara Aziz and Matthew Kapstein (1985) 74–98.
- The Teachings of Thang-stong rGyal-po in Tibetan Studies in Honour of Hugh Richardson edited by Michael Aris and Aung San Suu Kyi (1980) 111–119

== Awards and accolades ==
- 2017 – Elected to American Academy of Arts and Sciences
- 2017 E. Gene Smith Award for Best Book in Inner Asia; Association of Asian Studies, for her book Being Human in a Buddhist World
- 2016 – Toshihide Numata Book Award for her book Being Human in a Buddhist World
