= Khenpo Tsultrim Gyamtso Rinpoche =

Tibetan yogi (1934–2024)

Khenpo Tsültrim Gyamtso
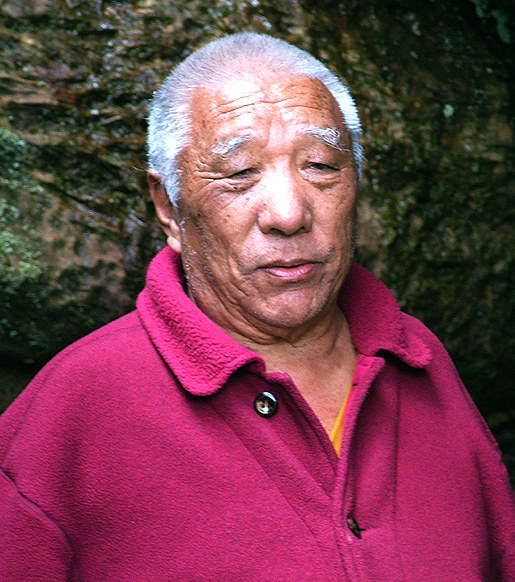
- Khenpo Tsültrim Gyamtso Rinpoche, Tibetan Buddhist teacher.
- Title: Rinpoche

Personal life
- Born: Sherab Lodro; 1 March 1934 Nangchen, Kham, Tibet
- Died: 22 June 2024 (aged 90) Boudhanath, Kathmandu, Nepal
- Education: Khenpo, doctorate of Buddhist studies
- Website: www.ktgrinpoche.org

Religious life
- Religion: Tibetan Buddhism
- Lineage: Karma Kagyu
- Dharma name: Khenpo Tsültrim Gyamtso Rinpoche

Senior posting
- Teacher: Lama Zopa Tarchin
- Based in: Nepal
- Students: Dzogchen Ponlop Rinpoche

Khenpo Tsültrim Gyamtso Rinpoche (Tibetan: མཁན་པོ་ཚུལ་ཁྲིམ་རྒྱ་མཚོ་རིན་པོ་ཆེ་, Wylie: mkhan po tshul khrims rgya mtsho rin po che; 1 March 1934 – 22 June 2024) was a Tibetan scholar yogi in the Kagyu tradition of Tibetan Buddhism. He taught widely in the West, often through songs of realization, his own as well as those composed by Milarepa and other masters of the past. "Tsültrim Gyamtso" translates to English as "Ocean of Ethical Conduct". He died on 22 June 2024, at the age of 90.

== Early life ==
Rinpoche was born in 1934 to a nomad family from Nangchen, Kham (eastern Tibet). He left home at an early age to train with Lama Zopa Tarchin, who was to become his root guru. After completing this early training, he lived the ascetic life of a yogi, wandering throughout Tibet and undertaking intensive, solitary retreats in caves and living in charnel grounds practicing Chöd. At Tsurphu Monastery, the historic seat of the Karma Kagyu lineage, Rinpoche continued his training with the lineage head, the 16th Gyalwa Karmapa, and other masters.

== Exile in India ==
During the 1959 Tibetan uprising Rinpoche fled Tibet, leading a group of Buddhist nuns over the Himalayas to safety in Bhutan. He subsequently went to northern India, where he spent the next nine years at the Buxa Duar Tibetan Refugee Camp. Here he studied and mastered Buddhist scholarship and was awarded a Khenpo degree by the 16th Karmapa and the equivalent Geshe Lharampa degree by the 14th Dalai Lama. At the direction of the Karmapa, he subsequently settled in Bhutan, where he built a nunnery, retreat center, and school.

== Teaching activities ==
Along with Khenchen Thrangu Rinpoche, Khenpo Rinpoche served as the principal teacher at the shedra (monastic college) at Rumtek Monastery, the seat of the Karmapa in exile. As such, he trained all of the major lineage holders of the Karma Kagyu lineage. He also taught extensively around the world.

Rinpoche was also the principal teacher of the Dzogchen Ponlop Rinpoche, and was very close to his Nalandabodhi organization. He also taught extensively in the Shambhala Buddhist community. Rinpoche was also a primary teacher of Lama Shenpen Hookham, Rigdzin Shikpo Rinpoche and Lama Tashi Lhamo.

=== Shentong ===
Shentong views the two truths doctrine as distinguishing between relative and absolute reality, agreeing that relative reality is empty of self-nature, but stating that absolute reality is "empty" (Wylie: stong) only of "other" (Wylie: gzhan) relative phenomena, but is itself not empty. This absolute reality is the "ground or substratum" which is "uncreated and indestructible, noncomposite and beyond the chain of dependent origination." Dolpopa identified this absolute reality with the Buddha-nature.

The shentong-view is related to the Ratnagotravibhāga sutra and the Yogacara-Madhyamaka synthesis of Śāntarakṣita. The truth of sunyata is acknowledged, but not considered to be the highest truth, which is the empty nature of mind. Insight into sunyata is preparatory for the recognition of the nature of mind.

Hookham explains the Shentong position, referring to Khenpo Tsultrim's Progressive Stages of Meditation on Emptiness. Khenpo Tsultrim presented five stages of meditation, which he related to five different schools or approaches:

- "Sravaka meditation on non-self" – meditation on the emptiness of the skandhas and the non-existence of a personal self;
- "Cittamatra-approach" – meditation on the mind-stream, the ever-continuing process of perception, and the non-duality of perceived and perceiver;
- "Svatantrika-Madhyamaka approach" – meditation on all dhammas, which are empty of self-nature, and the negation of any "substance";
- "Prasangika-Madhyamaka approach" – meditation on "the non-conceptual (nisprapanca) nature of both the appearance of phenomena and their self-emptiness." In this approach, all concepts are to be abandoned;
- Shentong (Yogacara Madhyamaka) – meditation on Paramarthasatya ("Absolute Reality"), (Note: According to Hookham, non-dual experience is Ultimate Reality.) Buddhajnana, (Note: According to Hookham, "The Chinese Tathagarba schools describe Buddhajnana as the totality of all that is, which pervades every part of all that is in its totality." According to Hookham, for Shentong Buddhajnana is "the non-dual nature of Mind completely unobscured and endowed with its countless Buddha Qualities (Buddhagunas).) which is beyond concepts, and described by terms as "truly existing." This approach helps "to overcome certain residual subtle concepts," and "the habit - fostered on the earlier stages of the path - of negating whatever experience arises in his/her mind." It destroys false concepts, as does prasangika, but it also alerts the practitioner "to the presence of a dynamic, positive Reality that is to be experienced once the conceptual mind is defeated."

== Writings ==
- Buddha Nature:The Mahayana Uttaratantra Shastra with Commentary by Jamgon Kongtrul and Khenpo Tsultrim Gyamtso Rinpoche, Snow Lion Publications (2000), ISBN 1-55939-128-6
- Maitreya's Distinguishing Phenomena and Pure Being, Commentary by Mipham and Khenpo Tsultrim Gyamtso Rinpoche, translated by Jim Scott, Snow Lion Publications (2004) ISBN 1-55939-215-0
- Progressive Stages of Meditation on Emptiness, by Khenpo Tsültrim Gyamtso Rinpoche, translated and arranged by Shenpen Hookham, Zhyisil Chokyi Ghatsal Publications (2001) ISBN 1-877294-01-2
- Stars of Wisdom: Analytical Meditation, Songs of Yogic Joy, and Prayers of Aspiration by Khenpo Tsültrim Gyamtso, translated by Ari Goldfield and Rose Taylor, Forewords by the Seventeenth Karmapa and the Dalai Lama, Shambhala Publications (2010), ISBN 1-59030-775-5
- The Sun of Wisdom: Teachings on the Noble Nagarjuna's Fundamental Wisdom of the Middle Way by Khenpo Tsültrim Gyamtso Rinpoche, Shambhala Publications (2003), ISBN 1-57062-999-4
- The Moon of Wisdom: Chapter Six of Chandrakirti's Entering the Middle Way with commentary from the Eighth Karmapa Mikyo Dorje's Chariot of the Dagpo Kagyu Siddhas translated under the guidance of Khenpo Tsültrim Gyamtso Rinpoche by Ari Goldfield, Jules Levinson, Jim Scott & Birgit Scott, Snow Lion Publications (2005), ISBN 978-1-55939-231-0

== Sources ==
- Hookham, S.K. (1991), The Buddha within : Tathagatagarbha doctrine according to the Shentong interpretation of the Ratnagotravibhaga, Albany, NY: State University of New York Press, ISBN 978-0791403587
- Stearns, Cyrus (1999), The Buddha from Dolpo: A Study of the Life and Thought of the Tibetan Master Dolpopa Sherab Gyaltsen, State University of New York Press, ISBN 0-7914-4191-1
- Stearns, Cyrus (2003), The Buddha from Dolpo: A Study of the Life and Thought of the Tibetan Master Dolpopa Sherab Gyaltsen, Motilal Banarsidass Publ., ISBN 81-208-1833-4
