= Tenzin Mariko =

Tibetan transgender person and a queer icon

- Born: Tenzin Ugen; Bir, Himachal Pradesh
- Years active: 2015–present

Tenzin Mariko (born 1997) is a Tibetan model and LGBTQ icon. She is the first openly transgender Tibetan in the public eye.

== Early life ==
Born as Tenzin Ugen to Tsering Gonpo and Chime Yangzom in Bir, Himachal Pradesh, she was sent to the Samdrup Darjay Choling Monastery in Darjeeling to become a Buddhist monk. At the age of 13, Mariko was sent to Tergar Institute in Kathmandu to further her monastic studies. She left the institute and returned to Dharamshala at the age of 16. Tenzin also went to school in Delhi to become a professional makeup artist. When she came out, people encouraged Tenzin to become a dancer or entertainer. She currently lives in the suburb of McLeod Ganj in Dharamshala.

== Family ==
In the early 1950s, Mariko's parents fled Tibet during the annexation of Tibet by the People's Republic of China and moved to Dharamsala. Her parents had five children; they were all boys and were expected to be monks.

== Career ==
Mariko's first appearance as a transgender model was at the 2015 Miss Tibet pageant held in Dharamshala. In 2018, she participated in MTV India's Ace of Space 1. Tenzin Mariko gave a TedTalk on TEDxDharmshala on August 29, 2019. Titled “The Monk Who Traded His Robes for Skirts”, Mariko narrates her story of accepting her sexuality and coming out as the first Tibetan transgender woman.
