= Nalandabodhi =

Buddhist organization

Nalandabodhi is an international Buddhist organization founded in the United States by Dzogchen Ponlop Rinpoche in 1997 and is named after the historic Nalanda university of India. "Nalanda" translates literally as "the place that confers the lotus (of spiritual knowledge)," and Bodhi translates as "enlightenment." Their international headquarters is Nalanda West in Seattle, with centers and study groups in the United States, Brazil, Canada, Mexico, and throughout Europe and Asia.

Dzogchen Ponlop Rinpoche worked closely with his teacher, Khenpo Tsultrim Gyamtso Rinpoche, in creating Nalandabodhi's paths of Study, Meditation, and Mindful Activity. Nalandabodhi’s path is rooted in the Vajrayana traditions of Tibet and India. Dzogchen Ponlop Rinpoche, a lineage holder of the Kagyu and Nyingma Buddhist lineages, currently serves as the Spiritual Director of Nalandabodhi.

== Organization ==
Nalandabodhi has an international senior administrative team, board of directors, and council of senior teachers (Acharyas, Lamas, and Mitras) who work together to run Nalandabodhi under the direction of Dzogchen Ponlop Rinpoche.

The Nalandabodhi International senior administrative team is responsible for the strategic and day-to-day operations of Nalandabodhi International.

Karma Sangha is the Nalandabodhi Board of Directors. This group is responsible for safeguarding the financial and legal health of Nalandabodhi, as well as establishing policies and procedures that support the implementation of Ponlop Rinpoche’s vision. The Nalandabodhi Canada Executive Board (NCEB) is the corresponding administrative body for Canada.

The Nalandabodhi Mitras, lamas, and acharyas supervise the paths of study, meditation, and mindful activity. In addition, these senior Buddhist teachers guide the organization in accord with the principles of dharma, teach programs, conduct personal practice interviews with students, answer study questions, give refuge vows, bodhisattva vows, and reading transmissions (such as for the Vajrayana preliminary practices ("ngöndro")). They may also perform wedding, funeral, and other ceremonial services. The Mitra Council consists of senior Nalandabodhi teachers appointed by Dzogchen Ponlop Rinpoche. "Mitra" is a Sanskrit word derived from kalayanamitra or "spiritual friend."

Acharyas	Lamas	Mitras
Tenpa Gyaltsen	Rabten Tshering	Karl Brunnhölzl
Tashi Wangchuk	Tenam	Lee Worley
Lhakpa Tshering		Mark Power
		Tyler Dewar

== Headquarters, Centers, and Retreat Sites ==
Nalanda West, located in Seattle, Washington and inaugurated in 2005, is the primary seat for Dzogchen Ponlop Rinpoche and Nalandabodhi. Nalanda West operates as an event and contemplative resource center, hosting programs related to the traditional Five Fields of Knowledge: creativity and the arts, health and well-being, communication, knowing and reasoning, and the inner science of the mind.

There are Nalandabodhi centers in major cities throughout the United States and Canada including New York, New York; the Maitrivana center in Vancouver, British Columbia; Boulder, Colorado; and West Hartford, Connecticut. Internationally, there are Nalandabodhi centers in Hong Kong, Taipei, Mexico, Brazil, Germany, Austria, Poland, and The Netherlands. Nalandabodhi Akasha is an online center offering classes and weekly group meditation for those who do not live near a physical Nalandabodhi center. A full list of Nalandabodhi centers is available on their website.

In 2018 Nalandabodhi Canada purchased Mahasiddha Retreat Center near BANFF in British Columbia. This retreat center is available for private and group retreats.

== Nalandabodhi Path of Meditation ==
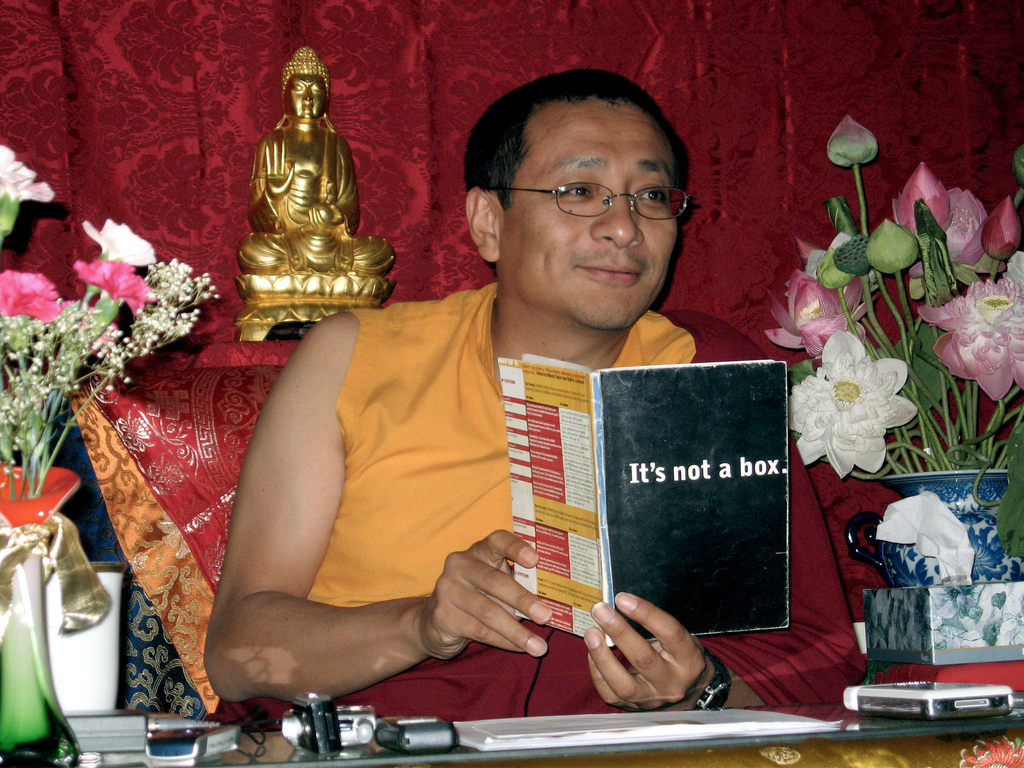
Dzogchen Ponlop Rinpoche uses his specially altered edition of the text, The Progressive Stages of Meditation on Emptiness, to suggest what's meant by, for example, emptiness of self.

The Nalandabodhi Path of Meditation offers comprehensive training in Buddhist meditation in the traditional Indian and Tibetan lamrim, or gradual, style of instruction. Nalandabodhi members following the Path of Meditation work with trained Practice Instructors who encourage, guide, and support them in their practice by meeting with them individually or in small groups. General meditation instruction is also available to the public at all Nalandabodhi centers.

The Path of Meditation begins with instruction in shamatha, or "calm-abiding" meditation. After gaining familiarity with shamatha, students continue to vipashyana or analytical meditations on both ultimate and relative bodhicitta. First, students gain familiarity with ultimate bodhicitta through meditations on selflessness and emptiness or shunyata, in the context of the Four Foundations of Mindfulness and the Progressive Stages of Meditation on Emptiness. Next, relative bodhicitta practices such as lojong (mind training), tonglen, and the Four Immeasurables are taught. Through shamatha practice students cultivate a relaxed and attentive mind. On the basis of that calmness students investigate the nature of themselves and appearances by means of ultimate bodhicitta meditations. Finally, having gained some familiarity with relaxing self-fixation and clinging, students engage in relative bodhicitta meditations to further develop their compassion, kindness, and ability to benefit others. After completing these foundational practices, students who are drawn towards the Vajrayana may choose to begin the ngondro or preliminary practices for Vajrayana, Mahamudra, and Dzogchen under the guidance of Dzogchen Ponlop Rinpoche or another Nalandabodhi senior teacher.

== Nalandabodhi Path of Study ==
The Nalandabodhi Path of Study is an overview of the traditional courses of study in Tibetan Buddhist shedras (monastic colleges), and is rooted in the philosophical and scholarly tradition of Nalanda University in India. It is one of the first compilations of such material ever assembled in English and is available at Nalandabodhi Centers and study groups, online, or by individual home study. Nalandabodhi's Path of Study is a progressive set of four courses (Introduction to Buddhism, Hinayana, Mahayana, and Vajrayana) each covering a variety of topics such as The Four Noble Truths, Interdependent Origination, Selflessness, Emptiness, Buddha Nature, and bodhicitta. All study courses are available to the general public (with the exception of the Vajrayana study course). They are designed to be taken in a sequential manner, since the concepts tend to build one on the other, but may be taken out of order with the understanding that extra study may be required. The material is intended to complement, support, and inform one's practices within the Nalandabodhi Path of Meditation. For example, before engaging in meditations on emptiness, it is recommended students attend the relevant study courses on this topic. The Nalandabodhi bookstore sells the course materials and readings for each course. These materials are primarily drawn from teachings by Dzogchen Ponlop Rinpoche and Khenpo Tsultrim Gyamtso Rinpoche, and present the topics mainly from a Kagyu and Nyingma lineage perspective.

The topics covered in these courses are taught in further detail at Nītārtha Institute, a school of advanced Buddhist philosophical studies also headed by Dzogchen Ponlop Rinpoche.

== Nalandabodhi Path of Mindful Activity ==
The Nalandabodhi Path of Mindful Activity "bridges study and meditation with every aspect of life in concrete and practical ways." and "provides a variety of exercises and techniques for being present during life’s experiences, whether they are moments of routine activity, difficult situations, or major life transitions."

Similar to the Path of Study and Path of Meditation, Nalandabodhi publishes materials and offers classes on the topics of bringing wisdom and compassion into daily life, especially in the context of volunteering, sangha leadership, and community engagement. These include teachings on mindful listening, compassion, kindness, and mindful service.

Also included within the Path of Mindful Activity are the various service projects conducted or supported by Nalandabodhi such as volunteering at shelters, supporting the environment, serving food to the homeless, providing support to both lay and monastic communities in the Himalayan regions through Bodhi Seeds, and offering dharma to prisoners in the US through Mind Without Borders.
