= Dae Gak =

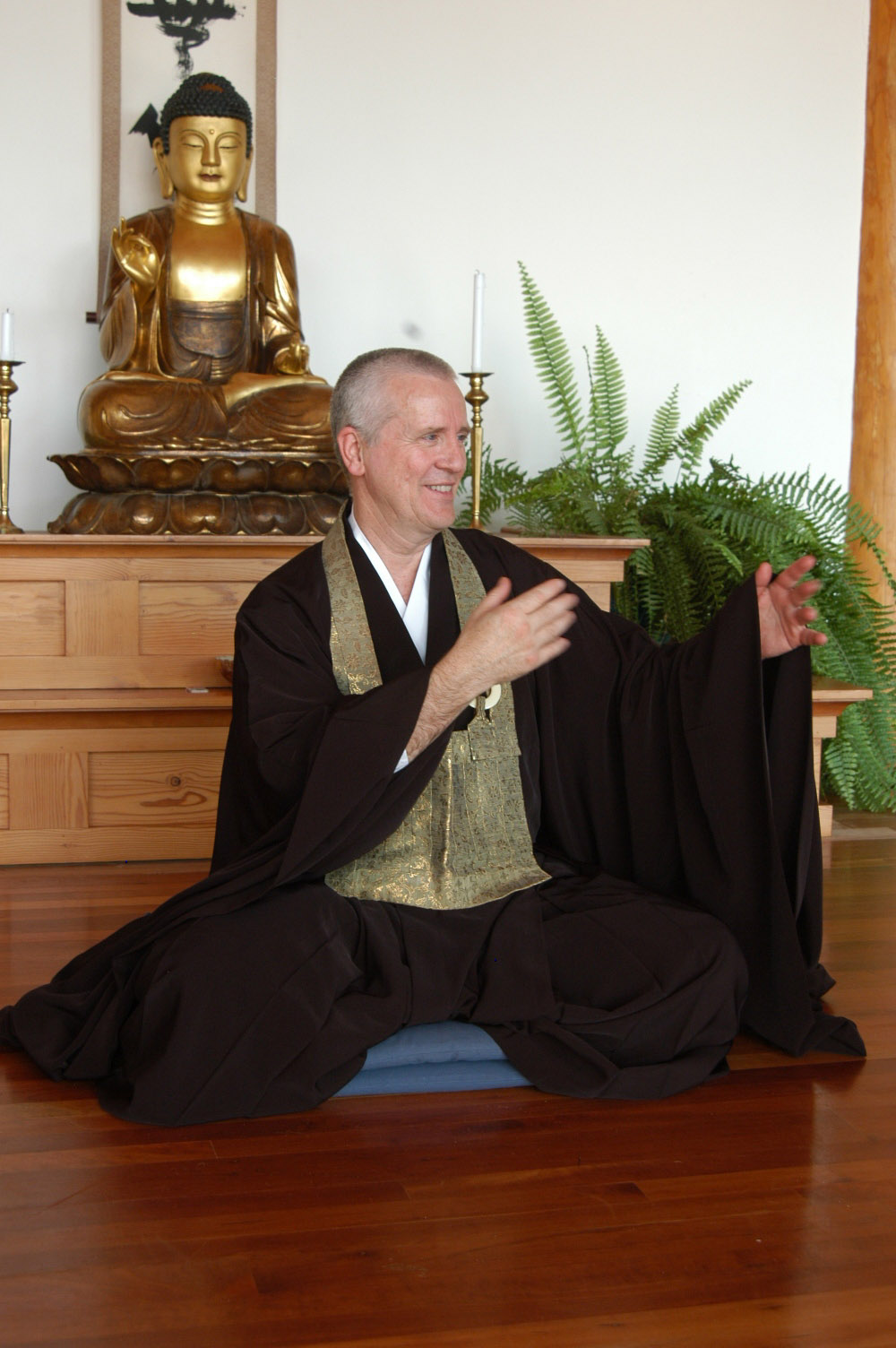
- Title: Zen master

Personal life
- Born: Robert Genthner c. 1947 Springfield, Massachusetts, United States
- Children: Gretchen, Maggie and Sam Genthner
- Education: American International College; Kent State University

Religious life
- Religion: Seon

Senior posting
- Based in: Furnace Mountain
- Predecessor: Seung Sahn
- Students: Sen Shin
- Website: www.furnacemountainzen.org

Dae Gak (born 1947), born Robert Genthner, is a Zen master and the guiding teacher of Furnace Mountain in Clay City, Kentucky, a Korean Buddhist temple and retreat center co-founded in 1986 with Seung Sahn. He received Dharma transmission from Seung Sahn in 1994, and now teaches independently of Seung Sahn's Kwan Um School of Zen. In addition to Furnace Mountain he serves as guiding teacher for other Zen groups in North America, Germany and England. He also holds a Ph.D. in psychology and is currently a licensed psychologist in the state of Kentucky.

== Biography ==
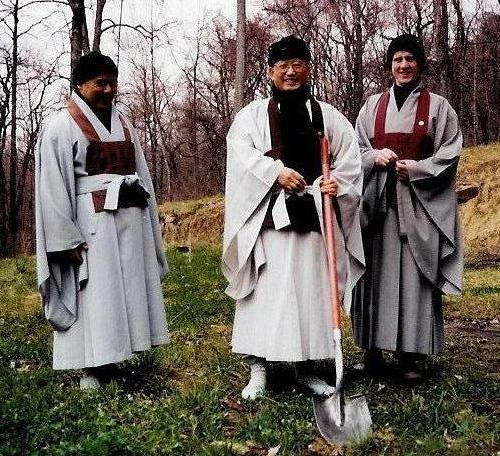
From left to right: Su Bong, Seung Sahn, and Dae Gak

Robert Genthner (Buddhist name Dae Gak, "great enlightenment") was born in Springfield, Massachusetts in 1947. He went to graduate school in Psychology at Kent State University. Genthner graduated from Kent State in 1973 with his Ph.D. in clinical psychology, later that year teaching psychology at Eastern Kentucky University in Richmond, Kentucky. He stopped teaching in 1979, afterward practicing as a licensed psychologist.

In 1979, Genthner met Korean monk and Zen teacher Seung Sahn during a retreat at the Providence Zen Center. In the early 1980s, he and several other individuals founded the Lexington Zen Center in his home, with retreats sometimes taking place at the homes of other practitioners. The group became affiliated with Seung Sahn's Kwan Um School of Zen, founded in July 1983. In 1986, he co-founded a Zen temple at Furnace Mountain with Seung Sahn. The temple, Kwan Se Um San Ji Sah (which means "Perceive World Sound High Ground Temple"), was completed in 1994. Also that year, Genthner/Dae Gak received Dharma transmission from Seung Sahn, and founded the Cincinnati Zen Center.

In 2000, Genthner was subject to disciplinary action following allegations by two patients of sexual misconduct and violations of patient confidentiality; while denying wrongdoing, he agreed to a suspension of one year, a fine, and one year of supervised probation after his license was reinstated. Also in 2000, he left the Kwan Um School of Zen and began his own. He has since established groups in North America, Germany and England. Genther, and the Furnace Mountain Zen Retreat Center was featured in the 2010 documentary film Zen Furnace produced by Kentucky filmmaker Steven Middleton.

== Gallery ==
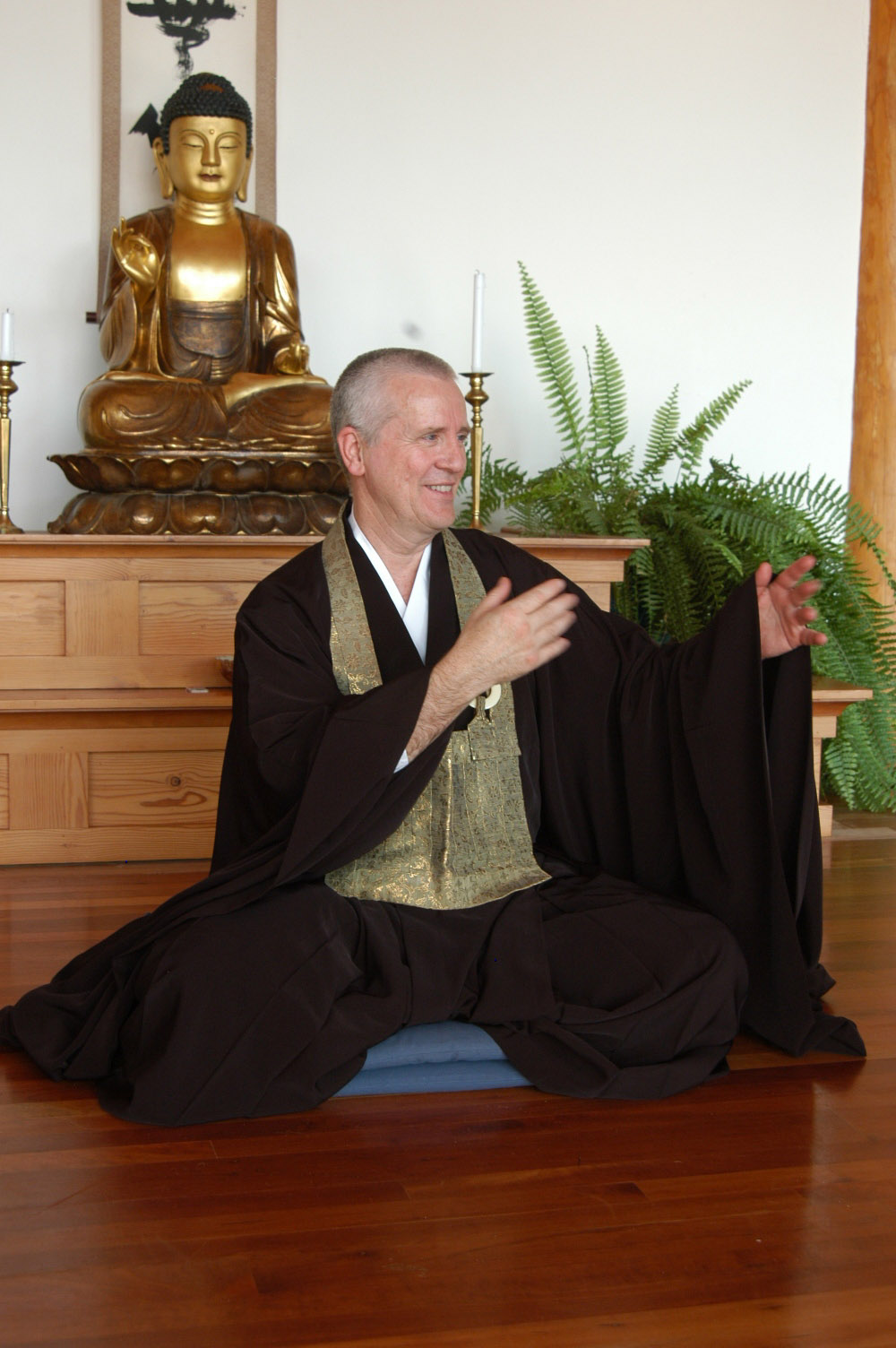
Dae Gak, guiding teacher of Furnace Mountain

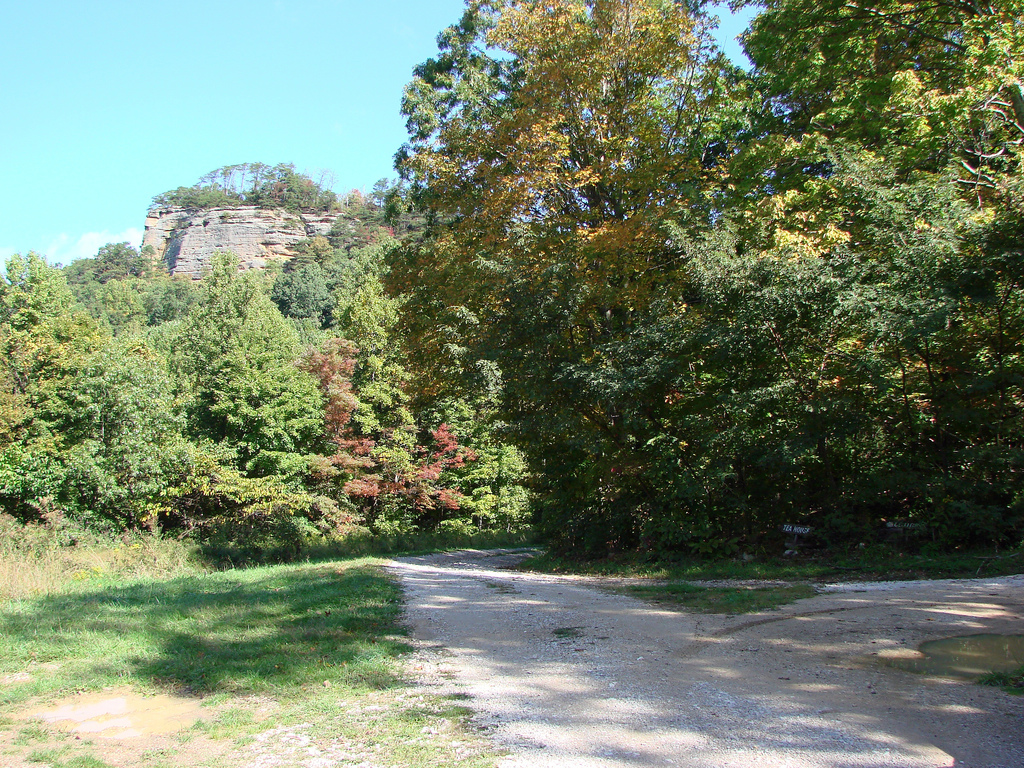
The road leading into Furnace Mountain—you can see the bluff above

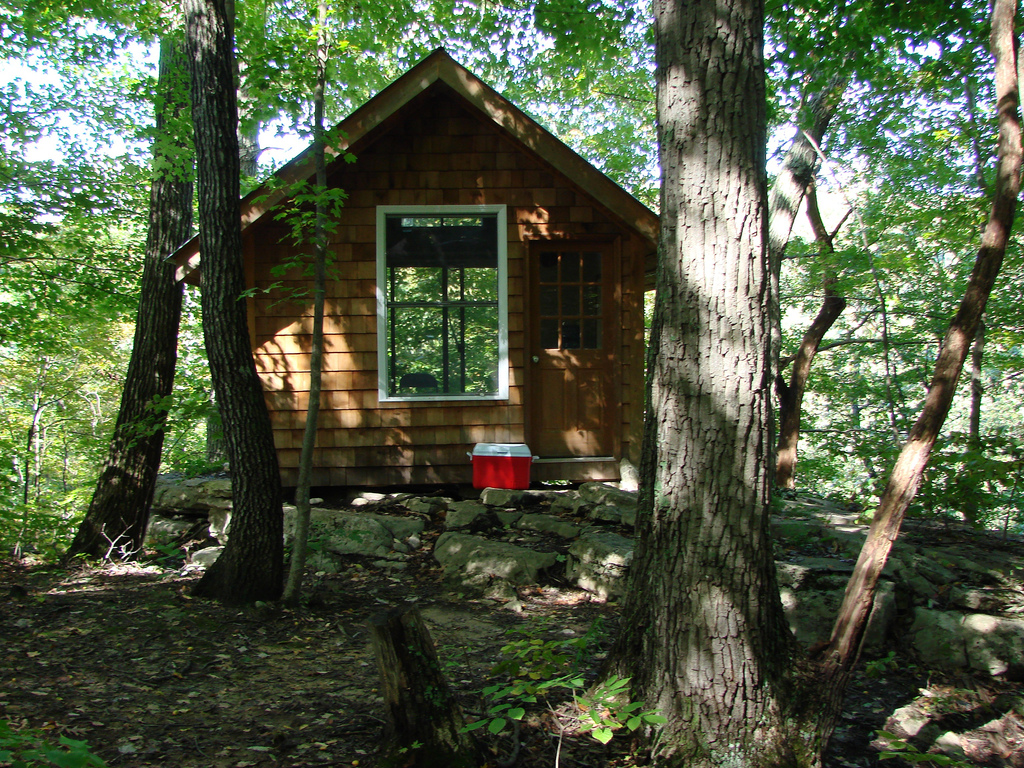
Individual retreat house for guests at Furnace Mountain

== Groups ==
- Lexington Zen Center (Lexington, KY)
- Cincinnati Zen Center (Cincinnati, OH)
- Hamilton Zen Center (Hamilton, OH)
- Dae Do Sah Zen Group (Rockville, MD)
- South West Son Academy (Houston, TX)
- Zen Island Fellowship (Galveston, TX)
- Bristol Zen Centre (Bristol, UK)
- Wilmington Zen (Wilmington, OH)

== Affiliates ==
- Mansfield Zen Center (Mansfield, OH)
- Queensland Zen Centre (Queensland, AU)
- Zen Society of Wooster (Wooster, OH)

== Dharmic Lineage ==
The following list documents Dae Gak's transmission lineage, starting with the Buddha and the First Patriarch.

India

	Sanskrit	Chinese	Vietnamese	Japanese	Korean
1	Mahākāśyapa	摩訶迦葉 / Móhējiāyè	Ma-Ha-Ca-Diếp	Makakashō	마하가섭 / Mahagasŏp
2	Ānanda	阿難陀 (阿難) / Ānántuó (Ānán)	A-Nan-Đà (A-Nan)	Ananda Buddha (Anan)	아난다 (아난) / Ananda Buddha (Anan)
3	Śānavāsa	商那和修 / Shāngnàhéxiū	Thương-Na-Hòa-Tu	Shōnawashu	상나화수 / Sangnahwasu
4	Upagupta	優婆掬多 / Yōupójúduō	Ưu-Ba-Cúc-Đa	Ubakikuta	우바국다 / Upakukta
5	Dhrtaka	提多迦 / Dīduōjiā	Đề-Đa-Ca	Daitaka	제다가 / Chedaga
6	Miccaka	彌遮迦 / Mízhējiā	Di-Dá-Ca	Mishaka	미차가 / Michaga
7	Vasumitra	婆須密 (婆須密多) / Póxūmì (Póxūmìduō)	Bà-Tu-Mật (Bà-Tu-Mật-Đa)	Bashumitsu (Bashumitta)	바수밀다 / Pasumilta
8	Buddhanandi	浮陀難提 / Fútuónándī	Phật-Đà-Nan-Đề	Buddanandai	불타난제 / Pŭltananje
9	Buddhamitra	浮陀密多 / Fútuómìduō	Phục-Đà-Mật-Đa	Buddamitta	복태밀다 / Puktaemilda
10	Pārśva	波栗濕縛 / 婆栗濕婆 (脅尊者) / Bōlìshīfú / Pólìshīpó (Xiézūnzhě)	Ba-Lật-Thấp-Phược / Bà-Lật-Thấp-Bà (Hiếp-Tôn-Giả)	Barishiba (Kyōsonja)	파률습박 (협존자) / P'ayulsŭppak (Hyŏpjonje)
11	Punyayaśas	富那夜奢 / Fùnàyèshē	Phú-Na-Dạ-Xa	Funayasha	부나야사 / Punayasa
12	Ānabodhi / Aśvaghoṣa	阿那菩提 (馬鳴) / Ānàpútí (Mǎmíng)	A-Na-Bồ-Đề (Mã-Minh)	Anabotei (Memyō)	아슈바고샤 (마명) / Asyupakosya (Mamyŏng)
13	Kapimala	迦毘摩羅 / Jiāpímóluó	Ca-Tỳ-Ma-La	Kabimora (Kabimara)	가비마라 / Kabimara
14	Nāgārjuna	那伽閼剌樹那 (龍樹) / Nàqiéèlàshùnà (Lóngshù)	Na-Già-Át-Lạt-Thụ-Na (Long-Thọ)	Nagaarajuna (Ryūju)	나가알랄수나 (용수) / Nakaallalsuna (Yongsu)
15	Āryadeva / Kānadeva	迦那提婆 / Jiānàtípó	Ca-Na-Đề-Bà	Kanadaiba	가나제바 / Kanajeba
16	Rāhulata	羅睺羅多 / Luóhóuluóduō	La-Hầu-La-Đa	Ragorata	라후라다 / Rahurada
17	Sanghānandi	僧伽難提 / Sēngqiénántí	Tăng-Già-Nan-Đề	Sōgyanandai	승가난제 / Sŭngsananje
18	Sanghayaśas	僧伽舍多 / Sēngqiéshèduō	Tăng-Già-Da-Xá	Sōgyayasha	가야사다 / Kayasada
19	Kumārata	鳩摩羅多 / Jiūmóluóduō	Cưu-Ma-La-Đa	Kumorata (Kumarata)	구마라다 / Kumarada
20	Śayata / Jayata	闍夜多 / Shéyèduō	Xà-Dạ-Đa	Shayata	사야다 / Sayada
21	Vasubandhu	婆修盤頭 (世親) / Póxiūpántóu (Shìqīn)	Bà-Tu-Bàn-Đầu (Thế-Thân)	Bashubanzu (Sejin)	바수반두 (세친) / Pasubandu (Sechin)
22	Manorhitajuna	摩拏羅 / Mónáluó	Ma-Noa-La	Manura	마나라 / Manara
23	Haklenayaśas	鶴勒那 (鶴勒那夜奢) / Hèlènà (Hèlènàyèzhě)	Hạc-Lặc-Na	Kakurokuna (Kakurokunayasha)	학륵나 / Haklŭkna
24	Simhabodhi	師子菩提 / Shīzǐpútí	Sư-Tử-Bồ-Đề / Sư-Tử-Trí	Shishibodai	사자 / Saja
25	Vasiasita	婆舍斯多 / Póshèsīduō	Bà-Xá-Tư-Đa	Bashashita	바사사다 / Pasasada
26	Punyamitra	不如密多 / Bùrúmìduō	Bất-Như-Mật-Đa	Funyomitta	불여밀다 / Punyŏmilta
27	Prajñātāra	般若多羅 / Bōrěduōluó	Bát-Nhã-Đa-La	Hannyatara	반야다라 / Panyadara
28	Dharmayana / Bodhidharma	Ta Mo / 菩提達磨	Đạt-Ma / Bồ-Đề-Đạt-Ma	Daruma / Bodaidaruma	Tal Ma /보리달마 / Poridalma]

China

	CHINESE NAME	LIFE DATES	VIỆT NAME	JAPANESE NAME	KOREAN NAME
28 / 1	達磨 / Ta-mo	?	Đạt-Ma	Daruma	달마 / Dal-Ma
29 / 2	慧可 / Hui-k'o	487–593	Huệ-Khả	Eka	혜가 / Hye-Ga
30 / 3	僧璨 / Seng-ts'an	?–606	Tăng-Xán	Sōsan	승찬 / Seung-Chan
31 / 4	道信 / Tao-hsin	580–651	Đạo-Tín	Dōshin	도신 / Do-Shim
32 / 5	弘忍 / Hung-jen	601/2–674/5	Hoằng-Nhẫn	Kōnin	홍인 / Hong-Ihn
33 / 6	慧能 / Hui-neng	638–713	Huệ-Năng	Enō	혜능 / Hye-Neung
34 / 7	南嶽懷讓 / Nan-yüeh Huai-jang	677–744	Nam-Nhạc Hoài-Nhượng	Nangaku Ejō	남악회양 / Nam-Ak Hwe-Yang
35 / 8	馬祖道一 / Ma-tsu Tao-i	709–788	Mã-Tổ Đạo-Nhất	Baso Dōitsu	마조도일 / Ma-Jo To-Il
36 / 9	百丈懷海 / Pai-chang Huai-hai	720?/749?–814	Bách-Trượng Hoài-Hải	Hyakujō Ekai	백장회해 / Paek-Chang Hwe-Hae
37 / 10	黃蘗希運 / Huang-po Hsi-yün	?–850	Hoàng-Bá Hy-Vận	Ōbaku Kiun	황벽희운 / Hwang-Byeok Heu-Iun
38 / 11	臨濟義玄 / Lin-chi I-hsüan	?–866/7	Lâm-Tế Nghĩa-Huyền	Rinzai Gigen	임제의현 / Im-Je Eui-Hyeon
39 / 12	興化存奬 / Hsing-hua Tzun-chiang	830–888	Hưng-Hóa Tồn-Tương	Kōke Sonshō	흥화존장 / Heung-Hwa Chon-Jang
40 / 13	南院道癰 / Nan-yüan Hui-yung	d 930?/952?	Nam-Viện Huệ-Ngung	Nanin Egyō	남원도옹 / Nam-Weon To-Ong
41 / 14	風穴延沼 / Feng-hsüeh Yen-chao	896–973	Phong-Huyệt Diên-Chiểu	Fūketsu Enshō	풍혈연소 / Peung-Hyeol Yeon-So
42 / 15	首山省念 / Shou-shan Shen-nien	925/6–992/3	Thủ-Sơn Tỉnh-Niệm	Shūzan Shōnen	수산성념 / Su-San Seong-Nyeom
43 / 16	汾陽善昭 / Fen-yang Shan-chao	947–1024	Phần-Dương Thiện-Chiêu	Funyō Zenshō	분양선소 / Pun-Yang Seon-Jo
44 / 17	慈明楚圓 / Tz'u-ming Ch'u-yüan	986–1039	Thạch-Sương Sở-Viên	Jimyō Soen	자명초원 / Cham-Yeong Cho-Weon
45 / 18	楊岐方會 / Yang-ch'i Fang-hui	992–1049	Dương-Kỳ Phương-Hội	Yōgi Hōe	양기방회 / Yang-Gi Pang-Hwe
46 / 19	白雲守端 / Pai-yün Shou-tuan	1025–1072	Bạch-Vân Thủ-Đoan	Hakuun Shutan	백운수단 / Pae-Gun Su-Dan
47 / 20	五祖法演 / Wu-tsu Fa-yen	1024–1104	Ngũ-Tổ Pháp-Diễn	Goso Hōen	오조법연 / O-Jo Peob-Yeon
48 / 21	圓悟克勤 / Yuan-wu K'o-ch'in	1063–1135	Viên-Ngộ Khắc-Cần	Engo Kokugon	원오극근 / Hwe-O Keuk-Keun
49 / 22	虎丘紹隆 / Hsü-ch’iu Shao-lung	1077–1136	Hổ-Khâu Thiệu-Long	Kukyū Jōryū	호구소융 / Ho-Gu Sor-Yung
50 / 23	應庵曇華 / Ying-an T'an-hua	1103–1163	Ứng Am Đàm Hoa	Oan Donge	응암담화 / Eung-Am Tam-Hwa
51 / 24	密庵咸傑 / Mi-an Hsi-chieh	1118?/1138?–1186	Mật Am Hàm Kiệt	Mittan Kanketsu	밀암함걸 / Mir-Am Ham-Keol
52 / 25	破庵祖先 / P'o-an Tsu-hsien	1136–1211	Phá Am Tổ Tiên	Hoan Sosen	파암조선 / Pa-Am Cho-Seon
53 / 26	無準圓照 / Wu-chun Yuan-chao (無準師範 / Wu-chun Shih-fan)	1174/8–1249	. (Vô Chuẩn Sư Phạm)	. (Mujun Shiban)	무준원조 / Mujun Wenjo (무준사범 / Mujun Sabeom)
54 / 27	雪巖惠朗 / Hsüeh-yen Hui-lang		Tuyết Nham Tổ Khâm	Setsugan	설암혜랑 / Seon-Am Hye-Rang
55 / 28	及庵宗信 / Chi-an Tsung-hsin		Cật Yêm Tông Hâm		급암종신 / Keu-Bam Chong-Sil
56 / 29	石屋淸珙 / Shih-wu Ch'ing-kung	1272–1352	Thạch Ốc Thanh Củng	Sekioku Seikyō	석옥청공 / Seo-Gok Cheong-Gong

Korea

	CHINESE NAME	KOREAN NAME	LIFE DATES
57 / 30 / 1	太古普愚 (Tàigǔ Pǔyú)	태고보우 / Tae-Go Bo-Wu	1301–1382
58 / 31 / 2	幻庵混修 (Huànān Hùnxiū)	환암혼수 / Hwan-Am Hon-Su	1320–1392
59 / 32 / 3	龜谷覺雲 (Guīgǔ Juéyún)	구곡각운 / Gu-Gok Gak-Un	
60 / 33 / 4	碧溪淨心 (Bìxī Jìngxīn)	벽계정심 / Byeok-Ge Jeong-Shim	
61 / 34 / 5	碧松智嚴 (Bìsōng Zhìyán)	벽송지엄 / Byeok-Song Ji-Eom	1464–1534
62 / 35 / 6	芙蓉靈觀 (Fúróng Língguān)	부용영관 / Bu-Yong Yeong-Gwan	1485–1567/1571
63 / 36 / 7	淸虛休靜 (Qīngxū Xiūjìng)	청허휴정 / Cheong-Heo Hyu-Jeong (서산대사 / Seo-San Dae-Sa)	1520–1604
64 / 37 / 8	鞭羊彦機 (Biānyáng Yànjī)	편양언기 / Pyeon-Yang Eon-Gi	1581–1644
65 / 38 / 9	楓潭義諶 (Fēngtán Yìchén)	풍담의심 / Pung-Dam Eui-Sim	?–1665
66 / 39 / 10	月潭雪霽 (Yuètán Xuějì)	월담설제 / Wol-Dam Seol-Je	?–1704
67 / 40 / 11	喚惺志安 (Huànxīng Zhìān)	환성지안 / Hwan-Seong Ji-An	?–1729
68 / 41 / 12	虎巖體淨 (Hǔyán Tǐjìng)	호암체정 / Ho-Am Che-Jeong	?–1748
69 / 42 / 13	靑峰巨岸 (Qīngfēng Jùàn)	청봉거안 / Cheong-Bong Geo-An	
70 / 43 / 14	栗峰靑古 (Lìfēng Qīnggǔ)	율봉청고 / Yul-Bong Cheong-Kwa	?–1823
71 / 44 / 15	錦虛法沾 (Jǐnxū Fǎzhān)	금허법첨 / Geum-Heo Beop-Cheom	
72 / 45 / 16	龍岩慧彦 (Lóngyán Huìyàn)	용암혜언 / Yong-Am Hye-Eon	
73 / 46 / 17	永月奉律 (Yǒngyuè Fènglù)	영월봉율 / Yeong-Wol Bong-Yul	
74 / 47 / 18	萬化普善 (Wànhuà Pǔshàn)	만화보선 / Man-Hwa Bo-Seon	?–1879
75 / 48 / 19	鏡虛惺牛 (Jìngxū Xīngniú)	경허성우 / Gyeong-Heo Seong-Wu	1849–1912
76 / 49 / 20	滿空月面 (Mǎnkòng Yuèmiàn)	만공월면 / Man-Gong Weol-Myeon	1871–1946
77 / 50 / 21	高峯景昱 (Gāofēng Jǐngyù)	고봉경욱 / Ko-Bong Gyeong-Uk	1890–1961/2
78 / 51 / 22	崇山行願 (Chóngshān Xíngyuàn)	숭산행원 / Seung-Sahn Haeng-Won	1927–2004

America

	KOREAN NAME	ENGLISH NAME	LIFE DATES
79 / 52 / 23/ 1	대각 / Dae Gak	Robert Genthner	1947-

== Bibliography ==
- Gak, Dae (2012). Upright with Poise and Grace. Gnomon Press. ISBN 9780917788956.
- Gak, Dae (1997). Going Beyond Buddha: The Awakening Practice of Listening. Charles E. Tuttle. p. 256. ISBN 0-8048-3116-5. OCLC 36386263.

== See also ==
- Furnace Mountain
- Timeline of Zen Buddhism in the United States
- Zen Master Seung Sahn
