= Seungsahn =

Korean Buddhist monk (1927–2004)

Seungsahn 숭산
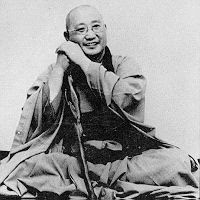
- Seungsahn (1927–2004)
- Title: Dae Jongsa - Seonsanim (Great Zen Master)

Personal life
- Born: Dok-In Lee / 이덕인 / 李德仁; August 1, 1927 Sunchon, occupied Korea (now Sunchon, North Korea)
- Died: November 30, 2004 (aged 77) Hwagaesa, Seoul, South Korea
- Education: Dongguk University
- Other names: Dae Soensa-nim; Soensa-nim

Religious life
- Religion: Jogye Order of Korean Seon
- School: Kwan Um School of Zen

Senior posting
- Predecessor: Kobong
- Successor: Soenghyang; Chang Sik Kim
- Website: www.kwanumzen.org

Seungsahn Haengwon (Korean: 숭산행원대선사; Hanja: 崇山行願大禪師; RR: Sungsan Haengwon Daeseonsa, August 1, 1927 – November 30, 2004), born Duk-In Lee, was a Korean Seon master of the Jogye Order and founder of the international Kwan Um School of Zen. He was the seventy-eighth Patriarch in his lineage. As one of the early Korean Zen masters to settle in the United States, he opened many temples and practice groups across the globe. He was known for his charismatic style and direct presentation of Zen, which was well tailored for the Western audience.

Known by students for his many correspondences with them through letters, his utilization of dharma combat and expressions such as "only don't know" or "only go straight" in teachings, he was conferred the honorific title of Dae Jong Sa in June 2004 by the Jogye Order for a lifetime of achievements. Considered the highest honor to have bestowed upon one in the order, the title translates "Great Lineage Master" and was bestowed for his establishment of the World Wide Kwan Um School of Zen. He died in November that year at Hwagaesa in Seoul, South Korea, at age 77.

== Early life and education ==
Seung Sahn was born in 1927 as Duk-In Lee (modern romanisation: Yi Deog'in) in Sunchon (순천), South Pyongan Province of occupied Korea (now North Korea) to Presbyterian parents. In 1944, he joined an underground resistance movement in response to the ongoing occupation of Korea by the Empire of Japan. He was captured by Japanese police shortly after, avoided a death sentence, and spent time in prison. Upon his release, he studied Western philosophy at Dongguk University. One day, a monk friend of his lent him a copy of the Diamond Sutra. While reading the text, he became inspired to ordain as a monk and left school, receiving the prātimokṣa precepts in 1948. Seung Sahn then performed a one-hundred day solitary retreat in the mountains of Korea, living on a diet of pine needles and rain water. It is believed he attained enlightenment on this retreat.

While seeking out a teacher who could confirm his enlightenment, he found Kobong, who told him to keep a not-knowing mind. In the fall of 1948, Seung Sahn learned dharma combat while sitting a one-hundred day sesshin at Sudeoksa—where he was known to stir up mischief, nearly being expelled from the monastery. After the sesshin was concluded, he received dharma transmission (inka) from two masters, Keumbong and Keum'oh. He then went to see Kobong, who confirmed Seungsahn's enlightenment on January 25, 1949, and gave him dharma transmission as well. Seung Sahn is the only person Kobong gave Dharma transmission to. He spent the next three years in observed silence.

== Career ==
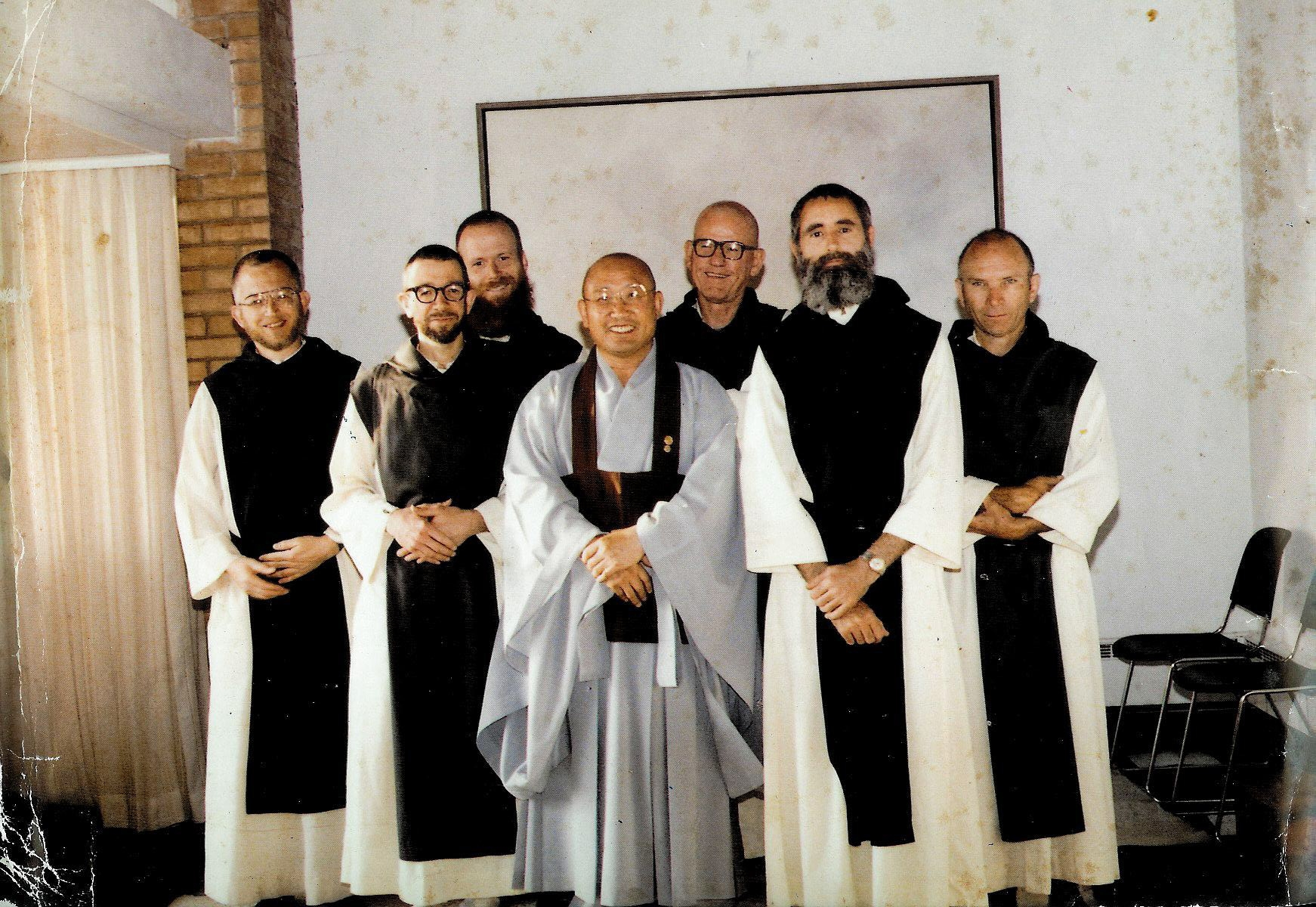
Seungsahn with monks from the Abbey of Our Lady of Gethsemani

Drafted into the Republic of Korea Army in 1953, he served as an army chaplain and then as a captain for almost five years, taking over for Kobong as abbot of Hwagaesa in Seoul, South Korea in 1957. In the next decade, he would go on to found Buddhist temples in Hong Kong and Japan. While in Japan, he was acquainted with the kōan (Korean gong'an) tradition of the Rinzai school of Zen, likely undergoing kōan study with a Rinzai master.

Coming to the United States in 1972, he settled in Providence, Rhode Island and worked at a laundromat as a repairman, spending much of his off time improving upon his English. Shortly after arriving, he found his first students at nearby Brown University, most of whom came by way of a recommendation from a professor there. Among these first students was Jacob Perl (Wubong), who helped to found the Providence Zen Center with the others.

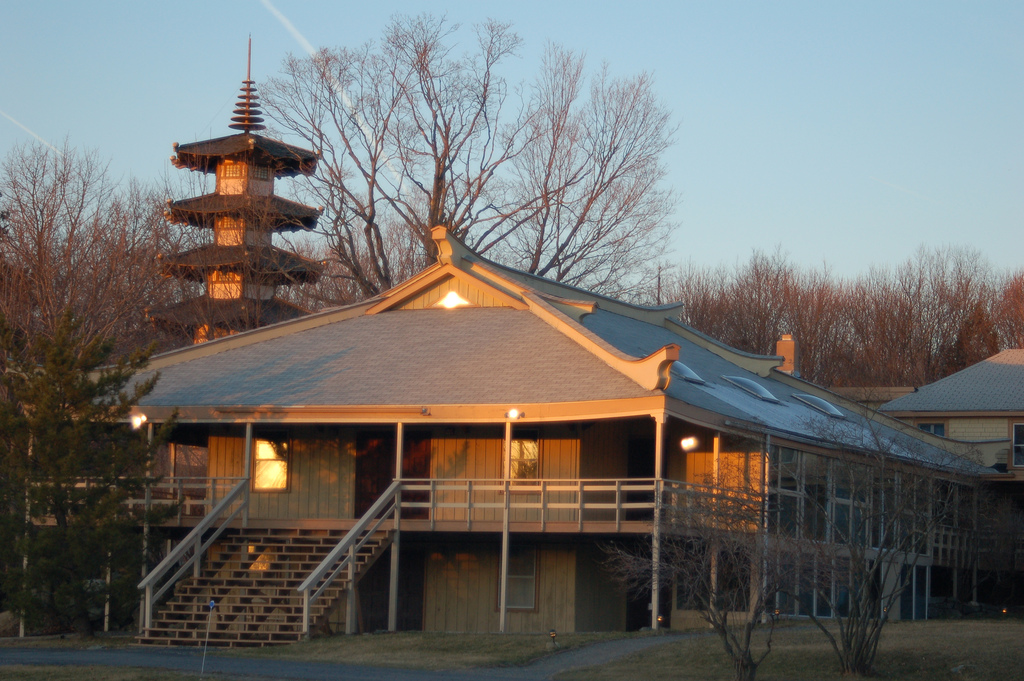
The Providence Zen Center in Cumberland, Rhode Island.

In 1974, Seung Sahn began founding more Zen centers in the United States—his school still yet to be established—beginning with Dharma Zen Center in Los Angeles—a place where laypeople and the ordained could practice and live together. That following year, he went on to found the Chogye International Zen Center of New York City, and then, in 1977, Empty Gate Zen Center. Meanwhile, in 1979, the Providence Zen Center moved from its location in Providence to its current space in Cumberland, Rhode Island.

The Kwan Um School of Zen was founded in 1983 and, unlike more traditional practice in Korea, Seungsahn allowed laypersons in the lineage to wear the robes of full monastics, upsetting some in the Jogye Order by allowing lay Dharma teachers to wear long robes.

Celibacy was not required and the rituals of the school are unique. Although the Kwan Um School does utilize traditional Seon and Zen rituals, elements of their practice also closely resemble rituals found often in Pure Land Buddhism, Chan Buddhism, and the Huayan school. In 1986, along with a former student and Dharma heir Dae Gak, Seungsahn founded a retreat center and temple in Clay City, Kentucky called Furnace Mountain—the temple name being Kwan Se Um San Ji Sah (or, Perceive World Sound High Ground Temple). The center functions independently of the Kwan Um organization today.

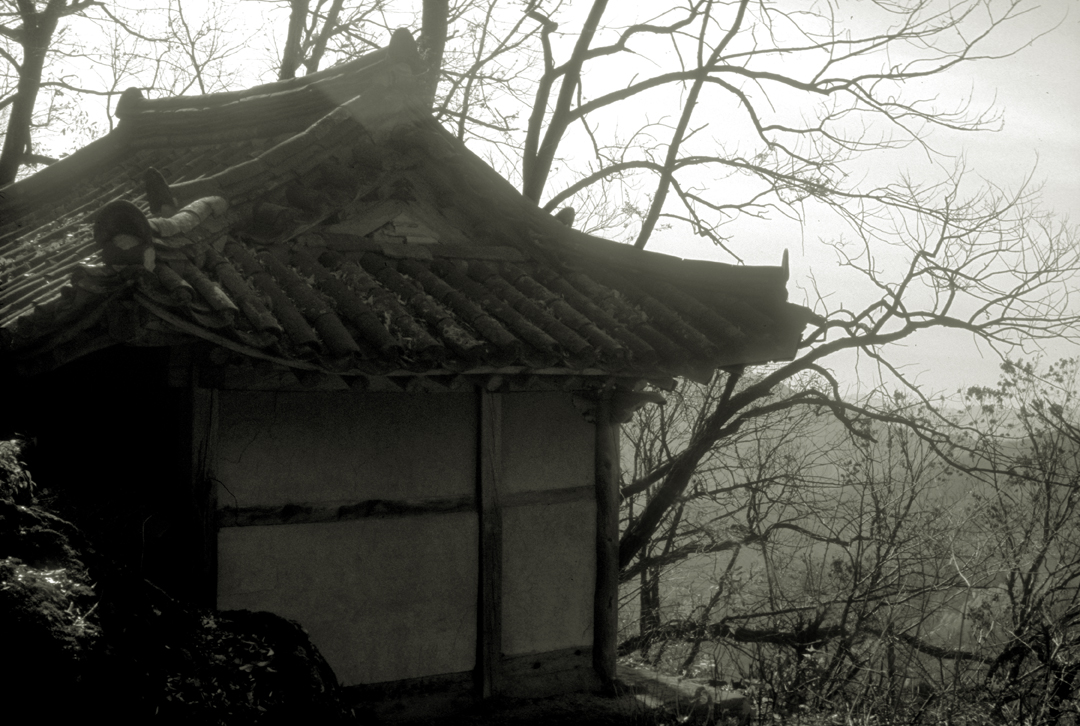
Seungsahn's Hermitage - The place of his one-hundred day solitary retreat

Over his tenure as Guiding Teacher, Seungsahn appointed many Dharma heirs. He created the title Ji Do Poep Sa Nim (JDPSN) for those not ready for full dharma transmission but capable of teaching at a higher capacity. In 1977, Seungsahn was hospitalized for cardiac arrhythmia and it was then discovered that he had advanced diabetes. He had been in and out of hospitals for heart complications for years preceding his death, and in 1987 began spending much less time at his residence in the Providence Zen Center.

Starting in 1990, and under invitation from Mikhail Gorbachev, Seungsahn began making trips to the Soviet Union to teach. His student, Myong Gong Sunim, later opened a practice center in the country (Novgorod Center of Zen Meditation).

=== Teaching style ===
Seungsahn implemented the use of simple phraseology to convey his messages, delivered with charisma, which helped make the teachings easier to consume for Western followers. Some of his more frequently employed phrases included "only go straight" or "only don't know". He even went so far as to call his teachings "Don't Know Zen", which was reminiscent of the style of Bodhidharma. Seungsahn used correspondences between him and his students as teaching opportunities. Back-and-forth letters allowed for a kind of dharma combat through the mail and made him more available to the school's students in his absence. This was another example of his skillful implementation of unorthodox teaching methods, adapting to the norms of Western culture and thus making himself more accessible to those he taught. He was a supporter of what he often termed "together action"—encouraging students to make the lineage's centers their home and practice together.

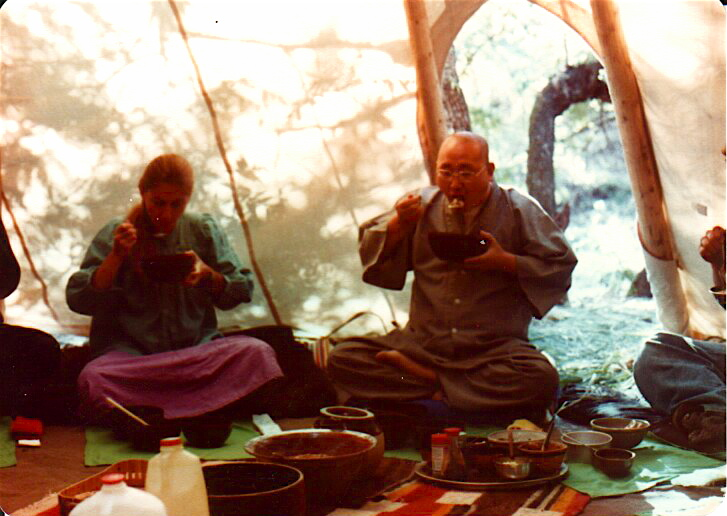
Joan Halifax with Seungsahn at a sesshin at the Ojai Foundation in 1979.

Seungsahn also developed his own kōan study program for students of the Kwan Um School, known today as the "Twelve Gates". These twelve kōans are a mixture of ancient cases and cases which he developed. Before receiving inka to teach (in Kwan Um, inka is not synonymous with Dharma transmission), students must complete the Twelve Gates, though often they will complete hundreds more. One of the more well known cases of the Twelve Gates is "Dropping Ashes on the Buddha", the Sixth Gate, which is also the title of one of his books. In the book The Compass of Zen, this kong-an is transcribed as follows: "Somebody comes to the Zen center smoking a cigarette. He blows smoke and drops ashes on the Buddha." Seungsahn then poses the question, "If you are standing there at that time, what can you do?" Not included in this version of the kōan is the Kwan Um School of Zen's following side note on the case, "[H]ere is an important factor in this case that has apparently never been explicitly included in its print versions. Zen Master Seung Sahn has always told his students that the man with the cigarette is also very strong and that he will hit you if he doesn't approve of your response to his actions."

When Seungsahn first began teaching in the United States, there was an underemphasis in his message on the significance of zazen. Under advice from some students, however, he soon came to incorporate zazen into the curriculum more frequently. More than a few of his earliest students had practiced Zen previously under the Sōtō priest Shunryū Suzuki, laying out a convincing argument about how zazen and Zen were seen as inseparable in the Western psyche.

== Later life ==
Throughout the 1990s, Seung Sahn made trips to Israel, which led to the 1999 opening of the Tel Aviv Zen Center. His remaining years were spent in particularly poor health. He had a pacemaker put in his chest in 2000, followed by renal failure in 2002. In June 2004, he was given the honorific title Dae Jong Sa "Great Lineage Master" by the Jogye Order in commemoration of his accomplishments, the highest title the order can grant.

=== Death ===
Seung Sahn died on November 30, 2004, at the age of 77 in Seoul, South Korea at Hwagaesa, the first temple where he served as abbot.

== Affairs with students ==
In 1988, Seung Sahn admitted to having sexual relationships with several students. Because Seung Sahn was understood to be a celibate monk, the revelation of the affairs caused some members to leave the school. Seung Sahn did two repentance ceremonies and the Kwan Um School of Zen has since developed an ethics policy that has guidelines for teacher/student relationships and consequences for unethical behavior.

== Seung Sahn's lineage ==
The following list documents Seung-Sahn Haeng-Won's transmission lineage, starting with the Buddha and the First Patriarch.

India

	Sanskrit	Chinese	Vietnamese	Japanese	Korean
1	Mahākāśyapa	摩訶迦葉 / Móhējiāyè	Ma-Ha-Ca-Diếp	Makakashō	마하가섭 / Mahagasŏp
2	Ānanda	阿難陀 (阿難) / Ānántuó (Ānán)	A-Nan-Đà (A-Nan)	Ananda Buddha (Anan)	아난다 (아난) / Ananda Buddha (Anan)
3	Śānavāsa	商那和修 / Shāngnàhéxiū	Thương-Na-Hòa-Tu	Shōnawashu	상나화수 / Sangnahwasu
4	Upagupta	優婆掬多 / Yōupójúduō	Ưu-Ba-Cúc-Đa	Ubakikuta	우바국다 / Upakukta
5	Dhrtaka	提多迦 / Dīduōjiā	Đề-Đa-Ca	Daitaka	제다가 / Chedaga
6	Miccaka	彌遮迦 / Mízhējiā	Di-Dá-Ca	Mishaka	미차가 / Michaga
7	Vasumitra	婆須密 (婆須密多) / Póxūmì (Póxūmìduō)	Bà-Tu-Mật (Bà-Tu-Mật-Đa)	Bashumitsu (Bashumitta)	바수밀다 / Pasumilta
8	Buddhanandi	浮陀難提 / Fútuónándī	Phật-Đà-Nan-Đề	Buddanandai	불타난제 / Pŭltananje
9	Buddhamitra	浮陀密多 / Fútuómìduō	Phục-Đà-Mật-Đa	Buddamitta	복태밀다 / Puktaemilda
10	Pārśva	波栗濕縛 / 婆栗濕婆 (脅尊者) / Bōlìshīfú / Pólìshīpó (Xiézūnzhě)	Ba-Lật-Thấp-Phược / Bà-Lật-Thấp-Bà (Hiếp-Tôn-Giả)	Barishiba (Kyōsonja)	파률습박 (협존자) / P'ayulsŭppak (Hyŏpjonje)
11	Punyayaśas	富那夜奢 / Fùnàyèshē	Phú-Na-Dạ-Xa	Funayasha	부나야사 / Punayasa
12	Ānabodhi / Aśvaghoṣa	阿那菩提 (馬鳴) / Ānàpútí (Mǎmíng)	A-Na-Bồ-Đề (Mã-Minh)	Anabotei (Memyō)	아슈바고샤 (마명) / Asyupakosya (Mamyŏng)
13	Kapimala	迦毘摩羅 / Jiāpímóluó	Ca-Tỳ-Ma-La	Kabimora (Kabimara)	가비마라 / Kabimara
14	Nāgārjuna	那伽閼剌樹那 (龍樹) / Nàqiéèlàshùnà (Lóngshù)	Na-Già-Át-Lạt-Thụ-Na (Long-Thọ)	Nagaarajuna (Ryūju)	나가알랄수나 (용수) / Nakaallalsuna (Yongsu)
15	Āryadeva / Kānadeva	迦那提婆 / Jiānàtípó	Ca-Na-Đề-Bà	Kanadaiba	가나제바 / Kanajeba
16	Rāhulata	羅睺羅多 / Luóhóuluóduō	La-Hầu-La-Đa	Ragorata	라후라다 / Rahurada
17	Sanghānandi	僧伽難提 / Sēngqiénántí	Tăng-Già-Nan-Đề	Sōgyanandai	승가난제 / Sŭngsananje
18	Sanghayaśas	僧伽舍多 / Sēngqiéshèduō	Tăng-Già-Da-Xá	Sōgyayasha	가야사다 / Kayasada
19	Kumārata	鳩摩羅多 / Jiūmóluóduō	Cưu-Ma-La-Đa	Kumorata (Kumarata)	구마라다 / Kumarada
20	Śayata / Jayata	闍夜多 / Shéyèduō	Xà-Dạ-Đa	Shayata	사야다 / Sayada
21	Vasubandhu	婆修盤頭 (世親) / Póxiūpántóu (Shìqīn)	Bà-Tu-Bàn-Đầu (Thế-Thân)	Bashubanzu (Sejin)	바수반두 (세친) / Pasubandu (Sechin)
22	Manorhitajuna	摩拏羅 / Mónáluó	Ma-Noa-La	Manura	마나라 / Manara
23	Haklenayaśas	鶴勒那 (鶴勒那夜奢) / Hèlènà (Hèlènàyèzhě)	Hạc-Lặc-Na	Kakurokuna (Kakurokunayasha)	학륵나 / Haklŭkna
24	Simhabodhi	師子菩提 / Shīzǐpútí	Sư-Tử-Bồ-Đề / Sư-Tử-Trí	Shishibodai	사자 / Saja
25	Vasiasita	婆舍斯多 / Póshèsīduō	Bà-Xá-Tư-Đa	Bashashita	바사사다 / Pasasada
26	Punyamitra	不如密多 / Bùrúmìduō	Bất-Như-Mật-Đa	Funyomitta	불여밀다 / Punyŏmilta
27	Prajñātāra	般若多羅 / Bōrěduōluó	Bát-Nhã-Đa-La	Hannyatara	반야다라 / Panyadara
28	Dharmayana / Bodhidharma	Ta Mo / 菩提達磨	Đạt-Ma / Bồ-Đề-Đạt-Ma	Daruma / Bodaidaruma	Tal Ma /보리달마 / Poridalma]

China

	CHINESE NAME	LIFE DATES	VIỆT NAME	JAPANESE NAME	KOREAN NAME
28 / 1	達磨 / Ta-mo	?	Đạt-Ma	Daruma	달마 / Dal-Ma
29 / 2	慧可 / Hui-k'o	487–593	Huệ-Khả	Eka	혜가 / Hye-Ga
30 / 3	僧璨 / Seng-ts'an	?–606	Tăng-Xán	Sōsan	승찬 / Seung-Chan
31 / 4	道信 / Tao-hsin	580–651	Đạo-Tín	Dōshin	도신 / Do-Shim
32 / 5	弘忍 / Hung-jen	601/2–674/5	Hoằng-Nhẫn	Kōnin	홍인 / Hong-Ihn
33 / 6	慧能 / Hui-neng	638–713	Huệ-Năng	Enō	혜능 / Hye-Neung
34 / 7	南嶽懷讓 / Nan-yüeh Huai-jang	677–744	Nam-Nhạc Hoài-Nhượng	Nangaku Ejō	남악회양 / Nam-Ak Hwe-Yang
35 / 8	馬祖道一 / Ma-tsu Tao-i	709–788	Mã-Tổ Đạo-Nhất	Baso Dōitsu	마조도일 / Ma-Jo To-Il
36 / 9	百丈懷海 / Pai-chang Huai-hai	720?/749?–814	Bách-Trượng Hoài-Hải	Hyakujō Ekai	백장회해 / Paek-Chang Hwe-Hae
37 / 10	黃蘗希運 / Huang-po Hsi-yün	?–850	Hoàng-Bá Hy-Vận	Ōbaku Kiun	황벽희운 / Hwang-Byeok Heu-Iun
38 / 11	臨濟義玄 / Lin-chi I-hsüan	?–866/7	Lâm-Tế Nghĩa-Huyền	Rinzai Gigen	임제의현 / Im-Je Eui-Hyeon
39 / 12	興化存奬 / Hsing-hua Tzun-chiang	830–888	Hưng-Hóa Tồn-Tương	Kōke Sonshō	흥화존장 / Heung-Hwa Chon-Jang
40 / 13	南院道癰 / Nan-yüan Hui-yung	d 930?/952?	Nam-Viện Huệ-Ngung	Nanin Egyō	남원도옹 / Nam-Weon To-Ong
41 / 14	風穴延沼 / Feng-hsüeh Yen-chao	896–973	Phong-Huyệt Diên-Chiểu	Fūketsu Enshō	풍혈연소 / Peung-Hyeol Yeon-So
42 / 15	首山省念 / Shou-shan Shen-nien	925/6–992/3	Thủ-Sơn Tỉnh-Niệm	Shūzan Shōnen	수산성념 / Su-San Seong-Nyeom
43 / 16	汾陽善昭 / Fen-yang Shan-chao	947–1024	Phần-Dương Thiện-Chiêu	Funyō Zenshō	분양선소 / Pun-Yang Seon-Jo
44 / 17	慈明楚圓 / Tz'u-ming Ch'u-yüan	986–1039	Thạch-Sương Sở-Viên	Jimyō Soen	자명초원 / Cham-Yeong Cho-Weon
45 / 18	楊岐方會 / Yang-ch'i Fang-hui	992–1049	Dương-Kỳ Phương-Hội	Yōgi Hōe	양기방회 / Yang-Gi Pang-Hwe
46 / 19	白雲守端 / Pai-yün Shou-tuan	1025–1072	Bạch-Vân Thủ-Đoan	Hakuun Shutan	백운수단 / Pae-Gun Su-Dan
47 / 20	五祖法演 / Wu-tsu Fa-yen	1024–1104	Ngũ-Tổ Pháp-Diễn	Goso Hōen	오조법연 / O-Jo Peob-Yeon
48 / 21	圓悟克勤 / Yuan-wu K'o-ch'in	1063–1135	Viên-Ngộ Khắc-Cần	Engo Kokugon	원오극근 / Hwe-O Keuk-Keun
49 / 22	虎丘紹隆 / Hsü-ch’iu Shao-lung	1077–1136	Hổ-Khâu Thiệu-Long	Kukyū Jōryū	호구소융 / Ho-Gu Sor-Yung
50 / 23	應庵曇華 / Ying-an T'an-hua	1103–1163	Ứng Am Đàm Hoa	Oan Donge	응암담화 / Eung-Am Tam-Hwa
51 / 24	密庵咸傑 / Mi-an Hsi-chieh	1118?/1138?–1186	Mật Am Hàm Kiệt	Mittan Kanketsu	밀암함걸 / Mir-Am Ham-Keol
52 / 25	破庵祖先 / P'o-an Tsu-hsien	1136–1211	Phá Am Tổ Tiên	Hoan Sosen	파암조선 / Pa-Am Cho-Seon
53 / 26	無準圓照 / Wu-chun Yuan-chao (無準師範 / Wu-chun Shih-fan)	1174/8–1249	. (Vô Chuẩn Sư Phạm)	. (Mujun Shiban)	무준원조 / Mujun Wenjo (무준사범 / Mujun Sabeom)
54 / 27	雪巖惠朗 / Hsüeh-yen Hui-lang		Tuyết Nham Tổ Khâm	Setsugan	설암혜랑 / Seon-Am Hye-Rang
55 / 28	及庵宗信 / Chi-an Tsung-hsin		Cật Yêm Tông Hâm		급암종신 / Keu-Bam Chong-Sil
56 / 29	石屋淸珙 / Shih-wu Ch'ing-kung	1272–1352	Thạch Ốc Thanh Củng	Sekioku Seikyō	석옥청공 / Seo-Gok Cheong-Gong

Korea

	CHINESE NAME	KOREAN NAME	LIFE DATES
57 / 30 / 1	太古普愚 (Tàigǔ Pǔyú)	태고보우 / Tae-Go Bo-Wu	1301–1382
58 / 31 / 2	幻庵混修 (Huànān Hùnxiū)	환암혼수 / Hwan-Am Hon-Su	1320–1392
59 / 32 / 3	龜谷覺雲 (Guīgǔ Juéyún)	구곡각운 / Gu-Gok Gak-Un	
60 / 33 / 4	碧溪淨心 (Bìxī Jìngxīn)	벽계정심 / Byeok-Ge Jeong-Shim	
61 / 34 / 5	碧松智嚴 (Bìsōng Zhìyán)	벽송지엄 / Byeok-Song Ji-Eom	1464–1534
62 / 35 / 6	芙蓉靈觀 (Fúróng Língguān)	부용영관 / Bu-Yong Yeong-Gwan	1485–1567/1571
63 / 36 / 7	淸虛休靜 (Qīngxū Xiūjìng)	청허휴정 / Cheong-Heo Hyu-Jeong (서산대사 / Seo-San Dae-Sa)	1520–1604
64 / 37 / 8	鞭羊彦機 (Biānyáng Yànjī)	편양언기 / Pyeon-Yang Eon-Gi	1581–1644
65 / 38 / 9	楓潭義諶 (Fēngtán Yìchén)	풍담의심 / Pung-Dam Eui-Sim	?–1665
66 / 39 / 10	月潭雪霽 (Yuètán Xuějì)	월담설제 / Wol-Dam Seol-Je	?–1704
67 / 40 / 11	喚惺志安 (Huànxīng Zhìān)	환성지안 / Hwan-Seong Ji-An	?–1729
68 / 41 / 12	虎巖體淨 (Hǔyán Tǐjìng)	호암체정 / Ho-Am Che-Jeong	?–1748
69 / 42 / 13	靑峰巨岸 (Qīngfēng Jùàn)	청봉거안 / Cheong-Bong Geo-An	
70 / 43 / 14	栗峰靑古 (Lìfēng Qīnggǔ)	율봉청고 / Yul-Bong Cheong-Kwa	?–1823
71 / 44 / 15	錦虛法沾 (Jǐnxū Fǎzhān)	금허법첨 / Geum-Heo Beop-Cheom	
72 / 45 / 16	龍岩慧彦 (Lóngyán Huìyàn)	용암혜언 / Yong-Am Hye-Eon	
73 / 46 / 17	永月奉律 (Yǒngyuè Fènglù)	영월봉율 / Yeong-Wol Bong-Yul	
74 / 47 / 18	萬化普善 (Wànhuà Pǔshàn)	만화보선 / Man-Hwa Bo-Seon	?–1879
75 / 48 / 19	鏡虛惺牛 (Jìngxū Xīngniú)	경허성우 / Gyeong-Heo Seong-Wu	1849–1912
76 / 49 / 20	滿空月面 (Mǎnkòng Yuèmiàn)	만공월면 / Man-Gong Weol-Myeon	1871–1946
77 / 50 / 21	高峯景昱 (Gāofēng Jǐngyù)	고봉경욱 / Ko-Bong Gyeong-Uk	1890–1961/2
78 / 51 / 22	崇山行願 (Chóngshān Xíngyuàn)	숭산행원 / Seung-Sahn Haeng-Won	1927–2004

== Dharma heirs ==
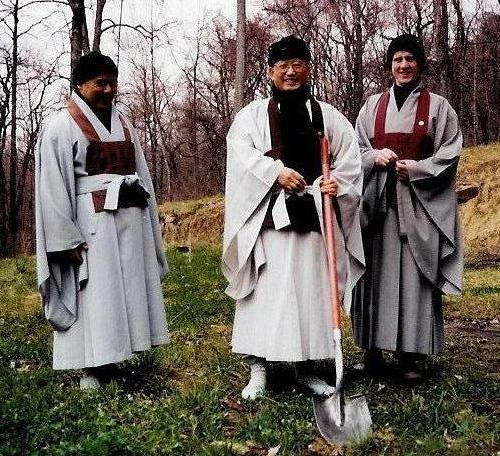
Su Bong, DSS, and Dae Gak

- Bo Mun
- Bon Yeon
- Chong An
- Dae Bong
- Dae Gak
- Dae Kwang
- Hae Kwang
- Soeng Hyang
- Su Bong
- Won Gwang
- Wu Bong
- Wu Kwang
- Ji Haeng
- Ji Bong

== Bibliography ==
- Gak, Hyon (2006). Wanting Enlightenment Is a Big Mistake: Teachings of Zen Master Seung Sahn. Shambhala Publications. ISBN 1-59030-340-7. OCLC 62896424.
- Sahn, Sueng (2003). Zen: The Perfect Companion (Perfect Companions! Series). Black Dog & Leventhal Publishing. ISBN 1-57912-279-5. OCLC 52075077.
- Seung Sahn; Hyon Gak (1997). The Compass of Zen. Shambhala Publications. ISBN 1-57062-329-5. OCLC 123275104.
- Sahn, Seung; Hyon Gak (1992). The Whole World Is a Single Flower. C. E. Tuttle Company. ISBN 0-585-06104-1. OCLC 42855442.
- Sahn, Seung (1987). Ten Gates: The Kong-An Teaching of Zen Master Seung Sahn. Primary Point Press. ISBN 0-942795-01-6. OCLC 40618475.
- Kwan Um School of Zen (1987). Only Doing It For Sixty Years. Kwan Um School of Zen. OCLC 39712155.
- Sahn, Seung (1985). Zen Dialogue in China. Hong Bup Won Publishing.
- Sahn, Seung (1983). Chanting with English Translations and Temple Rules. Kwan Um School of Zen. OCLC 79625070.
- Sahn, Seung; Stanley Lombardo (1982). Bone of Space: Poems. Four Seasons Foundation. ISBN 0-87704-053-2. OCLC 8281660.
- Sahn, Seung; David O'Neal (1982). Only Don't Know: Selected Teaching Letters of Zen Master Seung. Primary Point Press. ISBN 0-942795-03-2. OCLC 28576745.
- Sahn, Seung; Stephen Mitchell (1976). Dropping Ashes on the Buddha. Grove Press. ISBN 0-8021-3052-6. OCLC 505759099.

== Other media ==
=== Audio ===
- 2000 Chanting Instructional CD
- Perceive World Sound Zen Chanting CD (from 1978)

=== Video ===
- 1992 Wake Up! On the Road with a Zen Master (DVD and VHS) - Watch on YouTube
- 1993 Sun Rising East (VHS)

== See also ==
- Buddhism in the United States
- Buddhist Patriarch
- The Compass of Zen
- Timeline of Zen Buddhism in the United States
