= George Bowman (Zen master) =

American Buddhist monk

Bo Mun
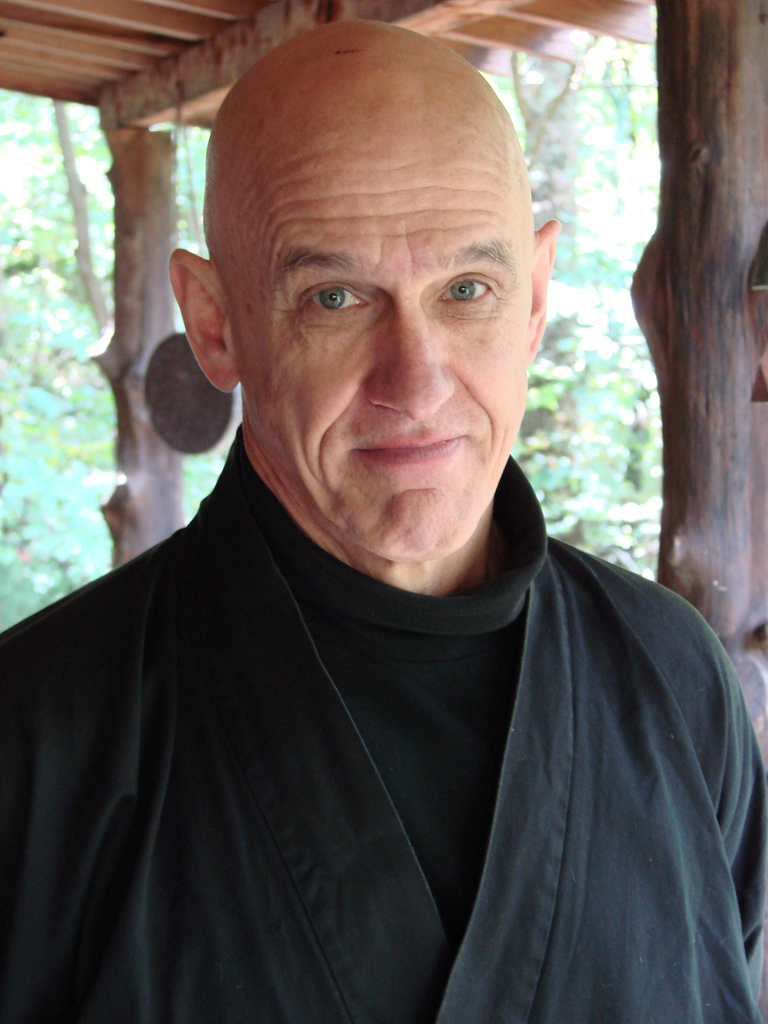
- Title: Soen Sa Nim; Psychotherapist

Personal life
- Born: George Bowman United States

Religious life
- Religion: Zen Buddhism
- Dharma names: Bo Mun

Senior posting
- Predecessor: Seung Sahn
- Website: Single Flower Sangha

George Bowman, or Bo Mun Soen sa Nim, is a Zen master and licensed psychotherapist living at Furnace Mountain in Clay City, Kentucky (he does not teach there). Furnace Mountain is run by Dae Gak Soen Sa Nim—another former Kwan Um line teacher. Bowman received Dharma transmission from Seung Sahn Soen Sa Nim in 1992, and is a former teacher in the Kwan Um School of Zen. He was a founding member of the Providence Zen Center in 1972 and also did koan study with Joshu Sasaki from 1977 to 2003. He was a resident teacher at the Cambridge Buddhist Association from 1991 to 1999, and in 1994 became a guiding teacher of the Institute for Meditation and Psychotherapy. For the past many years, his teaching has taken him regularly to California, Massachusetts, Alabama, Florida, and Washington to lead retreats for the "floating zendo" named Single Flower Sangha. Bowman has given inka to his student David Dayan Rynick, who was the first individual to be acknowledged as a teacher outside of the Kwan Um lineage.

== See also ==
- Single Flower Sangha
- Dae Gak
- Furnace Mountain
- Providence Zen Center
- Kyozan Joshu Sasaki
- List of Rinzai Buddhists
- Timeline of Zen Buddhism in the United States
