= Golden Wind =

Golden Wind may refer to

- Golden Wind (manga), the fifth part of the manga series JoJo's Bizarre Adventure
  - JoJo's Bizarre Adventure: Golden Wind, an anime adaptation of the manga series
- MV Golden Wind, a Hong Kong cargo ship in service during 1966
- The Golden Wind, a historical novel by L. Sprague de Camp, 1969

== See also ==
- Golden Wind Zen Order, an American Zen Buddhist Order
