= The Compass of Zen =

- Cover of the first edition
- Author: Seung Sahn; Hyon Gak
- Language: English
- Subject: Zen Buddhism
- Publisher: Shambhala Publications: Distributed in the United States and Canada by Random House
- Publication date: 1997
- Publication place: United States
- Media type: Print (Paperback)
- Pages: 394
- ISBN: 1-57062-329-5
- OCLC: 36755855
- Dewey Decimal: 294.3/927 21
- LC Class: BQ9266 .S47 1997

The Compass of Zen is a book of teachings by Seung Sahn Soen Sa Nim, a compilation of talks given by him since 1977 that were then edited by his student Hyon Gak (Paul Muenzen). Designed to offer readers an introduction to the teachings of the Mahayana, Hinayana and Zen traditions, an earlier—and more crude—version of the current text had first been drafted by Seung Sahn Soen Sa Nim in the early 1970s. Until it was first published by Shambhala Publications in 1997, much of the material was already being used in the Kwan Um School of Zen curriculum. Rather than pretending to be a work of academia, The Compass of Zen was presented in everyday language for its readership. In addition to coverage of the aforementioned topics, the book also contains Seung Sahn Soen Sa Nim's "The Ten Gates", a glossary of terms, and his lineage chart. "The Ten Gates" is his own kong-an curriculum for students in his Kwan Um lineage, each one being followed by commentary by him in the text. Today there are Twelve Gates.

== See also ==
- Buddhism in the United States
- Timeline of Zen Buddhism in the United States
