= Red Pine (author) =

American author, poet, and translator (born 1943)

- Born: Bill Porter; October 3, 1943 (age 83); Los Angeles, California, United States
- Education: University of California, Santa Barbara; Columbia University
- Occupations: Author; translator; sinologist
- Children: Red Cloud (son, born 1982); Iris (daughter, born 1987)
- Parent: Arnold Porter (father)

Chinese name
- Chinese: 赤松
Transcriptions
Standard Mandarin
- Hanyu Pinyin: Chì Sōng

Bill Porter (born October 3, 1943) is an American writer who translates Chinese texts under the pen-name Red Pine (Chinese: 赤松; pinyin: Chì Sōng). He primarily translates Taoist and Buddhist texts, including poetry and sūtras. In 2018, he won the American Academy of Arts & Letters Thornton Wilder Prize for translation.

== Early life ==
In an interview with Andy Ferguson for Tricycle Magazine in 2000, Red Pine revealed some of the details of his early life. His father, Arnold Porter, grew up on a cotton farm in Arkansas. At an early age, Arnold became part of a notorious bank robbing gang that robbed banks from the south northwards to Michigan. In a shoot out with the police, all the gang members were killed except Porter who was wounded and subsequently sent to prison. Nevertheless, after six years he was pardoned by the governor of Michigan and released; an inheritance from the sale of the family farm allowed him to enter the hotel business and to become a multimillionaire. Arnold moved to Los Angeles, where Bill was born in 1943. Later the family moved to a mountainous area near Coeur D'Alene, Idaho. Arnold Porter became involved in Democratic Party politics and head of the Democratic Party in California, developing close associations with the Kennedy family.

Red Pine's early life was one of wealth and privilege. He and his siblings were sent to elite private schools, but he considered the schools to be phony and too wrapped in wealth, ego, and power. Eventually his father divorced his mother and subsequently they lost everything. While his brother and sister found it difficult to live with less money, Pine was relieved when this happened.

After receiving a draft notice in 1964, he voluntarily enlisted and served a three-year Army tour in Germany. Pine served in Germany for three years as a medical clerk, which paid for his college education at UC Santa Barbara where he obtained a degree in anthropology. When he encountered Buddhism, the tenets were quite clear to him and he understood exactly what it was about. Following graduation, he went on to graduate studies in language (Chinese) and anthropology at Columbia University, but dropped out in 1972 to go to the Fo Guang Shan in Taiwan, a Buddhist monastery. He studied for a year at Fo Guang Shan with master Hsing Yun.

After a year he left and spent the next two and half years at the College of Chinese Culture, a smaller, less crowded monastery outside of Taipei in the mountains, where he became a graduate student in philosophy. He took classes in Taoism, Chinese art, and philosophy; his future wife, Ku, was a classmate. Unhappy with academic life, he left to go to Hai Ming Temple, a monastery 20 km south of Taipei where he stayed for 2 1/2 years. Wu Ming was the head Linji Chan monk, Chiang Kai-Shek's personal master. Here he simply studied and meditated: "I had got hold of all these classic texts with both Chinese and English characters and I went through most of the sutras."

== Writings ==
In the years following, he lived in Taiwan and Hong Kong. After 1989 he traveled extensively in China, both as a journalist and on his own. He adopted a Chinese art name, "Red Pine" (赤松; Chi Song), after the legendary Taoist immortal. In 1993, after 22 years in East Asia, he returned to the US. In 1999 and 2000, he taught Buddhism and Taoism at the City of Ten Thousand Buddhas. He now lives in Port Townsend, Washington.

His book Road to Heaven prompted Edward A. Burger to seek out and study with Buddhist hermits in the Zhongnan Mountains of China and direct the 2005 film Amongst White Clouds.

In 2009, Copper Canyon Press published his translation of Laozi's Tao Te Ching. One of the most noteworthy aspects of this translation is Porter's use of excerpts from China's vast and rich commentarial tradition.

In 2012, he published a translation of the Laṅkāvatāra Sūtra (Lankavatara Sutra: Translation and Commentary. Counterpoint, 2012.) It is based on several early Chinese and Sanskrit translations including the Chinese translation made by Guṇabhadra in 443.

2014 brought a re-translation of The Mountain Poems of Stonehouse (石屋禅师山居诗). Stonehouse (石屋禅师; Shiwu) was a fourteenth century Zen master who wrote his poems late in life while living alone in a Chinese mountain hut.

Yellow River Odyssey is an account in photographs and text of Porter's early 1990s travels along the Yellow River from its mouth at the Yellow Sea to its source in the Tibetan Plateau. Along the way, Porter visited historical religious sites related to Confucius, Mencius, Laozi and Zhuang Zhou. The Chinese version was based on 1991 radio scripts for Hong Kong radio station Metro News.

The Silk Road: Taking the Bus to Pakistan details the author's overland journey with his friend Finn Wilcox from Xi'an to Islamabad by bus, train, and plane. It's a first-person account of scenery, artifacts, and people along the northern route of the Silk Road.

== Works ==
- P’u Ming's Oxherding Pictures and Verses Empty Bowl, 1983. (translator) (see: Ten Bulls)
- Cold Mountain Poems Copper Canyon Press, 1983. (translator) (see: Hanshan (poet))
- Mountain Poems of Stonehouse Empty Bowl, 1985. (translator) (see: Shiwu)
- The Zen Teaching of Bodhidharma Empty Bowl, 1987; North Point Press, 1989. (translator) (see: Bodhidharma)
- Road to Heaven: Encounters with Chinese Hermits Mercury House, 1993. (author)
- Guide to Capturing a Plum Blossom by Sung Po-jen. Mercury House, 1995. (translator)
- Lao-tzu's Taoteching: with Selected Commentaries of the Past 2000 Years Mercury House, 1996. (translator and editor)
- The Zen Works of Stonehouse: Poems and Talks of a Fourteenth-Century Chinese Hermit Mercury House, 1997. (translator) (see: Shiwu)
- The Clouds Should Know Me by Now: Buddhist Poet Monks of China Wisdom Publications, 1998. (editor, with Mike O'Connor; and contributing translator) (see: Jia Dao, Hanshan Deqing)
- The Collected Songs of Cold Mountain Copper Canyon Press, 2000. (translator and editor)
- Diamond Sutra Counterpoint, 2001 (translator and extensive commentary) (see: Diamond Sutra)
- Poems of the Masters: China's Classic Anthology of T'ang and Sung Dynasty Verse Copper Canyon Press, 2003. (translator) (see: Three Hundred Tang Poems)
- The Heart Sutra: the Womb of Buddhas Washington: Shoemaker & Hoard, 2004. (translator with extensive commentary) (see: Heart Sutra)
- The Platform Sutra : the Zen teaching of Hui-neng Counterpoint, 2006. ISBN 978-1-582-43995-2 (translator with extensive commentary) (see: Platform Sutra)
- Zen Baggage: A Pilgrimage to China Counterpoint, 2008. (author)
- In Such Hard Times: The Poetry of Wei Ying-wu Copper Canyon Press, July 1, 2009. (translator). Awarded 2007 PEN Translation Fund Grant from PEN American Center. Winner of the American Literary Translators Association's inaugural Lucien Stryk Asian Translation Prize in 2010. (see: Wei Yingwu)
- Lao-tzu's Taoteching: Translated by Red Pine with selected commentaries from the past 2000 years revised edition, Copper Canyon Press, 2009.
- Guide to Capturing a Plum Blossom by Sung Po-jen Copper Canyon Press, 2011 (translator)
- The Lankavatara Sutra: Translation and Commentary Counterpoint, 2012, (translator)
- The Mountain Poems of Stonehouse Copper Canyon Press, 2014, (translator)
- Yellow River Odyssey Chin Music Press 2014 ISBN 0988769301
- South of the Clouds: Travels in Southwest China. Counterpoint. 2015. ISBN 978-1-61902-719-0. OCLC 914195322.
- Finding Them Gone: Visiting China's Poets of the Past 2015 Copper Canyon Press
- South of the Yangtze: Travels Through the Heart of China. Counterpoint. 2016. ISBN 978-1-61902-734-3. LCCN 2016008978. OCLC 922911728.
- "The Silk Road" Counterpoint 2016 ISBN 978-1-61902-751-0
- "Paradise of the Mind", CITIC Publishing, May 2018, translated by Li Xin
- A Shaman's Lament, Empty Bowl, 2021, (translator). See: Li Sao.
