= Kobong =

Kobong / 고봉 / 高峯
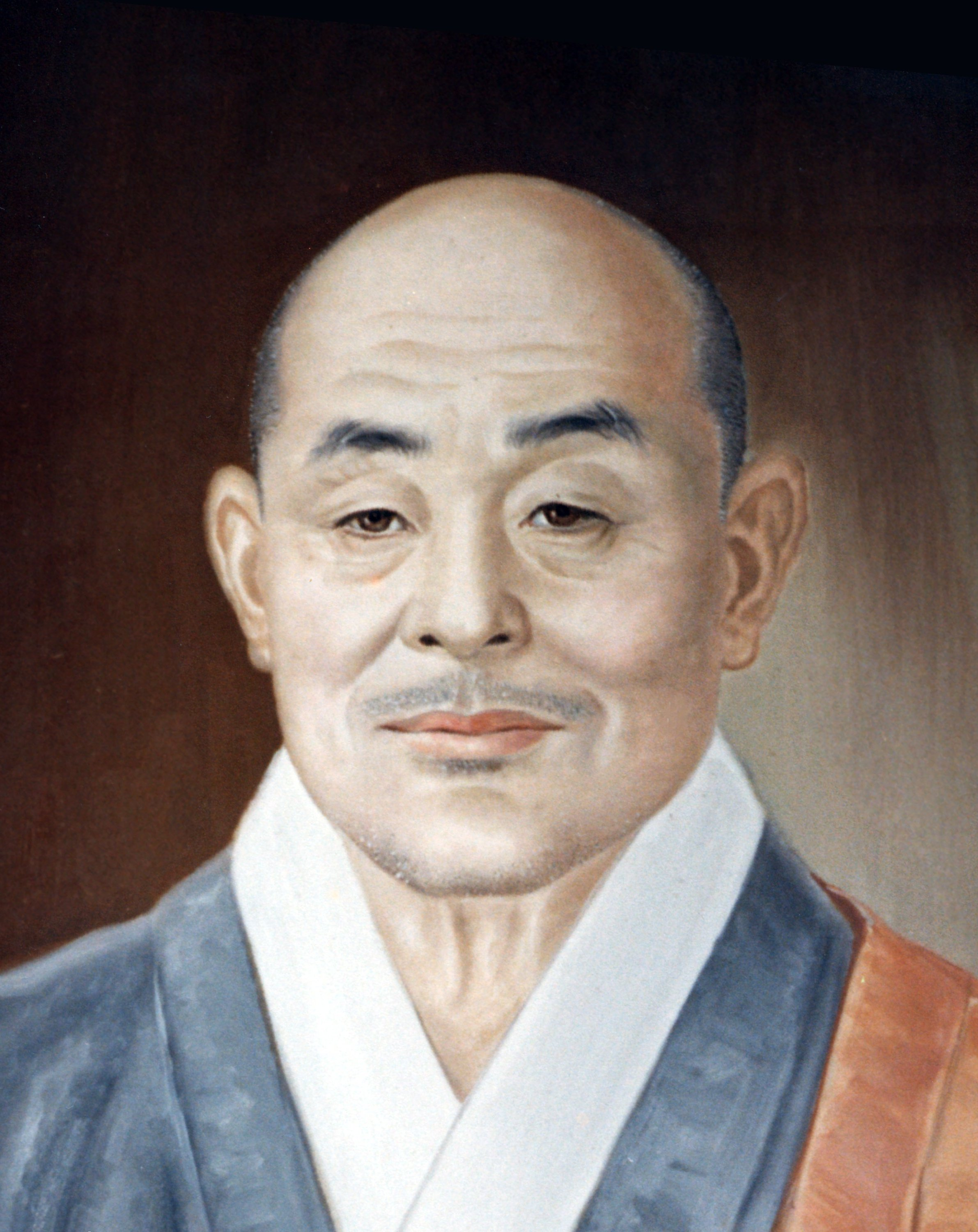
- Title: Zen master

Personal life
- Born: 1890 Korea
- Died: 1962 (aged 71–72)

Religious life
- Religion: Buddhism
- School: Chogye (Seon)

Senior posting
- Predecessor: Mangong
- Successor: Seungsahn

Korean name
- Hangul: 박경욱
- Hanja: 朴景昱
- RR: Bak Gyeonguk
- MR: Pak Kyŏnguk

Dharma name
- Hangul: 고봉
- Hanja: 古峰
- RR: Gobong
- MR: Kobong

Kobong seonsanim (Korean: 고봉선사; Hanja: 高峯禪師; 1890–1962), the 77th Patriarch in his teaching lineage, was a Korean Zen master.

== Biography ==
At an early age, Kobong became a monk at Namjangsa. Known for spontaneous and eccentric teaching, he sometimes said that he preferred to teach laypeople because monks were too lazy to practice hard.

Kobong never held a position at any temple or established a temple of his own. When he was elderly, his student Seungsahn brought him to Hwagyesa in Seoul, South Korea where Kobong died at the temple in 1962. A large granite monument was built in his honor on the hillside overlooking Hwagyesa.

== Lineage ==
Kobong Sunim was Dharma heir to Mangong Sunim, who was in turn Dharma heir to Kyongho Sunim. Kobong Sunim's best known student was Seungsahn Sunim (1927–2004), founder of the Kwan Um School of Zen. Seungsahn Sunim received Dharma transmission from Kobong Sunim at 22 years of age. Kobong had never given inka to any monk before he met Seungsahn Sunim and Seungsahn remained his only dharma heir.

Sunim is a Korean word that means ordained Buddhist and can refer to both men and women who have taken ordination vows.

== See also ==
- Seungsahn
