= Furnace Mountain =

Zen Buddhist retreat center in Kentucky (U.S.)

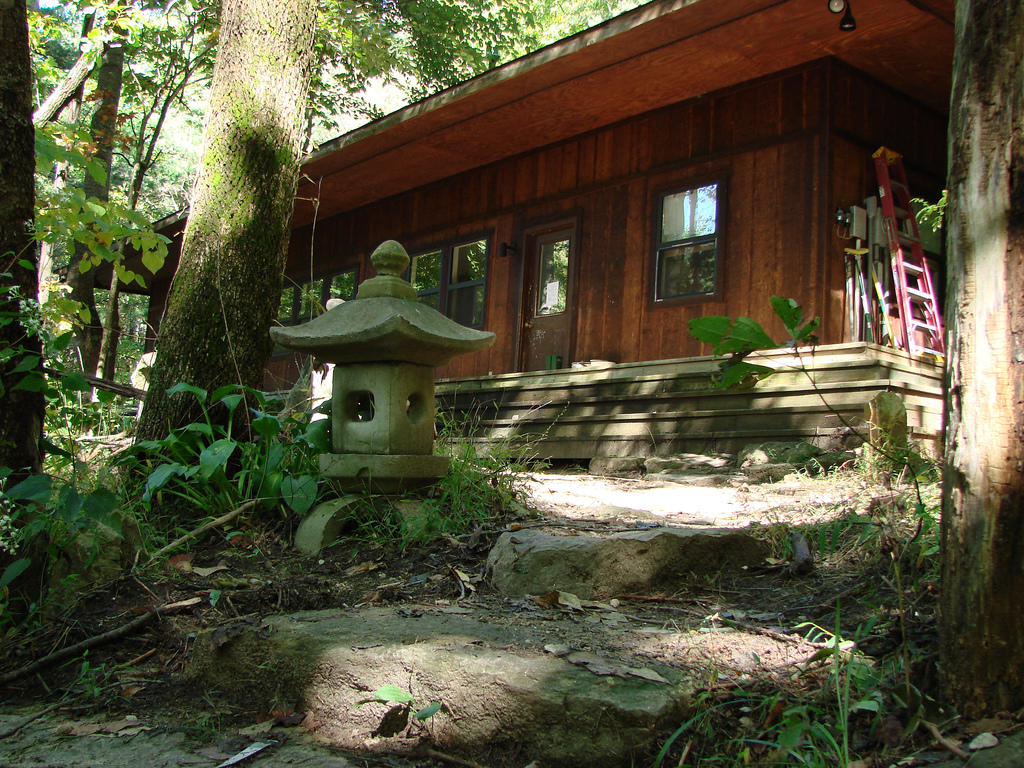
- The Tea House at Furnace Mountain. For group retreats the Tea House has sleeping quarters, showers and bathrooms, a kitchen and eating tables.

Religion
- Affiliation: Zen Buddhism

Location
- Location: P.O. Box 545, Clay City, Kentucky 40312
- Country: United States
- Interactive map of Furnace Mountain
- Coordinates: 37.7695°N 83.8420°W

Architecture
- Founder: Dae Gak Soen Sa Nim; Seung Sahn Soen Sa Nim
- Completed: 1986

Website
- http://www.furnacemountainzen.org

Furnace Mountain (temple name Kwan Se Um San Ji Sah) is an American Zen Buddhist retreat center in Clay City, Kentucky, co-founded in 1986 by Seung Sahn Soen Sa Nim and Dae Gak Soen Sa Nim as part of the international Kwan Um School of Zen; it is now unaffiliated with the school in an official capacity. In 1990 the main Meditation Hall was completed, and in 1994 the temple was constructed and opened. Kwan Se Um San Ji Sah is modeled after a traditional Korean Buddhist Temple—located on 850 acres (263 ha) of woods in part of The Daniel Boone National Forest (in The Red River Gorge area). The exact site of Kwan Se Um San Ji Sah was determined by the use of geomantic divination, which was intended to help foster harmony. The Abbot and guiding teacher is Dae Gak Zen Master.

== Gallery ==
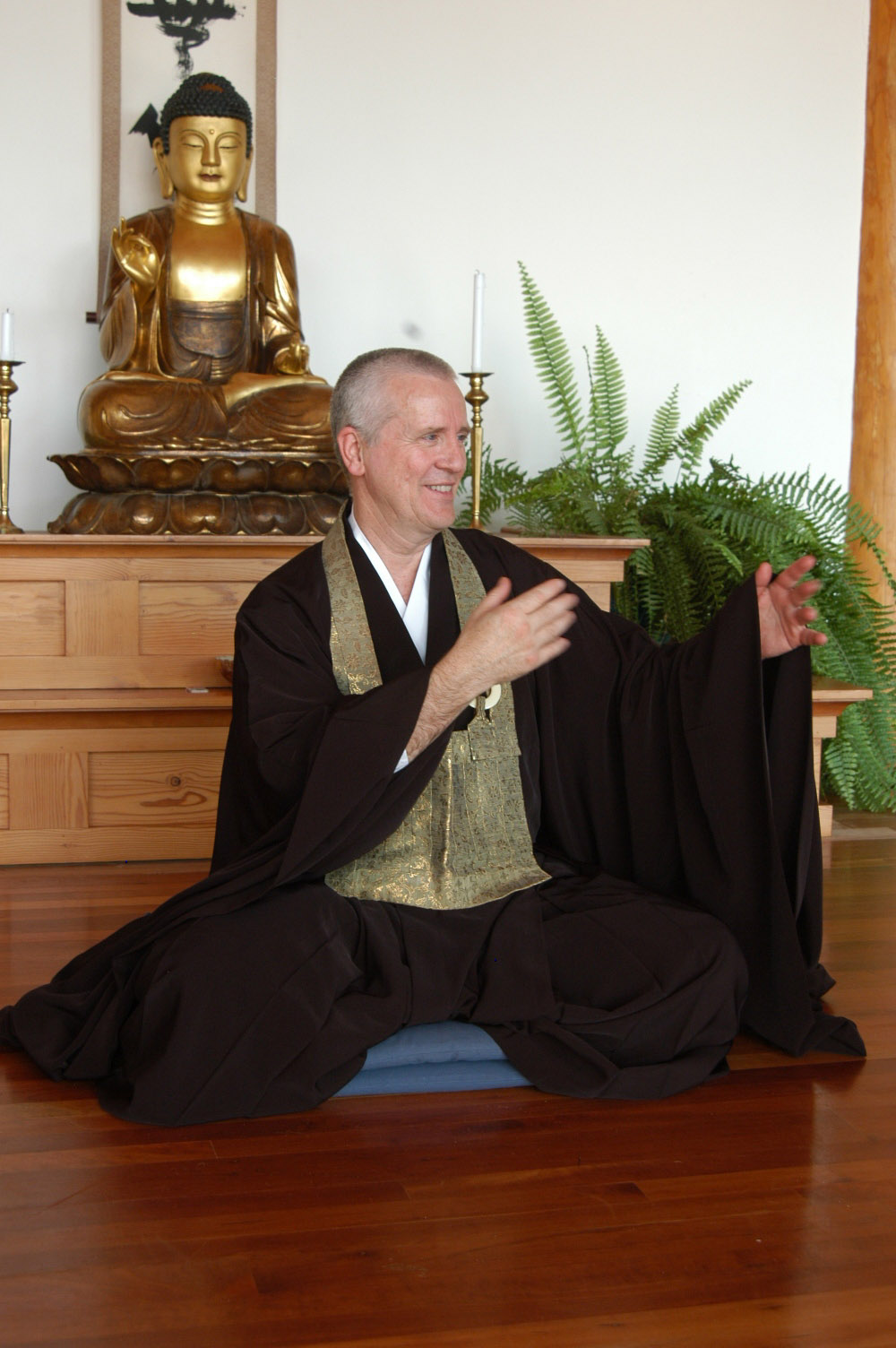
Dae Gak, guiding teacher

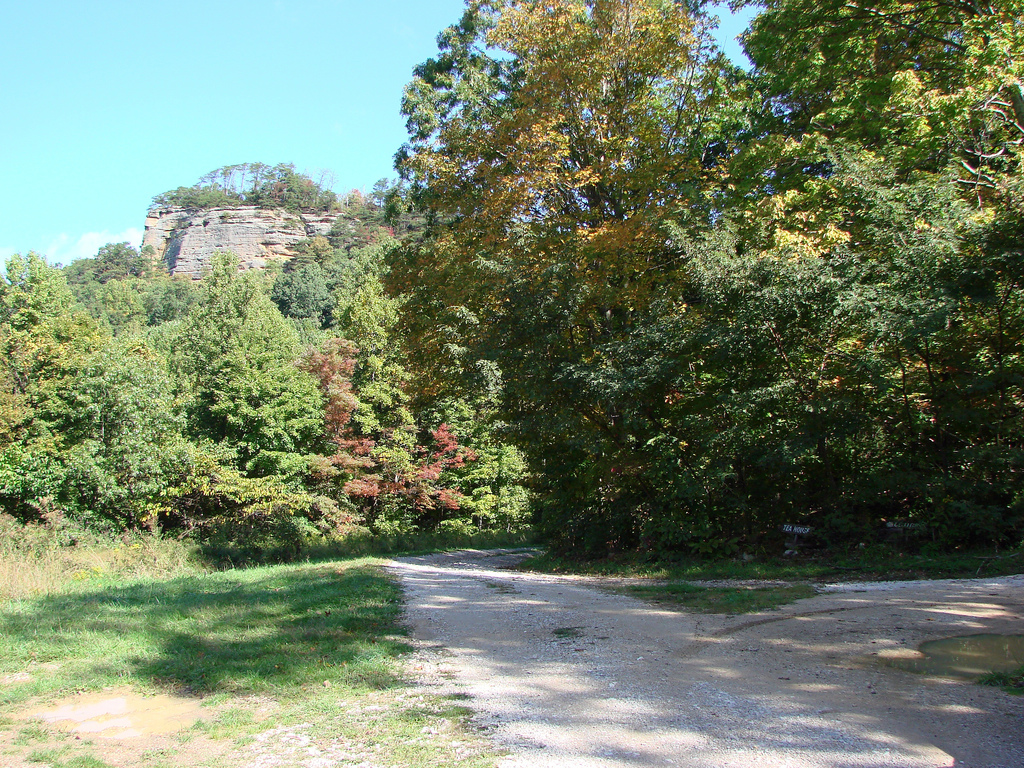
The road leading into the retreat center—you can see the bluff above

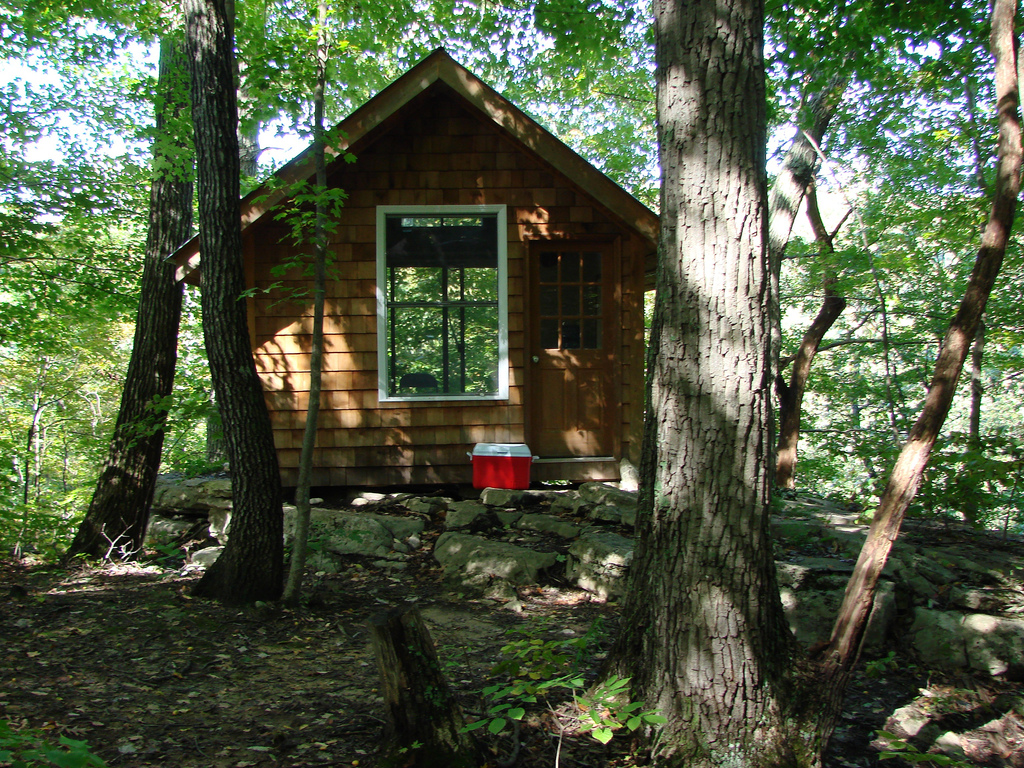
Individual retreat house for guests

== See also ==
- Buddhism in the United States
- Timeline of Zen Buddhism in the United States
