= Golden Wind Zen Order =

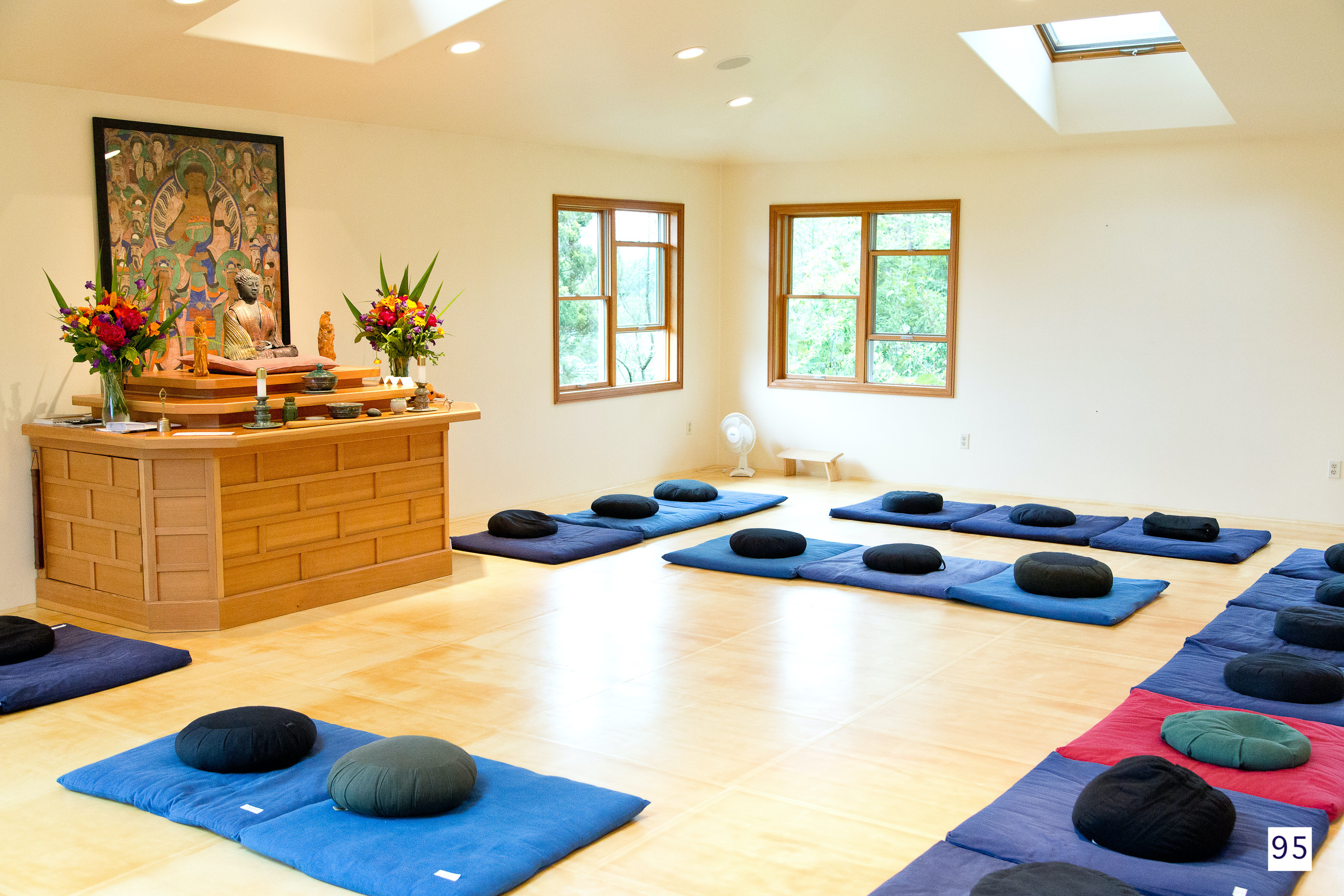
- Dharma Room at Blue Heron Zen Community Dharma Room at Blue Heron Zen Community
- School: Zen (American Zen)
- Founder: Ji Bong (Zen Master Robert Moore)
- Founded: 2004
- Lineage: Seung Sahn and earlier Korean masters of the Jogye Order
- Affiliated centers: Albuquerque, New Mexico Long Beach, California; Seattle, Washington; Online Practice

The Golden Wind Zen Order (GWZO) is an American Zen Buddhist Order with affiliated centers in California, New Mexico, and Washington State, and additional online practice offerings. The affiliated centers of the GWZO are independent Zen centers that practice American Zen, including forms from the Korean Seung Sahn Jogye lineage and Japanese Zen.

== History ==
The GWZO was founded in 2004 by Zen Master Ji Bong (Robert Moore). Moore received dharma transmission in the Kwan Um School of Zen from Zen Master Seung Sahn in 1997. At that time, he was authorized and encouraged to develop a new American Zen tradition.

California. Korean Zen Master Seung Sahn and Robert Moore, his long-time student, founded the Huntington Beach Zen Center in 1993. In 1995 the Center moved to a larger six bedroom house in Stanton. At that time Zen Master Seung Sahn recommended the new name, Ocean Eyes Zen Center.

In 1997, Ocean Eyes Zen Center moved to a residence in Long Beach, California where it was a residential center with several full time resident students. In 2000, the Center moved to another location in Long Beach, CA, and in 2011 relocated to the Signal Hill area of Long Beach. The center was affiliated with the international Kwan Um School of Zen until 2004. In 2004, Moore and the Zen Center membership established the Golden Wind Zen Order as an independent teaching organization (see Ford, 2017).

Seattle. The Dharma Sound Zen Community in Seattle, WA was established in the 1980s under the auspices of the Kwan Um School of Zen, with Zen Master Ji Bong (Moore) as its guiding teacher. After Moore established the GWZO, the Seattle center affiliated with the GWZO. In 2006, Dharma Sound changed its name to the Blue Heron Zen Community, and today operates a practice center with community and residential training in North Seattle. In 2026, Open Sound Zen Community opened a practice location in the Seattle Magnolia neighborhood.

Teaching Lineage. Over two decades, Moore authorized several students as Zen teachers known as Ji Do Poep Sunims (JDPSN, or "Dharma Masters"). These included Jeff Tipp, Eric Nord, and Anita Feng in Seattle; and in California, Ann Pepper in Long Beach, and Tim Colohan (now with the Kwan Um School of Zen).

In 2015, Moore gave full Zen transmission to his first Dharma heir, Zen Master Jeong Ji (Anita Feng) at the Blue Heron Zen Community in Seattle. Jeong Ji is now the Guiding Teacher of the Albuquerque Zen Center. In 2023, Moore gave full Zen transmission to his second Dharma heir, Zen Master Jeong Bong (Eric Nord). Jeong Bong is now the Guiding Teacher of Blue Heron Zen Community.

In 2023, Zen Master Jeong Ji (Anita Feng) gave teaching authorization as JDPSN "Dharma Masters" to Paul Gulick and Chris Chapman in Seattle, WA. Paul Gulick JDPSN is the Abbot of Blue Heron Zen Community in Seattle. Chris Chapman JDPSN organizes the Open Sound Zen Community in Seattle.

== Affiliated Centers ==
- Albuquerque Zen Center, Albuquerque, NM
- Blue Heron Zen Community, Seattle, WA
- Golden Wind Zen Center, Long Beach, CA
- Open Sound Zen Community Seattle, WA
- Tech Community Zen Center Online

== Teaching Hierarchy ==
Teachers and Locations

- Zen Masters
  - Zen Master Ji Bong (Robert Moore), California
  - Zen Master Jeong Ji (Anita Feng), New Mexico
  - Zen Master Jeong Bong (Eric Nord), Washington
- Ji Do Poep Sa teachers (Dharma Masters)
  - Ann Pepper, JDPSN, California
  - Chris Chapman, JDPSN, Washington
  - Paul Gulick, JDPSN, Washington
- In Memoriam
  - Jeff Tipp, JDPSN, California, Died July 31, 2025

== See also ==
- Buddhism in the United States
- Timeline of Zen Buddhism in the United States
