= Prajnatara =

Zen Buddhist teacher

Prajñātārā
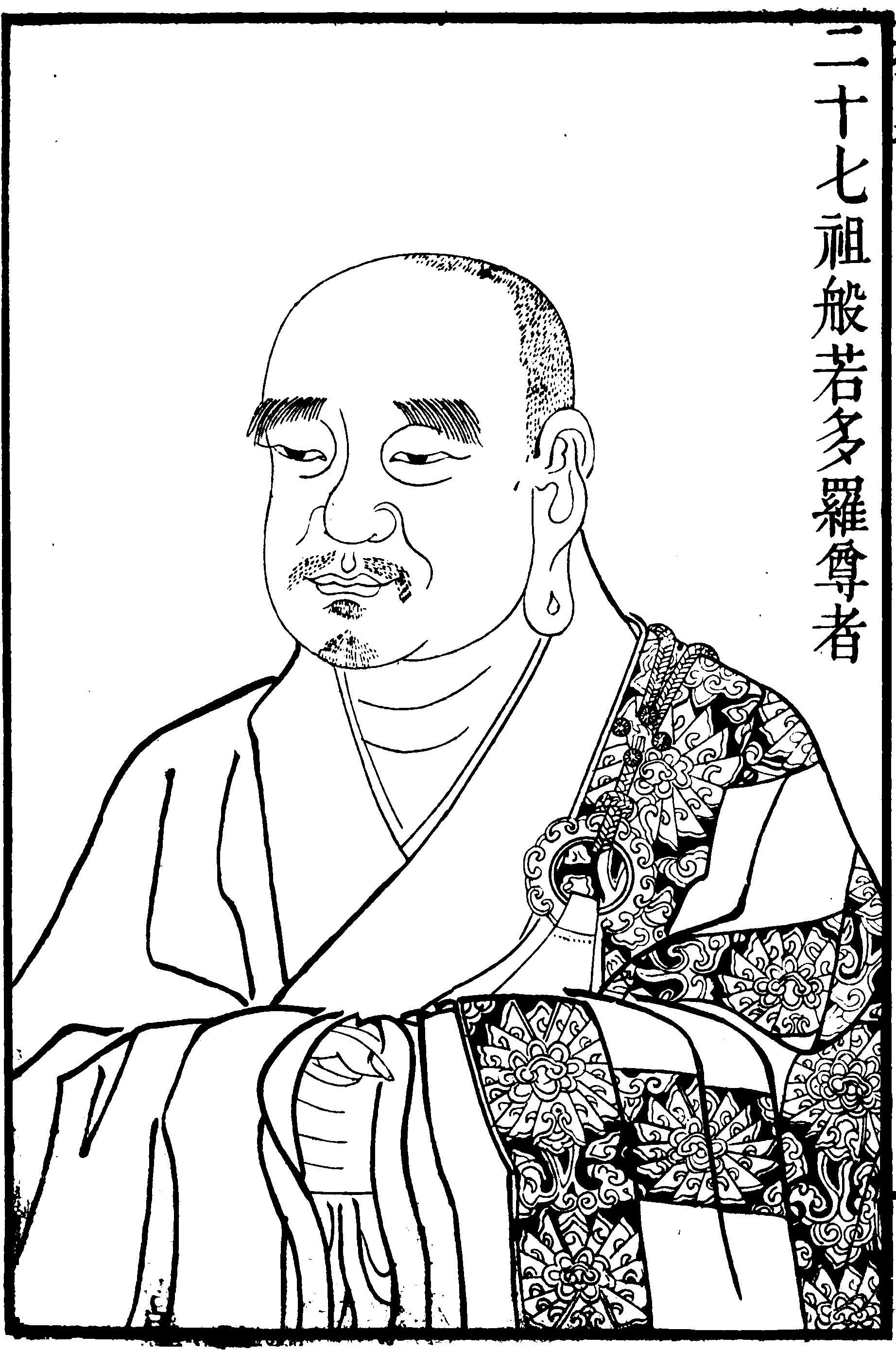
- Title: 27th Indian Chan Patriarch

Personal life
- Died: 457 CE

Religious life
- Religion: Buddhism
- School: Chan

Senior posting
- Predecessor: Punyamitra
- Successor: Bodhidharma

Prajñātārā, also known as Keyura, Prajnadhara, or Hannyatara, was the twenty-seventh patriarch of Indian Buddhism according to Chan Buddhism, and the teacher of Bodhidharma.

== Life According to The Transmission of the Lamp ==
Little independent information about the life of Prajñātārā exists outside of The Jingde Record of the Transmission of the Lamp, a hagiographic account of the lives of early Indian and Chinese masters in the Chan tradition.

Prajñātārā was from a Brahmin family in eastern India and was orphaned at a young age. Without a family name, Prajñātārā was called 'Precious Necklace' or 'Keyura' before ordination. When the 26th Patriarch, Punyamitra, came to visit the king of Prajñātārā's region, Punyamitra stopped the king's carriage on seeing Prajñātārā bowing. Prajñātārā was identified as having been Punyamitra's student in a previous incarnation, and Punyamitra identified Prajñātārā as an incarnation of the Bodhisattva Mahasthamaprapta. Punyamitra confirmed Prajñātārā as his Dharma-successor and then died.

After receiving the Dharma, Prajñātārā traveled to southern India and encountered Bodhidharma, then living as the youngest son of a king called Excelling in Fragrance. Before dying at the age of sixty-seven, Prajñātārā instructed Bodhidharma to travel to China to spread the Dharma. At death, Prajñātārā ascended into the sky and burst into flame, raining down relics on devotees below.

The Denkoroku by Keizan Jokin Zenji relates the following kōan, a legendary exchange between Prajñātārā and Bodhidharma.

The Venerable Prajnatara asks Bodhidharma, "What is it that is formless amongst things?"
Bodhidharma says, "Formlessness is unborn."
Prajnatara asks, "What is the highest amongst things?"
Bodhidharma says, "The Actual Nature is the highest."

The Transmission of the Lamp records several prophecies attributed to Prajñātārā by later Chinese patriarchs. Among them were the prediction of a great calamity during the time of Bodhidharma's heirs Huike and Sengcan that supposedly motivated them to take refuge in the mountains in order to avoid persecutions of Buddhism carried out by the emperor between 574–77. Prajñātārā supposedly also predicted the emergence of Mazu Daoyi and the spread of Chan Buddhism throughout China.

== Gender ==
While Prajñātārā has generally been assumed to be male and is listed among the Chan Patriarchs (all of whom are male), 20th century Buddhist practitioners have suggested that Prajñātārā might have been a woman. The ordination name Prajñātārā combines the names of two female Buddhist deities or Bodhisattva, Prajnaparamita and Tara.

In 2008, Rev. Koten Benson suggested that Prajñātārā might have been a woman and was the head of the Sarvastivadin order. He claims that oral traditions in Kerala and the Korean Seon (Korean Zen Buddhism) tradition identify Prajñātārā as female, and that archaeological evidence from southern India confirms the existence of famous female teachers.

Reactions to this theory by mainstream Buddhist scholars have ranged from outright dismissal to an acknowledgement that it could be possible. Classical Chinese texts do not always denote gender, and in the absence of explicit gender designations an entry in the list of Dharma successors might be presumed to be male. While less information regarding female teachers has generally been retained by the tradition, the equality of women in spiritual matters was affirmed by the Buddha, and the Chan tradition has a history of female teachers.

The Shōbōgenzo, a 12th century Japanese text written by Zen Master Dōgen, which structurally preserves record of the zen lineage, references Hannyatara as female in chapter 50.

Archeological discoveries have confirmed the existence of a female teacher in southern India. The historical and oral traditions of the people of the state of Kerala provide details about the lives of both Prajñatara and Bodhidharma. The information transmitted through the Zen lineages of Korea confirm this written and oral history, while the knowledge that Bodhidharma had a woman master seems to have been lost in China after a few generations. Some scholars assert that this is because in written Chinese, gender is inferred from context rather than stated explicitly.

Buddhist titles
Preceded by Punyamitra	Lineage of Zen Buddhist Patriarchs	Succeeded by Bodhidharma
