= Punyamitra =

26th Indian Patriarch of Chan Buddhism

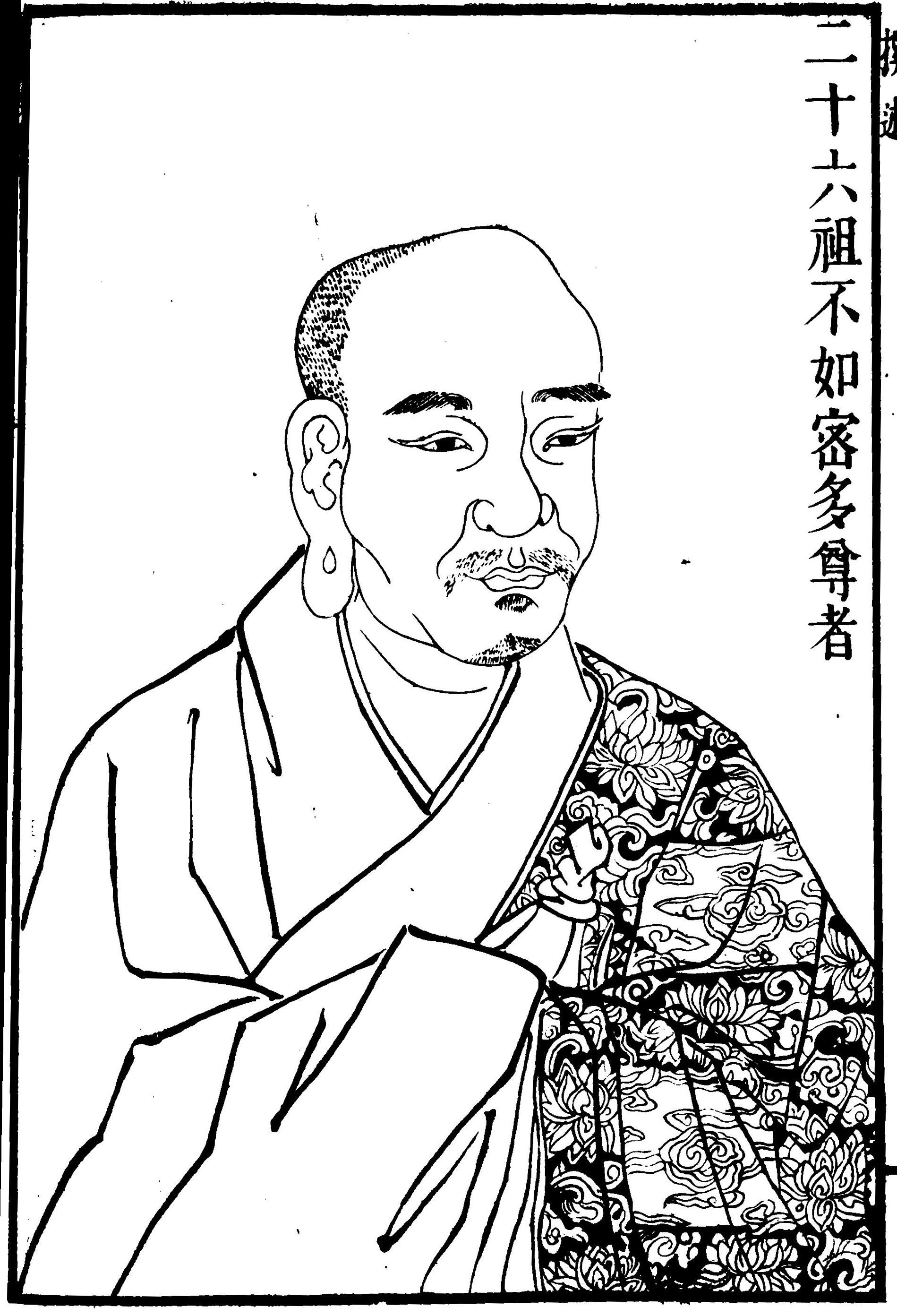
- Title: 26th Indian Chan Patriarch

Personal life
- Died: 388 CE

Religious life
- Religion: Buddhism
- School: Chan

Senior posting
- Predecessor: Bashyashita
- Successor: Prajñātārā

Punyamitra was the 26th Indian Patriarch of Chan Buddhism. A legendary figure, little information about him exists outside of Buddhist hagiographic texts. He is estimated to have died late in the 4th Century CE.

== Biography According to the Transmission of the Lamp ==
According to The Jingde Record of the Transmission of the Lamp, Punyamitra was the eldest son of a king of southern India known as Virtuous Conqueror. Punyamitra's father favored the teaching of certain heretical Brahmin sects, and had Punyamitra imprisoned for reproaching the king for favoring these Brahmins. After the robe of Bahsyashita, the 25th Patriarch, was miraculously unburned despite being thrown into a fire, the king relented and ordered Punyamitra's release. Upon his release, Punyamitra sought ordination from Bashyashita and served as his attendant for six years in the royal palace. Bashyashita was already extremely old, and soon designated Punyamitra as his heir before his death.

After Bashyashita's death, Punyamitra traveled to eastern India, where a group of Brahmins who practiced black magic attempted to oppose him. Punyamitra defeated them by banishing an illusion of a magical mountain and became advisor to the king who had previously patronized the Brahmins. Punyamitra declared that a sage lived in the king's country who would succeed him, and later encountered the orphan Prajnatara in the streets.

Buddhist titles
Preceded by Bashyashita	Lineage of Zen Buddhist Patriarchs	Succeeded by Prajnatara
