= Shiwu =

Chinese Chan poet and hermit

Shiwu (石屋, Wade–Giles: Shih^{2}-Wu^{1}, Pinyin: Shíwū) or Stonehouse (1272–1352) was a Chinese Chan poet and recluse who lived during the Yuan Dynasty. Shiwu was born in the town of Changshu, taking his name from the Shihwutung (Stonehouse cave) in Yushan. In 1292 Shiwu became a novice at Yushan's Hsingfu temple, a major monastic center at the time. He studied under master Yung-Wei and three years later was ordained and received the dharma name Ch'ing-hung.

== Biography ==
He is said to have followed a monk to the Tianmu Mountains to meet with Chan master Kao-Feng. On his arrival Kao-feng asked why he came to his hermitage, to which Shiwu answered, "I've come for the Dharma".

Kao-feng said, "The Dharma isn't so easy to find. You've got to burn your fingers for incense".

Shiwu replied, "But I see the Master before me with my own eyes. How could the Dharma be hidden?".

Kao-feng took him as his pupil and gave him the koan "All things return to one" for study.

=== Chi-an ===
After three years with little progress, Shiwu decided to leave and Kao-feng recommended he study under the Chan master Chi-an. Shiwu crossed the Yangtze and met Chi-an at West Peak Temple near Chienyang.

Chi-an asked Shiwu what teaching he had received.

Shiwu said, "All things return to one".

Chi-an asked what it meant and Shiwu remained silent.

Chi-an said "Those words are dead. Where did you pick up such rot?".

Shiwu bowed and asked for instruction.

Chi-an then gave him another koan: "Where buddhas dwell, don't stop. Where buddhas don't dwell, hurry past".

Shiwu said he didn't understand but decided to stay with Chi-an.

One day, Chi-an asked once more about the koan and Shiwu answered, "When you mount the horse, you see the road".

Chi-an admonished him once again.

Shiwu left but on his way down the mountain he saw a pavilion and had a sudden insight. He turned back and told Chi-an, "Where buddhas dwell, don't stop. Those are dead words. Where buddhas don't dwell, hurry past. Those are dead words too. Now I understand living words".

Chi-an asked him what he understood and Shiwu answered, "When the rain finally stops in late spring, the oriole appears on a branch"

Chi-an later served as abbot of the Taochang temple and Shiwu joined him. Shiwu also served as a meditation teacher in Lingyin temple.

=== Poet ===
In 1312 at the age of forty he moved to Xiamu Mountain near Huzhou to live as a hermit and it is here that he composed his "Mountain Poems" (Shan-shih), one-hundred and eighty-four verses mostly dealing with life in the mountains. In the preface to the Mountain poems, Shiwu writes:

Here in the woods I have lots of free time. When I don't spend it sleeping, I enjoy composing gathas. But with paper and ink so scarce, I haven't thought of writing them down. Now some Zen monks have asked me to record what I find of interest on this mountain. I've sat here quietly and let my brush fly. Suddenly, this volume is full. I close it and sent it back down with the admonition not to try singing these poems. Only if you sit on them will they do you any good.

The opening poem of the Shan-Shi describes the natural setting of his hermitage:

I made my home west of the Sha
where water fills Sky Lake and the moon fills the river
people are frightened when they see the heights
but once they arrive they know the trail
dried snail shells on rock walls
fresh tiger tracks in the mud
my door stays open when spring days grow long
when paulownias bloom and cicadas call

Many of his poems deal with the mundane facets of everyday hermit life.

I don't stop moving all day
long before sunset I'm done
back home I wash off my feet and sleep
too tired to notice the mountain moon's passage
birds wake me up from a distant grove
the red sun's disc shines through the pines
today and tomorrow don't differ
the years are all the same.

Some of the poems also focus on Zen Buddhist philosophical ideals like impermanence and non-attachment.

This body's existence is like a bubble's
may as well accept what happens
events and hopes seldom agree
but who can step back doesn't worry
we blossom and fade like flowers
gather and part like clouds
worldly thoughts I forgot long ago
relaxing all day on a peak.

== Reception ==
American translator Red Pine traveled to the Zhongnan Mountains and translated Shiwu's poems into English.

== See also ==
- Chinese poetry
- Classical Chinese poetry
- Hanshan (poet)
