= Clay City, Kentucky =

- City
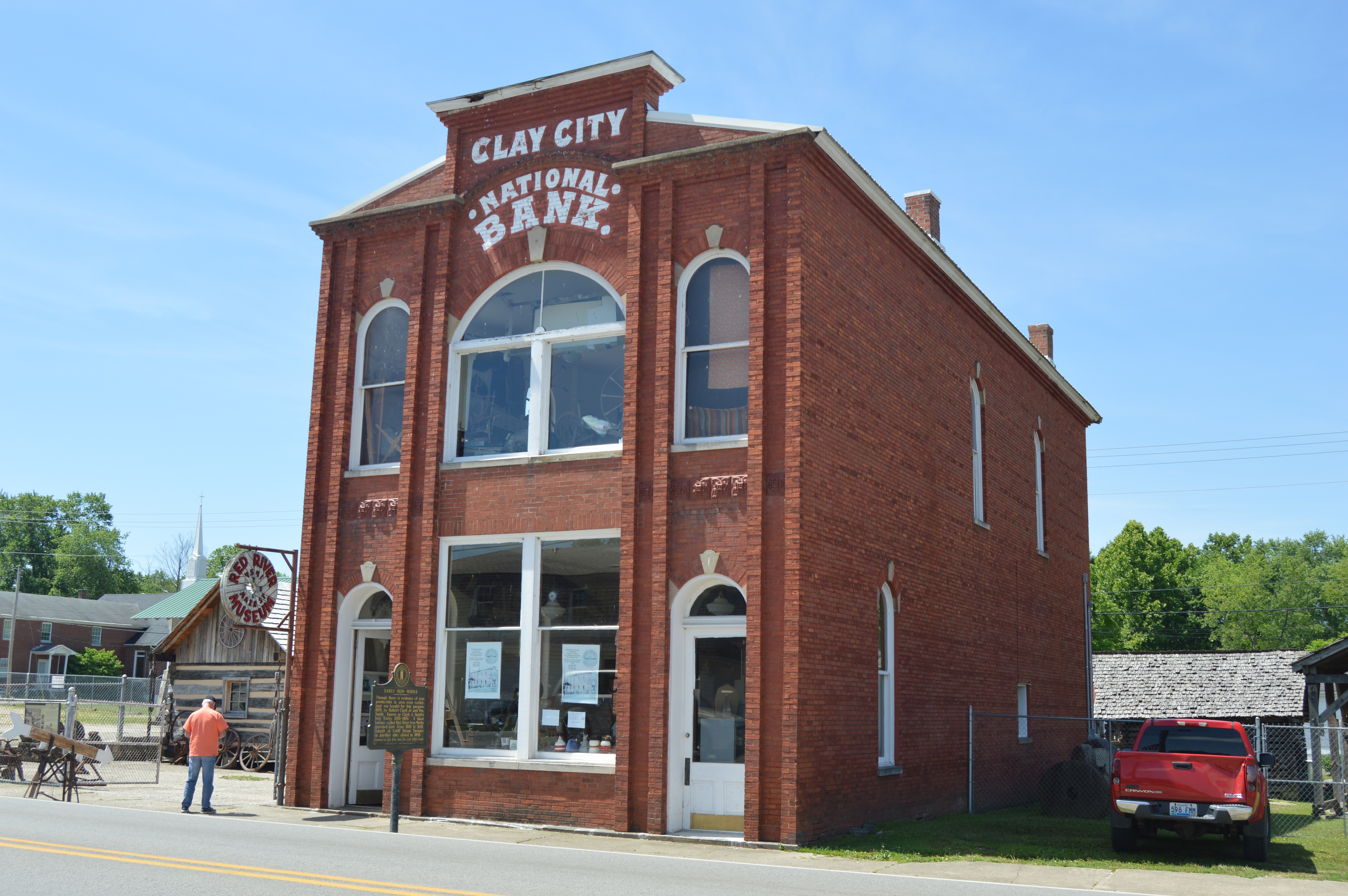
- The historic Clay City National Bank Building

- Location of Clay City in Powell County, Kentucky.
- Coordinates: 37°51′48″N 83°55′42″W
- Country: United States
- State: Kentucky
- County: Powell
- Incorporated: April 19, 1890

Government
  - Type: Mayor-Council
  - Mayor: Robert Carmichael

Area
  - Total: 1.12 sq mi (2.90 km^{2})
  - Land: 1.06 sq mi (2.74 km^{2})
  - Water: 0.058 sq mi (0.15 km^{2})
- Elevation: 620 ft (190 m)

Population (2020)
  - Total: 1,193
  - Density: 1,126.3/sq mi (434.88/km^{2})
- Time zone: UTC-5 (Eastern (EST))
  - Summer (DST): UTC-4 (EDT)
- ZIP code: 40312
- Area code: 606
- FIPS code: 21-15238
- GNIS feature ID: 0511380
- Website: claycity.ky.gov

Clay City is a home rule-class city in Powell County, Kentucky, United States. The population was 1,193 at the 2020 census.

== History ==
The first European settlement in the vicinity of present-day Clay City was in 1786, by Stephen Collins and his brother, after their discovery of pyrite deposits. Shortly afterwards, the brothers set up the first iron forge west of the Allegheny Mountains and established Collins Forge. The Collins brother sold their forge to Clark and Smith in 1805, the forerunner company of the Red River Iron Works. For much of the 19th century, the settlement was known by the same name as the forge. By the 1880s, the post office was moved across the river and was renamed Waltersville for the local family carrying the same surname.

By 1883 the settlement was named Clay City, possibly for the local clay deposits. It is believed that the name was officially changed from Waltersville on August 13, 1883, when the post office was renamed Clay City. The settlement was incorporated as a fifth-class city on April 19, 1890.

== Geography ==
Clay City is located at 37°51′48″N 83°55′42″W (37.863203, -83.928281).

According to the United States Census Bureau, the city has a total area of 1.1 square miles (2.8 km^{2}), all land.

The city is located in a low-lying area in the Red River Valley. With such proximity to the Red River, it floods quite frequently when a large storm/thunderstorm moves through the area.

== Demographics ==
Historical population
Census	Pop.	Note	%±
1890	1,065		—
1900	585		−45.1%
1910	581		−0.7%
1920	602		3.6%
1930	528		−12.3%
1940	627		18.8%
1950	636		1.4%
1960	764		20.1%
1970	983		28.7%
1980	1,276		29.8%
1990	1,258		−1.4%
2000	1,303		3.6%
2010	1,077		−17.3%
2020	1,193		10.8%
U.S. Decennial Census

As of the census of 2000, there were 1,303 people, 543 households, and 367 families residing in the city. The population density was 1,199.5 inhabitants per square mile (463.1/km^{2}). There were 588 housing units at an average density of 541.3 per square mile (209.0/km^{2}). The racial makeup of the city was 99.08% White, 0.23% African American, 0.15% Native American, and 0.54% from two or more races. Hispanic or Latino of any race were 0.84% of the population.

There were 543 households, out of which 33.0% had children under the age of 18 living with them, 42.5% were married couples living together, 18.6% had a female householder with no husband present, and 32.4% were non-families. 29.5% of all households were made up of individuals, and 10.3% had someone living alone who was 65 years of age or older. The average household size was 2.40 and the average family size was 2.95.

In the city, the population was spread out, with 27.1% under the age of 18, 8.7% from 18 to 24, 29.3% from 25 to 44, 23.6% from 45 to 64, and 11.4% who were 65 years of age or older. The median age was 34 years. For every 100 females, there were 99.5 males. For every 100 females age 18 and over, there were 91.5 males.

The median income for a household in the city was $18,750, and the median income for a family was $23,571. Males had a median income of $26,696 versus $16,964 for females. The per capita income for the city was $10,745. About 28.5% of families and 32.3% of the population were below the poverty line, including 42.4% of those under age 18 and 27.1% of those age 65 or over.

== Police department ==
The Clay City Police Department (CCPD) is located at the Clay City Municipal Building which also houses the city government. Being under the second class city rank, Clay City is patrolled by two full-time officers and assisted by the Powell County Sheriffs Office, Stanton Police Department, and the Kentucky State Police. CCPD is a fully functioning police department that manages narcotics, roadway patrol, warrant service, and other activities.

== Attractions ==
- Furnace Mountain - Korean Zen Buddhist temple.
- Meadows Public Golf Course
- Beechfork Public Golf Course
- Red River Museum
- Meadowgreen Music Hall
- Mountain Park Dragway

== Climate ==
The climate in this area is characterized by hot, humid summers and generally mild to cool winters. According to the Köppen Climate Classification system, Clay City has a humid subtropical climate, abbreviated "Cfa" on climate maps.
