= DAT =

DAT or Dat may refer to:

== Science ==
- Diamyltryptamine, a tryptamine derivative
- Direct agglutination test, any test that uses whole organisms as a means of looking for serum antibody
- Direct antiglobulin test, one of two Coombs tests
- Dopamine transporter or dopamine active transporter, a membrane-spanning protein
- DaT Scan, a diagnostic test for Parkinson's disease and related conditions

== Education ==
- Dental Admission Test, taken by dental school candidates the US and Canada
- Design and Technology, school subject in primary and secondary school

== Technology ==
- .dat, computer filename extension, typically for a file considered to contain data
- dat (software), a decentralized data tool for distributing data small and large.
- DAT Solutions, or Dial-A-Truck, provider of electronic transportation information
- Digital Audio Tape, an audio recording and playback medium
- Double acting tanker, a type of icebreaking tanker ship
- Dynamic Acceleration Technology, increases single-threaded performance on multi-core processors
- Dynamic Address Translation, IBM's term for virtual memory mapping: Virtual memory#History

== Transport ==
- DAT (airline), an airline based in Vamdrup, Denmark
- Datong Yungang International Airport, an airport with the IATA code of DAT in Shanxi Province, China
- DAT, the ICAO code for Canadian airline Lynx Air
- DAT, the National Rail code for Datchet railway station in the county of Berkshire, UK
- Delta Air Transport, former Belgian airline
- Delivered at Terminal, a former Incoterms term whereby the seller pays all transport costs

== Media and entertainment ==
- Day After Tomorrow (band), a 3-member J-pop band under the Avex label
- Dat (song), a song written and recorded by Pluto Shervington
- DAT (newspaper), a Kazakh news source

== Other ==
- Abbreviation for grammatical dative case
- Desk appearance ticket, a New York order to appear in criminal court
- Disaster Action Team, the local disaster response unit of the American Red Cross
- Drug action teams, involved in applying UK drugs policy
- Dolphin-assisted therapy, swimming with dolphins as a therapy
- DAT (chemotherapy) is a regimen that consists of Daunorubicin, Ara-C (cytarabine) and Thioguanine
- Divergent Association Test (DAT) is a psychological creativity test
- DAT (Ukrainian: Державне акціонерне товариство), a type of Ukrainian legal entity

== See also ==
- Dietmar Dath (born 1970), German author, journalist and translator
