= Wubong =

Polish Zen master

Zen Master Wu Bong 우봉
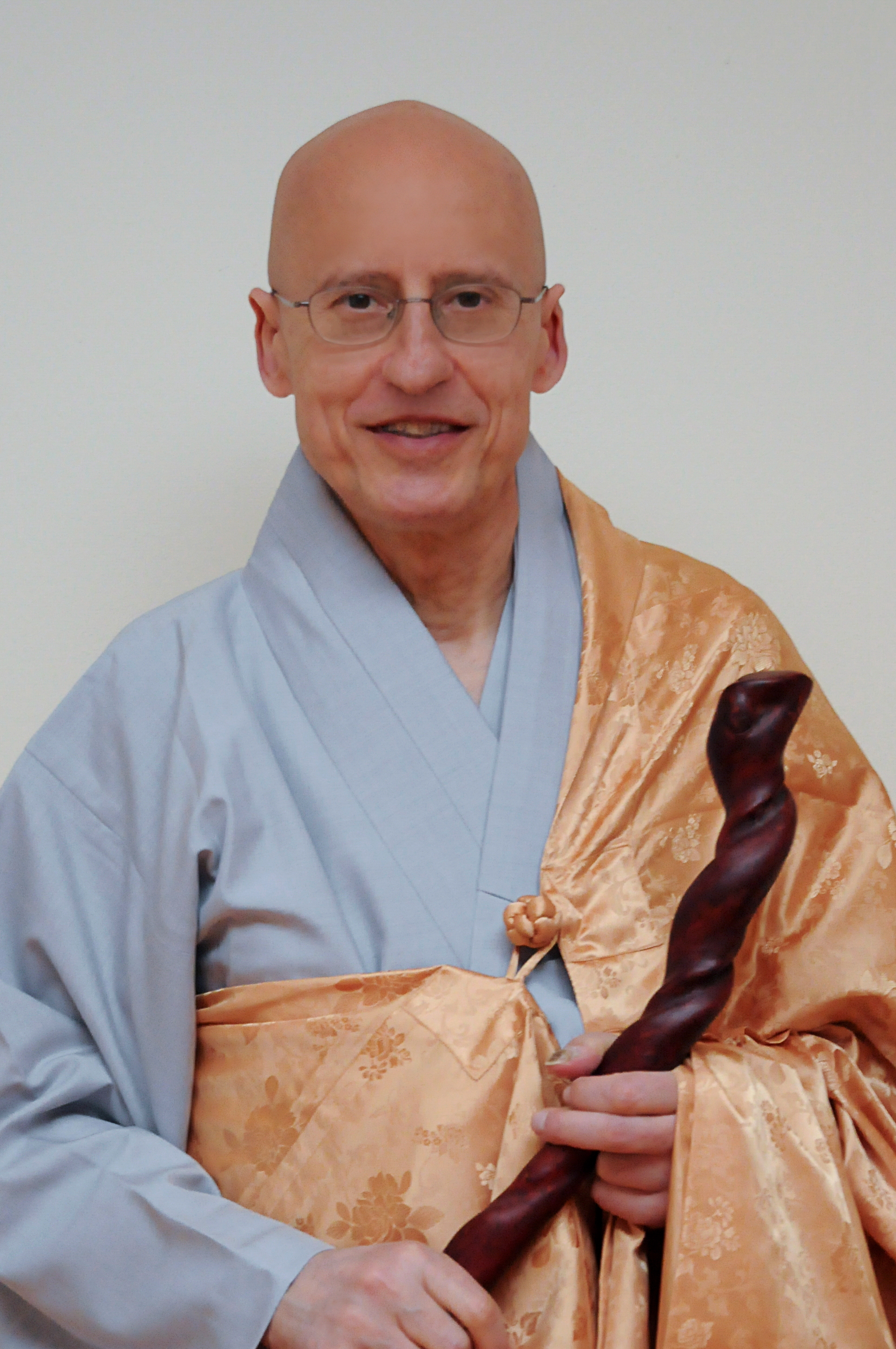
- Title: Soen Sa Nim (Korean), Zen Master

Personal life
- Born: Jacob Perl; June 22, 1950 Wroclaw, Poland
- Died: April 17, 2013 Paris, France
- Cause of death: cardiac arrest
- Spouse: Grazyna Perl
- Education: Brown University: Mathematician

Religious life
- Religion: Zen Buddhist
- School: Kwan Um School of Zen

Senior posting
- Based in: Paris Zen Center, Zen Center Berlin and Boep Hwa Do Ryang in Korea
- Predecessor: Zen Master Seung Sahn
- Website: zen.kwanumeurope.org/

Zen Master Wu Bong Sunim, born Jacob Perl, was a Zen master and monk in the Kwan Um School of Zen. Wu Bong Sunim was the head teacher of the European Kwan Um School of Zen until his death in April 2013.

== Early years ==
Zen Master Wu Bong was born in Wroclaw, Poland, on June 22, 1950, In 1964, the family decided to leave Europe and emigrated to the United States. Jacob Perl, as he was known by his birth name, continued to go to school and graduated from high school in 1968. In 1970, at the age of 20, he began practicing Zen with the famous Sōtō Zen teacher Shunryū Suzuki Roshi at the San Francisco Zen Center. The questions of life and death became very urgent for him. Continuing his search for a teacher, he went to Tarthang Tulku for a year to practice Tibetan Buddhism.

== Meeting his teacher, Zen Master Seung Sahn ==
While a student at Brown University in Providence, he trained in Shim Gum Do (similar to Kendo) and became a master in this martial art. In 1972, while still a student at Brown, he met Zen Master Seung Sahn and became one of his first students. He completed his first 100-day solo retreat that same year at the age of 22. He also took five precepts and received his Buddhist name, Peop Mu, which means the Empty Dharma.

In 1973 he graduated in mathematics from Brown University with a Bachelor of Pure Arts. In 1978, together with Zen Master Seung Sahn, he returned for the first time to Europe, to Poland, his native country, where from that time on a sangha developed and grew, eventually becoming the largest sangha in the European Kwan Um School of Zen.

In 1978 he made his second solo retreat in America. At that time, his health suffered because of a very strict diet and strong practice.

== Teaching years ==
In 1984 he received Inka from Zen Master Seung Sahn and, although still living in the USA, became the official supporter of the Polish sangha. From then on, he traveled frequently to Poland. In 1988 he married Grazyna, and their son Matthew was born in 1989. In 1992 he was officially appointed European Head Teacher by the founding teacher of the Kwan Um School of Zen, Zen Master Seung Sahn. In 1993 he received transmission from Zen Master Seung Sahn and was given the Dharma name Wu Bong, which means Universal Peak. At that time he lived at Providence Zen Center, where he was abbot for many years. Shortly thereafter, he moved to Paris with his family and founded the Paris Zen Center. Between his Inka and transmission he was very active, teaching in Europe, Asia, South Africa, and America.

== His dharma heirs ==
In 2000 he gave his first Inka, to Dr. Roland Wöhrle-Chon from Germany (now Zen Master Ji Kwang). In 2006 he gave his first transmission to Alexandra Porter (Zen Master Bon Shim) from Poland. In 2012, he gave his second transmission to Ji Kwang. In total, he has given two transmissions and eight Inkas: Andrzej Piotrowski (Poland), Namhee Chon (Germany), Alma Potter (Austria), Bogumila Malinowska (England), Oleg Suk (Slovakia), Arne Schaefer (Germany), Koen Vermeulen (Belgium).

== Monkhood and later years ==
In 2008, he moved to Korea to prepare to become a monk. In order to keep a place in Europe, he moved to the Berlin Zen Center, which became his home in Europe. In 2009, he was ordained a Buddhist monk in Korea. He continued to lead and teach his European sangha until the end of his life, while also concentrating on teaching in Korea. He led Kyol Che (100-day Zen retreats) at Mu Sang Sa, Hyang Chung Sa, Hwa Gye Sa, and Boep-hwa Doryang (all in Korea). Wu Bong Sunim left his body after a cardiac arrest on Wednesday, April 17, 2013 at 1 p.m. while leading a Yong Maeng Jong Jin (Zen retreat) at the Paris Zen Center.

== Teaching ==
=== Don't know mind ===
"Keeping a 'don't know' mind means cutting off all thinking. According to his teachings, cutting off all discursive thoughts takes to the wellspring of our true nature, and brings us to the present moment. "What are you doing just now? Paying attention to this very moment is what Zen practice is all about." - Zen Master Wu Bong

=== Perseverance and direction of Zen practice ===
Zen Master Wu Bong's teaching style was simple, but at the same time very sharp. He pointed out the importance of Zen practice to give one attainment of truth and a clear direction.

One of Zen Master Wu Bong’s often heard teachings is on decision making. He used to advise throwing up a coin in the air. He would go on saying that by the time it fell, we would usually know which outcome we wish for. After this, according to the technique he would jokingly call ‘a secret technique’, even looking at the outcome (head or tails) would be unnecessary. “From a vantage point of distance, most decisions are not so important, either way is OK. Why we do what we do is most important. ‘Is it for me or is it for others?’ If our direction is clear, then our choice is also clear.”

Zen practitioners do not necessarily have a shared set of beliefs. Instead, Zen practitioners put trust and belief in the present, in their practice, whatever it consists of.

Zen Master Wu Bong believed that Zen practitioners need keep on with Zen practice and its given forms, be they bowing, chanting, silent sitting, mantra, kongan, or counting the breath. He believed it was import to not constantly change, as he thought Zen is not about checking and preferences. Zen Master Wu Bong emphasized approaching and reflecting each situation without hindrance, known as 'trying mind', which is often invoked with the admonition: 'just do it!' Which means to practice and to save all beings. He believed Zen practitioners have to decide and commit to this course, and then repeatedly try until they completely attain it.

=== Waking up ===
Zen Master Wu Bong put emphasis on "waking up" and it's urgency. "Nobody guarantees our life. So if there is anything that you think may be useful, just now is the time to use it. In our life, past mind and future mind cannot be attained. Present mind also cannot be attained. Because if you say "present", it is already not present, already gone. If you lose this moment, you can never regain it. We follow Buddha's example. Buddha means awakened. If you are not going to awake, tomorrow is too late. One hour from now is also too late. Even one second from now is too late. Just this moment, wake up. I hope each of you will make correct practice in your life and attain wake-up. Then one more step is important: use this wake-up to help all beings." - Zen Master Wu Bong

== Video ==
- Don't Know - A tribute to Zen Master Wu Bong, by Fabio Dondero and Chiara Somajni, 2016 (Video on demand, Documentary webpage)

== See also ==
- Buddhism in Europe
- Buddhism in the United States
- Timeline of Zen Buddhism in the United States
