= DAE =

DAE or Dae may refer to:

== As an acronym ==
- DAE (chemotherapy), a chemotherapy regimen consisting of Daunorubicin, Ara-C (cytarabine) and Etoposide
- Daxing Airport Express, the airport transit service to Beijing Daxing International Airport in Beijing, China
- Department of Atomic Energy, an Indian government department responsible for administration of India's nuclear programme
- Design Academy Eindhoven, a design school in Eindhoven, the Netherlands
- Destacamento de Acções Especiais, Special Actions Detachment, a Portuguese naval commando unit
- Dictionary of American English, a 1938 dictionary of terms appearing in English in the United States (20th century)
- Differential-algebraic equation, a general form of differential equation, given in implicit form
- Digidesign Audio Engine, an American digital audio technology company
- Digital Asset Exchange (.dae), the filename extension used by COLLADA
- Digital audio editor, a computer application for audio editing
- Digital audio extraction (ripping), the process of copying the audio data from one media form to a hard disk
- Diploma of Associate Engineering, a 3-year engineering diploma in Pakistan offered after 10th grade
- Dubai Aerospace Enterprise, a global aerospace, manufacturing and services corporation
- Dutch Antilles Express, an airline company in the Antilles

== People ==
- Dae (surname), a list of people with the rare Korean surname
- Dae Dae (born 1992), American rapper from Atlanta, Georgia, U.S.
- Dae Gak (born 1947), Zen master and guiding teacher of Furnace Mountain, Clay City, Kentucky, U.S.
- Dae Imlani (born 1954), Filipino swimmer
- Dae Kwang (born 1944), guiding teacher of the Providence Zen Center, Cumberland, Rhode Island, U.S.
- Dae Sung Lee (born 1958), Korean-American master of taekwondo
- various kings of Balhae (698–926), in Korea

== Other uses ==
- Dae (film), a 1979 Yugoslavian short documentary film
