= Dae Kwang =

American Buddhist teacher

Dae Kwang 대광
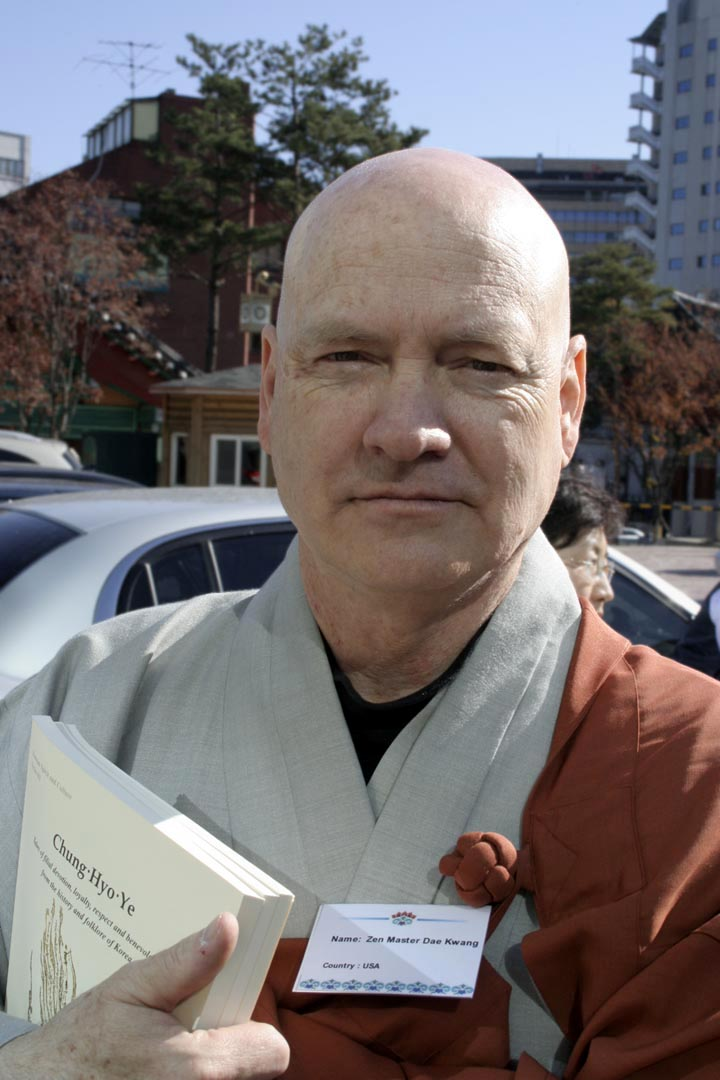
- Dae Kwang in 2007
- Title: Soen Sa Nim

Personal life
- Born: March 3, 1944 (age 82)

Religious life
- Religion: Zen
- School: Kwan Um School of Zen
- Dharma name: Great Light

Senior posting
- Based in: Providence Zen Center
- Predecessor: Dae Soen Sa Nim

Dae Kwang is a Soen Sa Nim and is the current guiding teacher of the Providence Zen Center. He was ordained as a monk in 1987 and received Dharma transmission from Seung Sahn in 1996. He also serves as head abbot of the entire lineage, ranking just below Soeng Hyang (who is guiding teacher).

== See also ==
- Timeline of Zen Buddhism in the United States
