= Chogye International Zen Center =

Kwan Um School of Zen practice center in New York City

Coordinates: 40.73109°N 73.98249°W

Chogye International Zen Center is a Kwan Um School of Zen practice center founded by Seung Sahn in 1975, located in New York City. The center offers a daily practice regimen, as well as retreats and workshops. Wu Kwang is the guiding teacher and resident Zen Master.

== See also ==
- Cambridge Zen Center
- List of Zen centers in the United States
- Musangsa
- Providence Zen Center
- Tel Aviv Zen Center
- Timeline of Zen Buddhism in the United States
