= Association test =

Association test may refer to:

- Association Test, a "test" in Colonial American as to if a citizen would support the Continental Association
- Controlled Oral Word Association Test (COWAT), a verbal fluency test
- Implicit-association test, an assessment intended to detect subconscious associations

== See also ==
- Divergent Association Task (DAT), a psychological test designed to measure a person's creativity
