= Bon Yeon =

American zen master

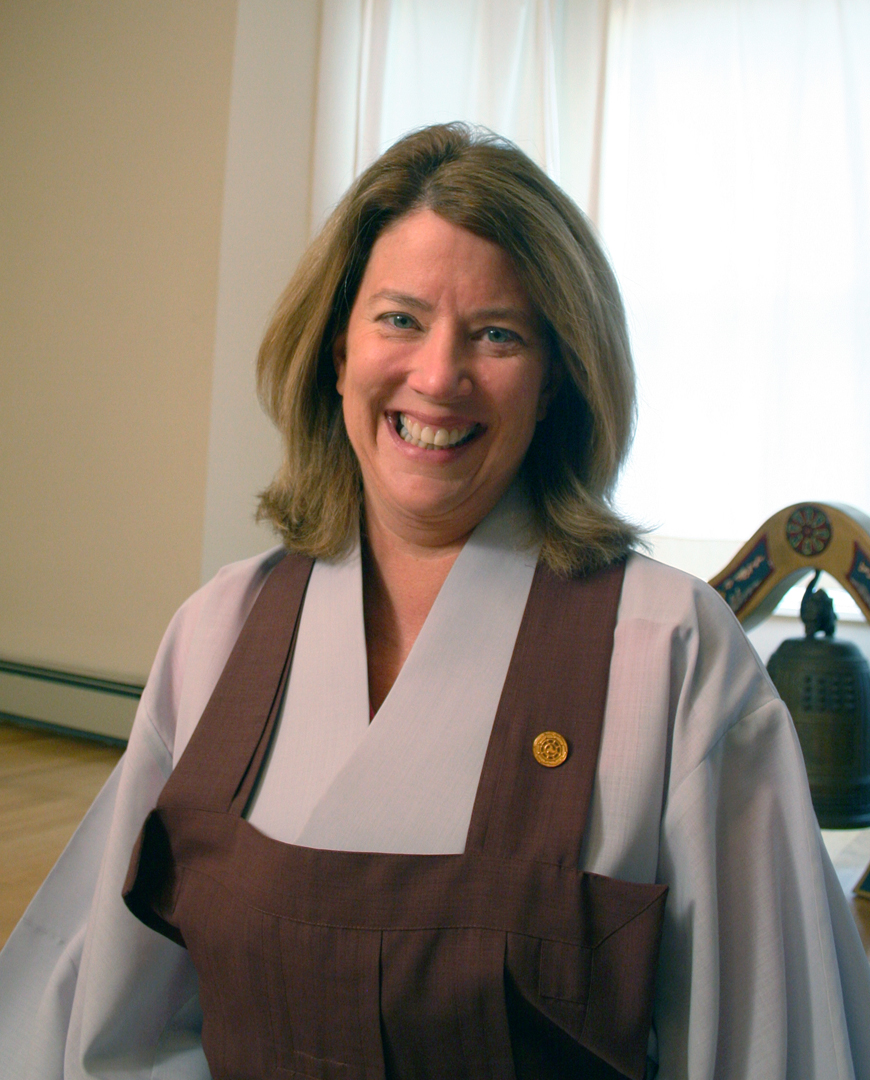
- Bon Yeon in 2005
- Title: Soen Sa Nim (Zen master)

Personal life
- Born: Jane McLaughlin United States
- Education: University of Vermont

Religious life
- Religion: Buddhism
- School: Kwan Um School of Zen
- Lineage: Jogye Order of Korean Seon
- Dharma names: Bon Yeon

Senior posting
- Teacher: Seungsahn
- Based in: Cambridge Zen Center

Soensanim Bon Yeon is the dharma name and title of Jane McLaughlin-Dobisz. She is the guiding teacher of the Cambridge Zen Center of the Kwan Um School of Zen in Cambridge, Massachusetts. She received dharma transmission in 2000, and is also a published author and editor of the book The Whole World is a Single Flower by Seungsahn.

== Bibliography ==
- The Wisdom of Solitude: A Zen Retreat in the Woods (2004, HarperCollins)
- One Hundred Days of Solitude: Losing Myself and Finding Grace on a Zen Retreat (2007, Wisdom Publications)
- The Whole World Is a Single Flower: 365 Kong-Ans for Everyday Life by Seung Sahn (editor, 1992, Tuttle Publishing)

== See also ==
- Buddhism in the United States
- Timeline of Zen Buddhism in the United States
