= Wu Kwang =

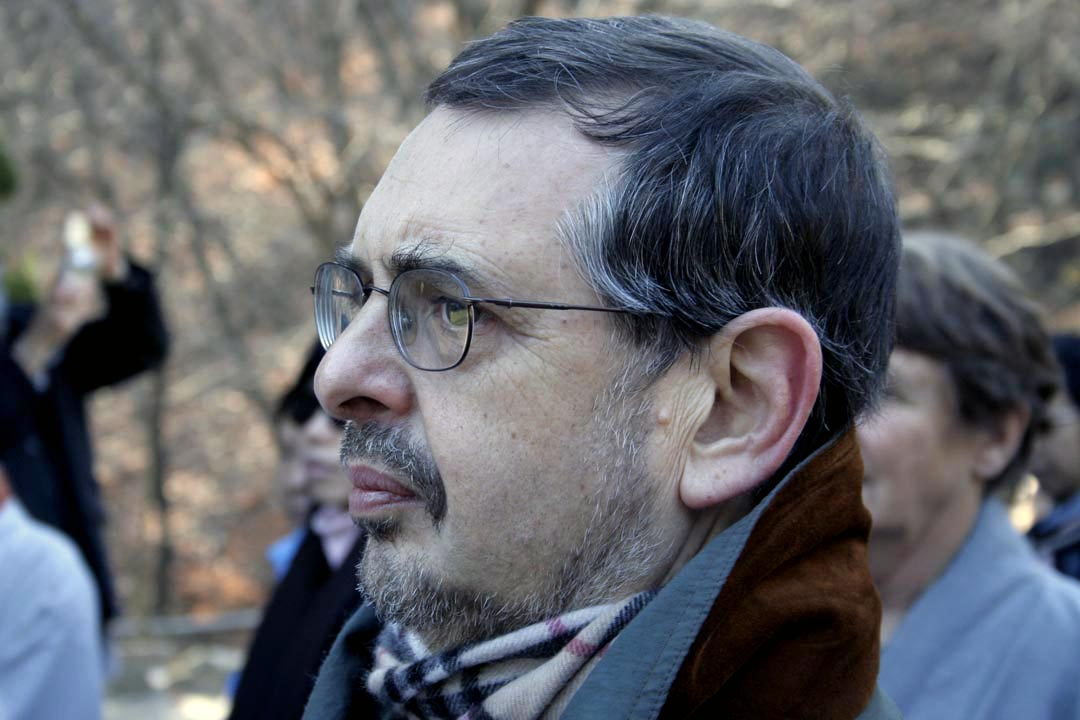
- At the Zen Master Seung Sahn Memorial 2007
- Title: Soen sa Nim

Personal life
- Born: Richard Shrobe; 1942 (age 83–84) United States

Religious life
- Religion: Jogye Order of Korean Buddhism
- School: Kwan Um School of Zen
- Dharma names: Universal Light

Senior posting
- Predecessor: Seung Sahn

Wu Kwang Soen Sa Nim (1950–present), born Richard Shrobe, is head Zen teacher at Chogye International Zen Center of New York, a practice center of the Kwan Um School of Zen. Before coming to Zen practice Richard studied Hinduism under Swami Satchidananda. He is a social worker who incorporates Gestalt therapy in his counseling. In 1975 Wu Kwang began his Zen practice and received Dharma transmission from Seung Sahn in 1993. He is also a jazz musician.

== Bibliography ==
- Open Mouth Already a Mistake, Cumberland, RI : Primary Point Press, 1997. ISBN 0-942795-08-3
- Don't Know Mind: the Spirit of Korean Zen, Boston: Shambhala Publications, 2004. ISBN 1-59030-110-2
- Elegant Failure: A Guide to Zen Koans, Berkeley, CA: Rodmell Press, 2010. ISBN 1-930485-25-5

== See also ==
- Timeline of Zen Buddhism in the United States
