= 7+3 (chemotherapy) =

Acute myelogenous leukemia induction therapy regimen

"7+3" in the context of chemotherapy is an acronym for a chemotherapy regimen that is most often used today (as of 2014) as first-line induction therapy (to induce remission) in acute myelogenous leukemia, excluding the acute promyelocytic leukemia form, which is better treated with ATRA and/or arsenic trioxide and requires less chemotherapy (if requires it at all, which is not always the case).

The name "7+3" comes from the duration of chemotherapy course, which consists of 7 days of standard-dose cytarabine, and 3 days of an anthracycline antibiotic or an anthracenedione, most often daunorubicin (can be substituted for doxorubicin or idarubicin or mitoxantrone).

== Dosing regimen ==
=== Standard-dose cytarabine plus daunorubicin (DA or DAC chemotherapy) ===
Drug	Dose	Mode	Days
Cytarabine	100–200 mg/m^{2}	IV continuous infusion over 24 hours	Days 1–7
Daunorubicin	(45) 60–90 mg/m^{2}	IV bolus	Days 1–3

=== Standard-dose cytarabine plus idarubicin (IA or IAC chemotherapy) ===
Drug	Dose	Mode	Days
Cytarabine	100–200 mg/m^{2}	IV continuous infusion over 24 hours	Days 1–7
Idarubicin	12 mg/m^{2}	IV bolus	Days 1–3

=== Standard-dose cytarabine plus mitoxantrone (MA or MAC chemotherapy) ===
Drug	Dose	Mode	Days
Cytarabine	100–200 mg/m^{2}	IV continuous infusion over 24 hours	Days 1–7
Mitoxantrone	7 mg/m^{2}	IV infusion	Days 1, 3 and 5

=== Intensified versions ===
There were attempts to intensify the "7+3" regimen in order to try to improve its efficiency. Attempts were made to prolong the course (cytarabine for 10 days instead of 7, or daunorubicin/idarubicin for 4–5 days instead of 3).

On the other hand, there were attempts to minimize the toxicity of the regimen by reducing the dose or the duration of the course, but these attempts compromised the efficacy of the regimen.

The addition of vinca alkaloids (vincristine or vinblastine) to the "7+3" regimen, which was quite popular in AML(ALL?) in old times (when the biology of AML and the differences between AML and ALL was poorly understood) proved to be harmful in AML, lowering the chance of the patient achieving remission. This is because vinca alkaloids are rapidly deactivated in myeloid cells by their enzyme myeloperoxidase. So the vinca alkaloids do much more damage to the lymphoid cell lines (including the T-cell lines responsible for antileukemic immunity) than to the myeloid cell lines. Moreover, vinca alkaloids in the context of AML cause AML cells to undergo a cell cycle arrest in the phase that renders those cells less sensitive to cytarabine and anthracyclines.

Addition of glucocorticoids (like prednisolone) or methotrexate or alkylating drugs (like cyclophosphamide or melphalan) to the "7+3" regimen is also of no benefit in AML.

The addition of etoposide to the standard "7+3" regimen is sometimes of benefit in poor-risk patients (many of whom are primary refractory to standard "7+3" induction regimens). It gave rise to the so-called ADE (or DAE = DA + etoposide) induction regimen in AML. The ADE induction (unlike, say, combinations of 7+3 with vinca alkaloids or prednisolone) is still sometimes used, especially in poor-risk AML patients.

The addition of 6-thioguanine gave rise to the DAT regimen, and the addition of 6-mercaptopurine gave rise to the DAM regimen.
