= Kwan Um School of Zen =

International school of Zen Buddhism

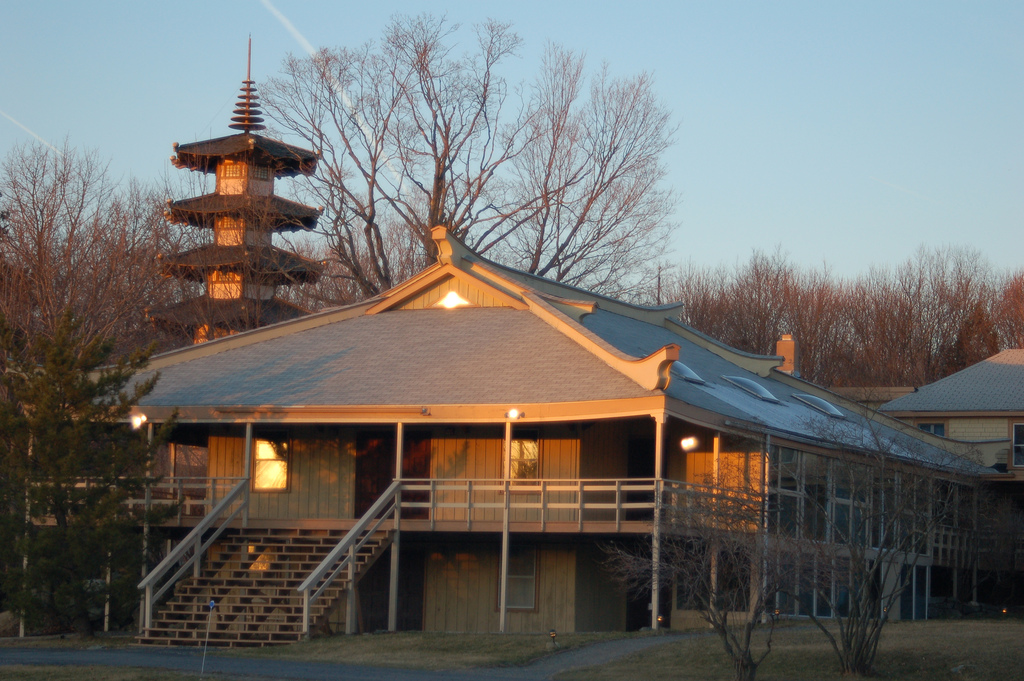
- Providence Zen Center, the school's international headquarters
- Established: 1983
- Founder: Seungsahn
- Headquarters: Providence Zen Center
- Guiding teacher: Soeng Hyang
- Head abbot: Dae Kwang
- Website: www.kwanumzen.org

The Kwan Um School of Zen (관음선종회,觀音禪宗會) (KUSZ) is an international school of zen centers and groups founded in 1983 by Zen Master Seung Sahn. The school's international head temple is located at the Providence Zen Center in Cumberland, Rhode Island, which was founded in 1972 shortly after Seung Sahn first came to the United States. The Kwan Um style of Buddhist practice combines ritual common both to Korean Buddhism as well as Rinzai school of Zen, and their morning and evening services include elements of Huayan and Pure Land Buddhism. While the Kwan Um Zen School comes under the banner of the Jogye Order of Korean Seon, the school has been adapted by Seung Sahn to the needs of Westerners. According to James Ishmael Ford, the Kwan Um School of Zen is the largest Zen school in the Western world.

== History ==
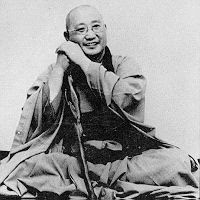
Seung Sahn (1927–2004)

Seung Sahn first arrived in the United States in 1972, where he lived in Providence, Rhode Island and worked at a Korean-owned laundromat, repairing washing machines to financially support himself. Not long after, students from nearby Brown University began coming to him for instruction. This resulted in the opening of the Providence Zen Center in 1972.

In 1974, prior to the official creation of the school, Seung Sahn founded Dharma Zen Center in Los Angeles, a place where laypeople could practice without leaving their urban lives, and regardless of their background. In that same year, Cambridge Zen Center was also started. The following year, Seung Sahn founded the Chogye International Zen Center of New York City, and then in 1977 Empty Gate Zen Center in Berkeley, California.

In 1979, the Providence Zen Center moved from its location in Providence to its current space in Cumberland, Rhode Island. The Kwan Um School of Zen was founded in 1983, and in July of that year, construction began on a Korean-style zen monastery on the grounds of Providence Zen Center. Opening ceremonies for the monastery were held in July 1984. By the summer of 1984, there were four zen centers and three additional zen groups in Poland.

By the time of Seung Sahn's death in 2004, he had established nearly 40 zen centers.

The Kwan Um School of Zen has one of only a few Zen centers located in Israel with their Tel Aviv Zen Center, led by Revital Dan. It is one of only four Kwan Um School Zen centers in Israel, with its history linked to trips by Seung Sahn to Israel in the 1990s to teach at various alternative medicine centers. According to Lionel Obadia, "Revital Dan, currently heading the TAZC, followed Seung Sahn back to Korea and trained in the monastic style of retreat. Back in Israel with her Dharma-teacher degree, she founded a Zen group. The opening ceremony of the TAZC took place in January 1999. The activities of the Kwan Um School have received widespread media coverage and the number of attendees is increasing." The other three centers in Israel practicing in the KUSZ are the Hasharon Zen Center, the Ramat Gan Zen Group and the Pardes Hanna Zen Centre.

== Characteristics ==
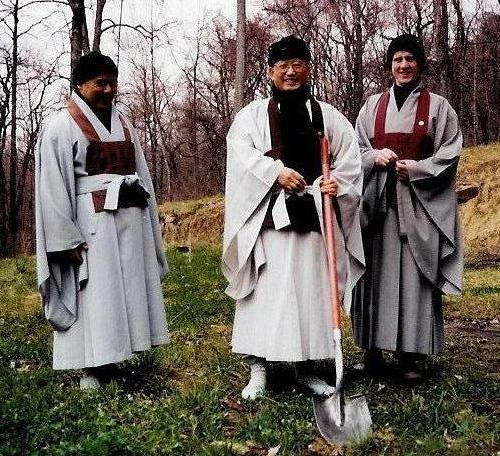
Left to right: Subong, Seung Sahn and Dae Gak

According to the book Religion and Public Life in the Pacific Northwest edited by Patricia O'Connell Killen and Mark Silk,

Mu Soeng, a longtime monk, describes the Kwan Um School as a unique amalgam of elements of Pure Land and Zen, chanting the name of the bodhisattva of compassion, and vigorous prostrations that are characteristic of Korean folk Buddhist practice. The Kwan Um School emphasizes socially engaged 'together action' by groups of followers living in a common house, koan or mantra practice tools, and a pastor-parishioner relationship between monks and laypersons characteristic of the Chogye order in Korea.

As Mu Soeng indicates, one of the key tenets to practice is what Seung Sahn often called "together action." Many members actually live in the zen centers, and one of the rules is that personal biases must be set aside for the good of the community.

At the time of his arrival in America, Seung Sahn's teachings were different from many Japanese Zen Masters who had arrived in the United States to teach Zen Buddhism to Americans. During the early days he did not place a strong emphasis on seated meditation, which is the core of most Japanese traditions of Zen, but rather on Koans. It was through the urging of some of his first students, some of whom had practiced in Japanese schools previously, that Seung Sahn came to place a stronger emphasis on sitting meditation. In addition to seated meditation, chanting and prostrations are very important forms of meditation for the school, aimed at clearing the mind of students.

The school website says, "Prostrations could be likened to the 'emergency measure' for clearing the mind. They are a very powerful technique for seeing the karma of a situation because both the mind and the body are involved. Something that might take days of sitting to digest may be digested in a much shorter time with prostrations. The usual practice here is to do 1000 bows a day (actually 1080). This can be done all at once or as is usually the case, spread out through the day." The number of prostrations students often perform varies in part on their physical ability, though at least 108 and up to 1080 per day is usual. Also unique in the KUSZ is the fact that celibacy is not required of those who are ordained. Rather, Seung Sahn created the idea of a "Bodhisattva Monk," which essentially is an individual who can be married and hold a job but also be a monk in the order. This status has now been superseded in the KUSZ by "Bodhisattva Teacher", who takes the 48 precepts but is not considered an ordained monk.

Seung Sahn also held unorthodox views on Zen practice in Western culture, and was open to the idea of his dharma heirs starting their own schools as he had done. Seung Sahn is quoted as having said, "As more Zen Masters appear, their individual styles will emerge. Perhaps some of them will make their own schools. So maybe, slowly, this Korean style will disappear and be replaced by an American style or American styles. But the main line does not change." Author Kenneth Kraft offers an apt quote from Seung Sahn on the issue of Zen and Western culture in his book Zen, Tradition and Transition (pp. 194–195),

When Bodhidharma came to China, he became the First Patriarch of Zen. As the result of a 'marriage' between Vipassana-style Indian meditation and Chinese Taoism, Zen appeared. Now it has come to the West, and what is already here? Christianity, Judaism, and so forth. When Zen 'gets married' to one of these traditions, a new style of Buddhism will appear. Perhaps there will be a woman Matriarch and all Dharma transmission will go only from woman to woman. Why not? So everyone, you must create American Buddhism." In The Faces of Buddhism in America edited by Charles S. Prebish, Mu Soeng states that, "A case has been made that the culture of Kwan um Zen School is hardly anything more than an expression of Seung Sahn's personality as it has been shaped by the Confucian-Buddhist amalgam in Korea during the last thousand years.

== Kyol Che ==
During the summer and winter months, The Kwan Um School of Zen offers a Kyol Che (meaning "tight dharma")—a 21- to 90-day intensive silent meditation retreat. In Korea, both the summer and winter Kyol Che last a duration of 90 days, while the Providence Zen Center offers three weeks in the summer and 90 days in winter. Arrangements can be made for shorter stays for those with busy schedules. A Kyol Che provides a structured environment for meditators. Participation in one of these intensive retreats offers individuals the chance to free themselves from intellectual attachments and develop compassion. Participants have no contact with the outside world while undergoing a retreat, and the only literature permitted are those works written by Seung Sahn. They are in practice from 4:45 a.m. to 9:45 p.m. each day, and are not permitted to keep a diary during their stay. Talking is only permitted when absolute necessity arises and during dokusan (Chinese: 獨參), a private meeting with a teacher. The school also offers Yong Maeng Jong Jins, which are two- to seven-day silent retreats complete with dokusan with a Ji Do Poep Sa Nim or Soen Sa Nim (Zen master).

== Hierarchy ==
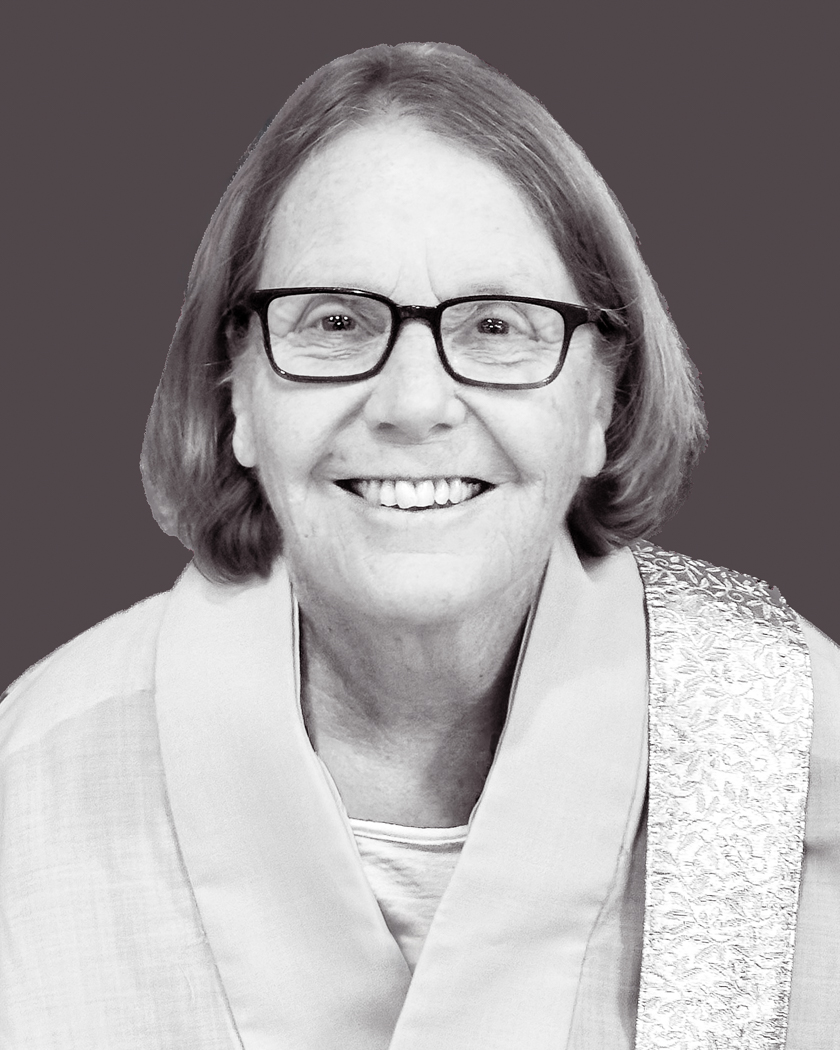
Zen Master Soeng Hyang (Barbara 'Bobby' Rhodes), current guiding teacher

There are essentially four kinds of teachers in the Kwan Um tradition, all having attained a varying degree of mastery and understanding.

1. A dharma teacher is an individual that has taken the Ten Precepts, completed a minimum of four years of training and a minimum of eight weekend retreats, understood basic Zen teaching, and has been confirmed by a Soen Sa Nim to receive the title. These individuals can give a Dharma talk but may not respond to audience questions.
2. A senior Dharma teacher is a Dharma teacher who, after a minimum of five years, has been confirmed by a Soen Sa Nim and has taken the Sixteen precepts. These individuals are given greater responsibility than a Dharma teacher, are able to respond to questions during talks, and give consulting interviews.
3. A Ji Do Poep Sa Nim (JDPSN or "dharma master"; jido beopsa-nim; 지도법사님; 指導法師님) is an authorized individual that has completed kōan (Korean: Kong-an) training, having received inka (permission to teach), and is capable of leading a long silent retreat ('Kyol Che'). Completing kōan training is the first step toward becoming a JDPSN, followed by a nomination to receive inka by a Zen Master. There is no standard for measuring whether someone has completed their kōan training and many students who pass all kōans in the Kwan Um "12 Gates" are not nominated for inka. The individual is then assessed by five Dharma teachers, one being the nominating party, and the other four being independent Dharma teachers. The nominee must demonstrate an aptitude for the task of teaching, showing the breadth of their understanding in their daily conduct. Should the nominee be approved to be granted the title of JDPSN, a ceremony is held thereafter and the student engages in lively public Dharma combat with a number of students and teachers. They are then given a kasa and keisaku and undergo a period of teacher training.
4. A Soen Sa Nim (Zen Master; seonsa-nim; 선사님; 禪師님) is a JDPSN that has received full Dharma transmission master to master. The title is most often used in reference to Seung Sahn, but all Zen masters in the Kwan Um tradition have the title Soen Sa Nim.

An Abbot serves a Zen center in an administrative capacity and does not necessarily provide spiritual direction, though many also serve as guiding teachers.

School Zen Master

- Soeng Hyang / Barbara 'Bobby' Rhodes

Other Zen Masters

- Wu Kwang / Richard Schrobe (Regional Zen Master, Americas)
- Dae Bong Sunim (Regional Zen Master, Asia, Australia, Africa)
- Bon Shim / Aleksandra Porter (Regional Zen Master, Europe)
- Bon Yeon / Jane Dobisz
- Su Bong (deceased)
- Wu Bong (deceased)
- Hae Kwang / Stan Lombardo
- Bon Haeng / Mark Houghton
- Bon Soeng / Jeff Kitzes
- Dae Kwan Sunim
- Chong Gak Shim
- Dae Soen Haeng
- Bon Hae / Judy Roitman
- Ji Haeng

Inactive

- Sogong

New schools

- Bomun (George Bowman)
- Dae Gak
- Ji Bong (Golden Wind Zen Order)

== Controversies ==
In 1988, Zen Master Seung Sahn admitted that he had had sexual relations with a few of his students. According to Sandy Boucher in Turning the Wheel: American Women Creating the New Buddhism:

The sexual affairs were apparently not abusive or hurtful to the women. By all accounts, they were probably strengthening and certainly gave the women access to power. (However, no one can know if other women were approached by Soen Sa Nim, said nothing, and may have been hurt or at best confused, and left silently.) No one questions that Soen Sa Nim is a strong and inspiring teacher and missionary, wholly committed to spreading the Dharma, who has helped many people by his teachings and by his creation of institutions in which they can practice Zen. In his organization he has empowered students, some of them women, by giving them the mandate to teach and lead. And he has speculated, in a positive vein, on the coming empowerment of women in religion and government. Even his critics describe him as a dynamic teacher from whom they learned a great deal.

James Ishmael Ford had this to say on the relationships:

For a while the future direction of Seung Sahn's institution was in doubt, and, as happened in the similarly affected Japanese-derived centers, quite a number of people left. It's not possible to adequately acknowledge the hurt and dismay that followed in the wake of these and similar scandals at other centers. In part because of their willingness to address the reality of ethical concerns, The Kwan Um School is now the single largest unified Zen School operating in the West.

The Kwan Um School of Zen has since developed an ethics policy that has guidelines for teacher/student relationships and consequences for unethical behavior.

== Gallery ==
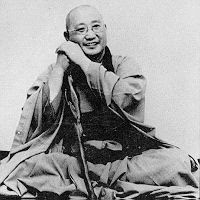
Zen Master Seung Sahn

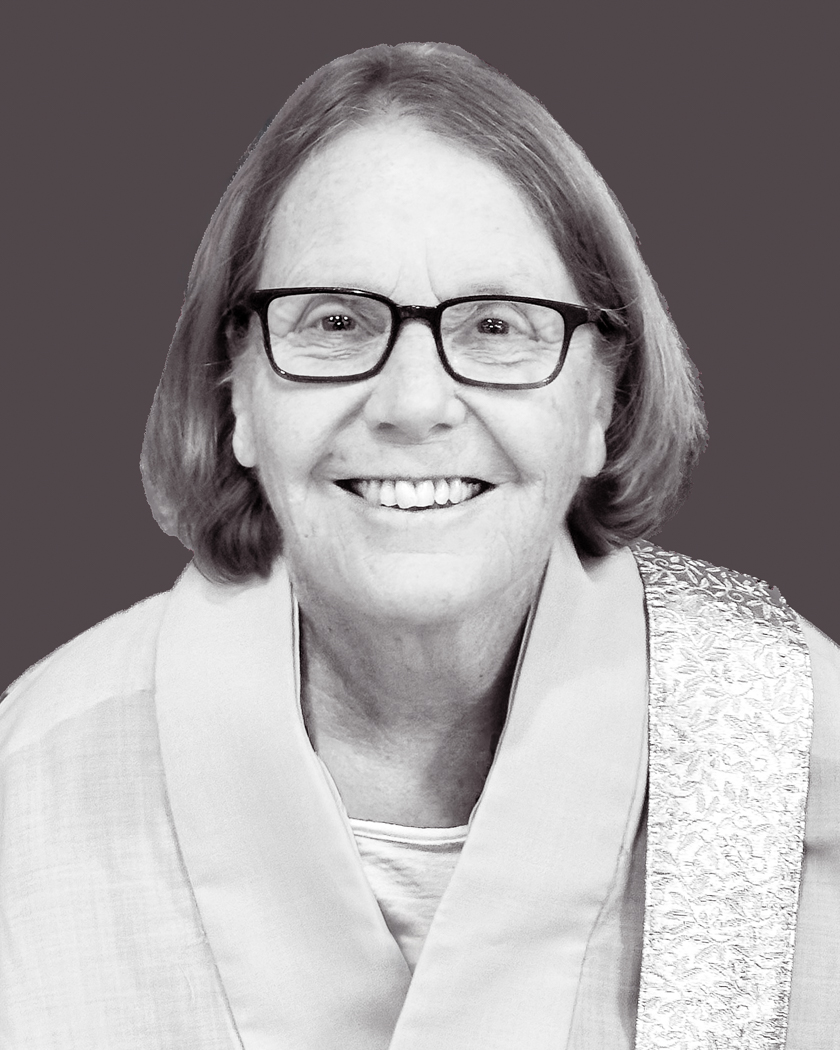
Zen Master Soenghyang (Barbara Rhodes)

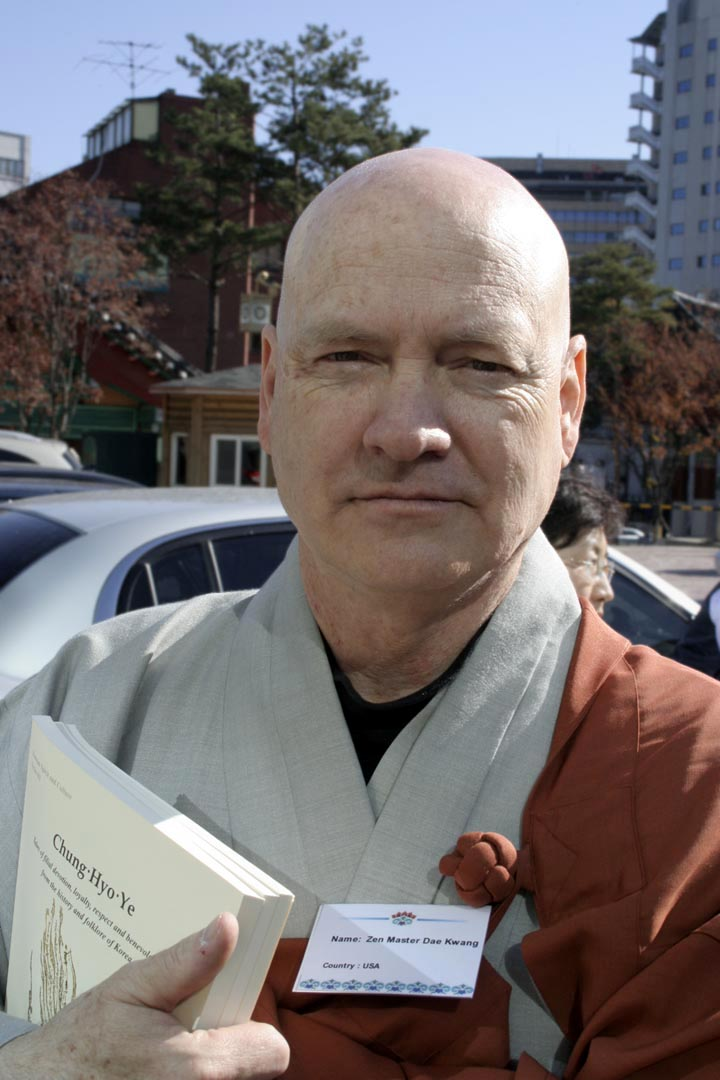
Dae Kwang

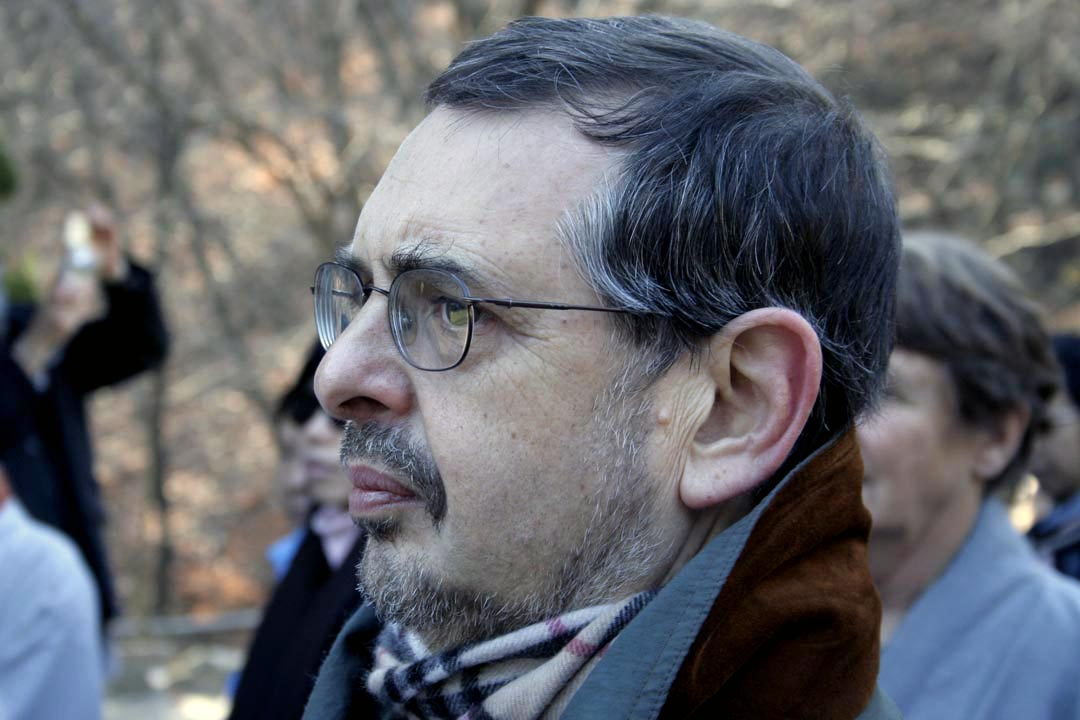
Wu Kwang

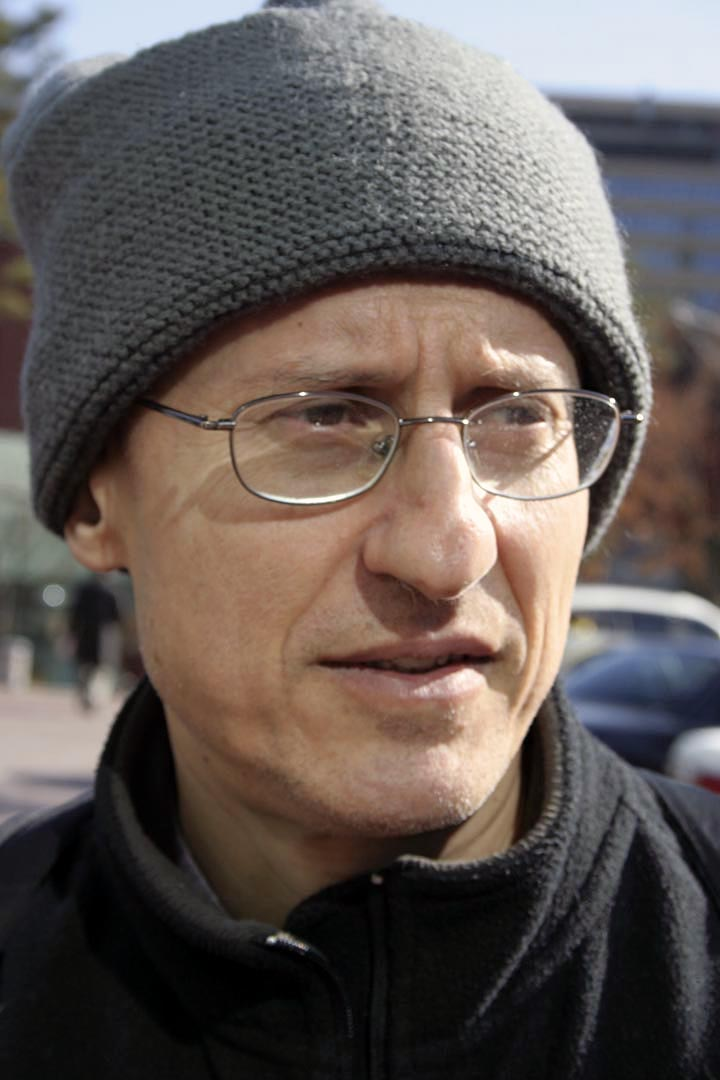
Wu Bong

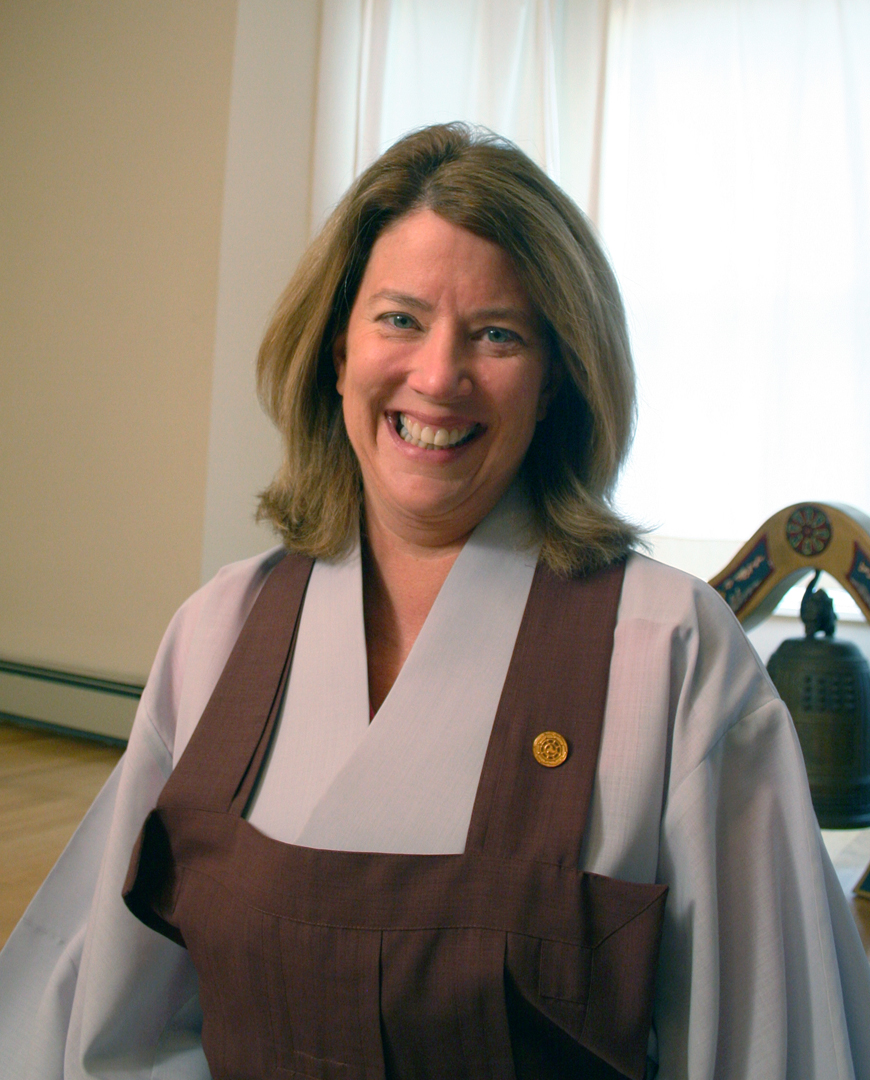
Bon Yeon

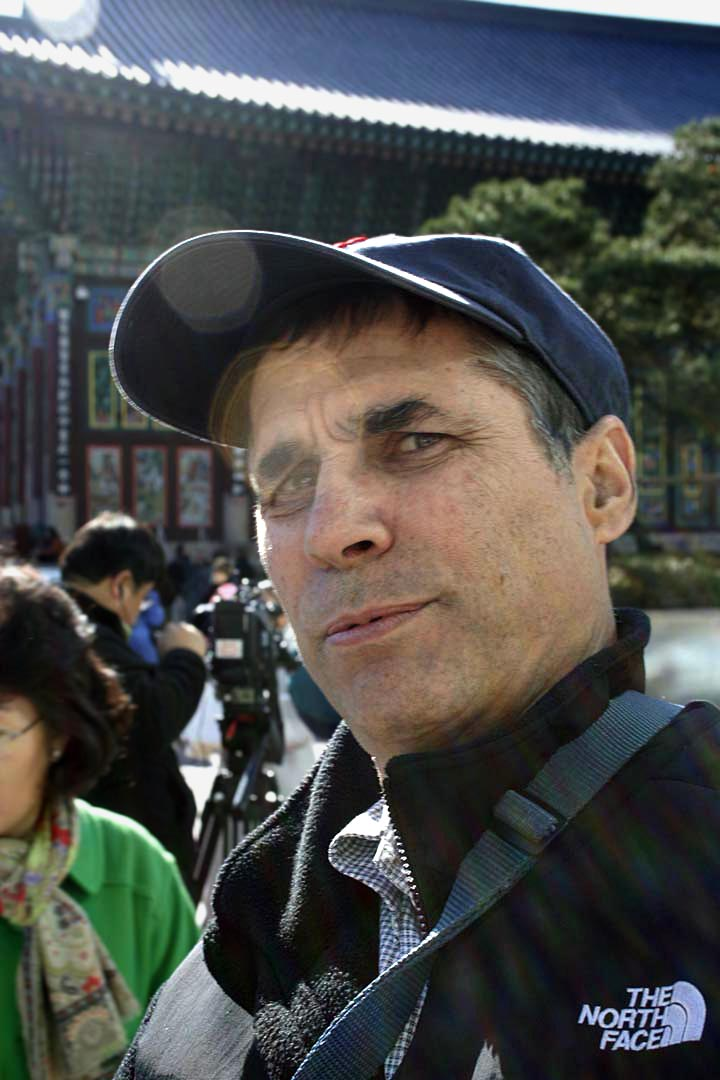
Bon Haeng

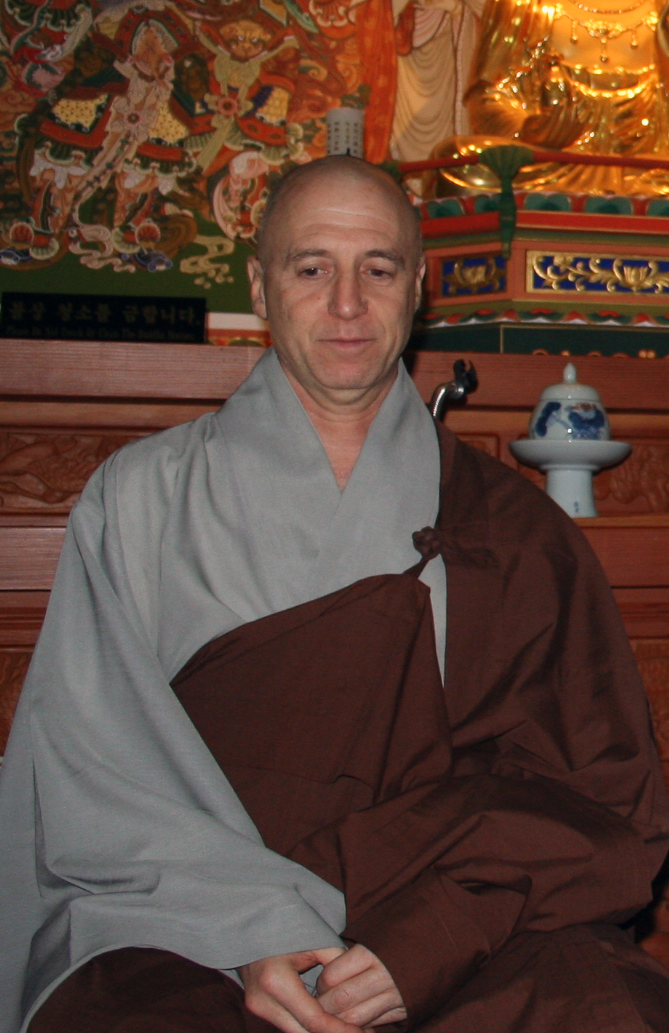
Dae Bong

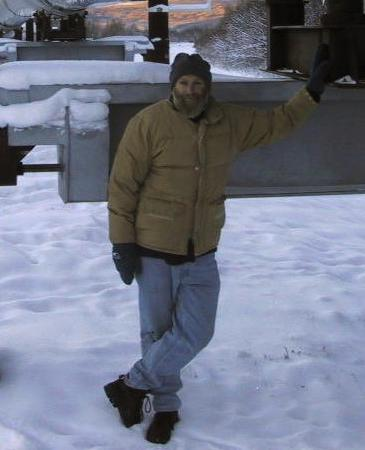
Bon Soeng

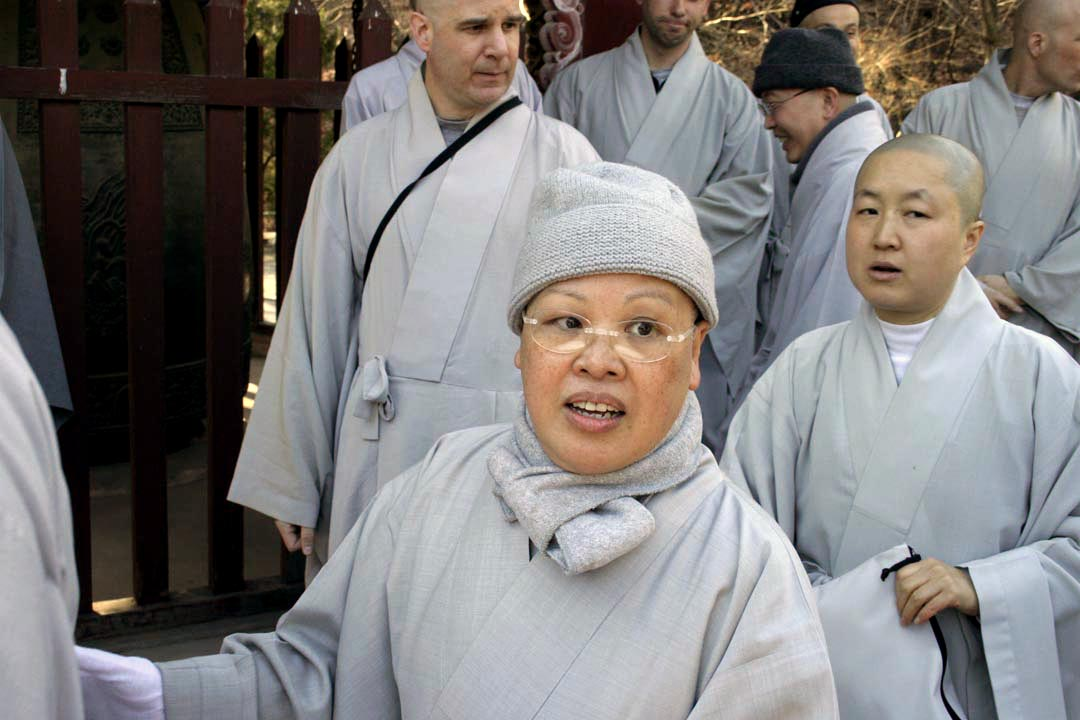
Dae Kwan

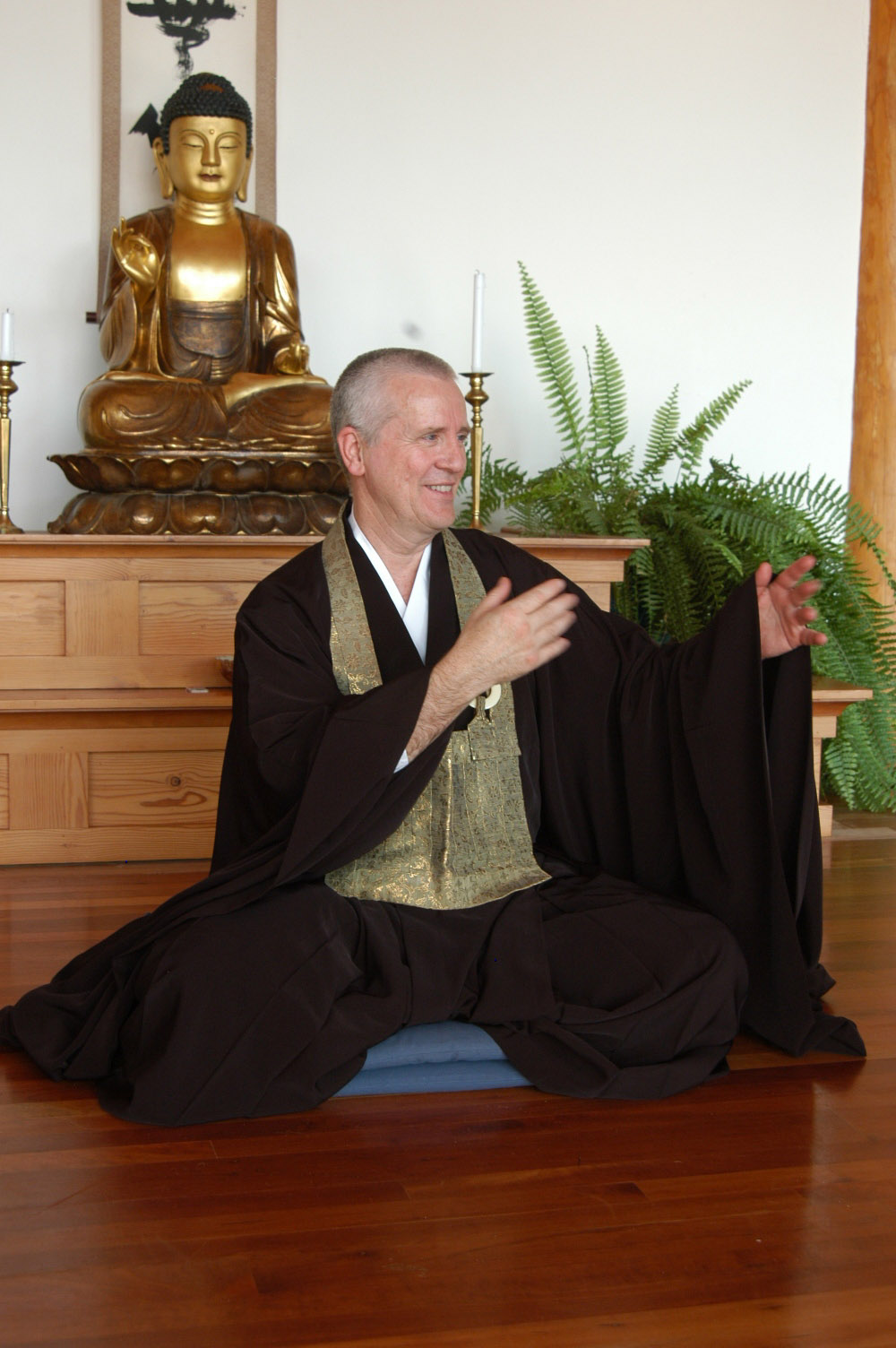
Dae Gak

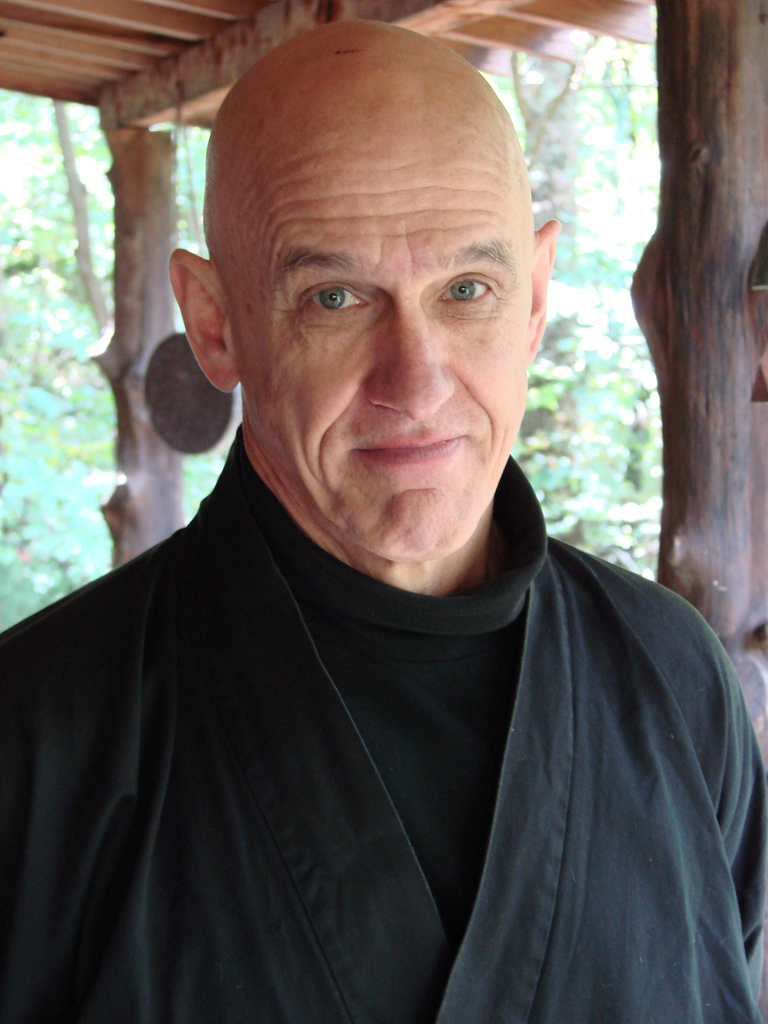
George Bowman (Bomun)

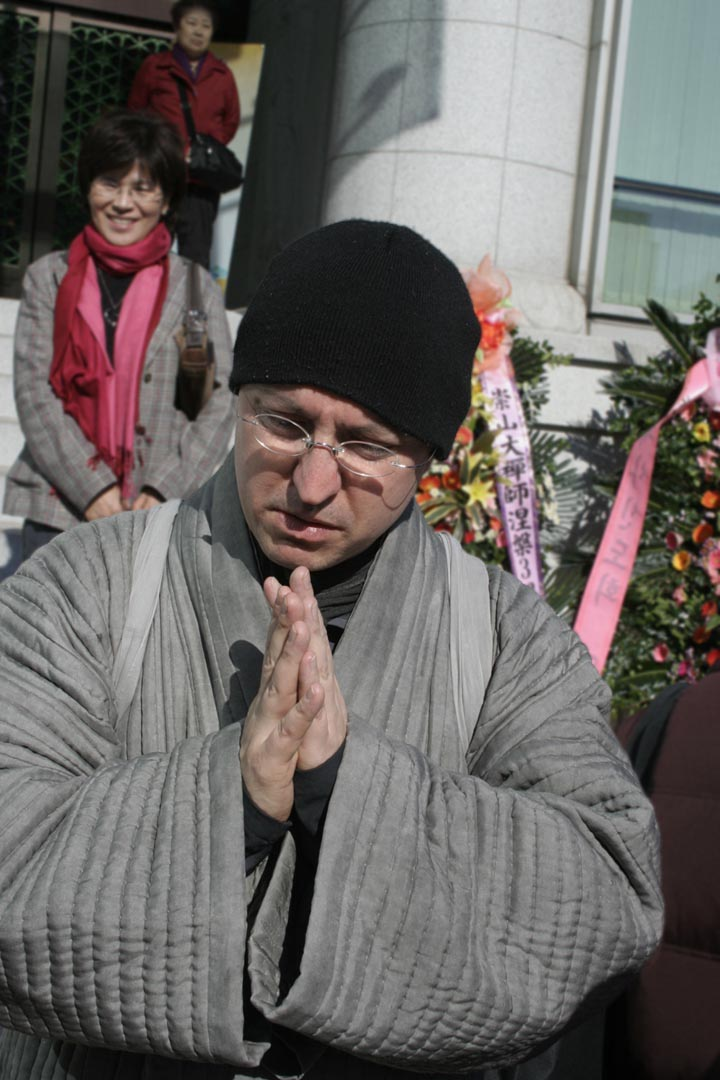
Hyon Gak Sunim

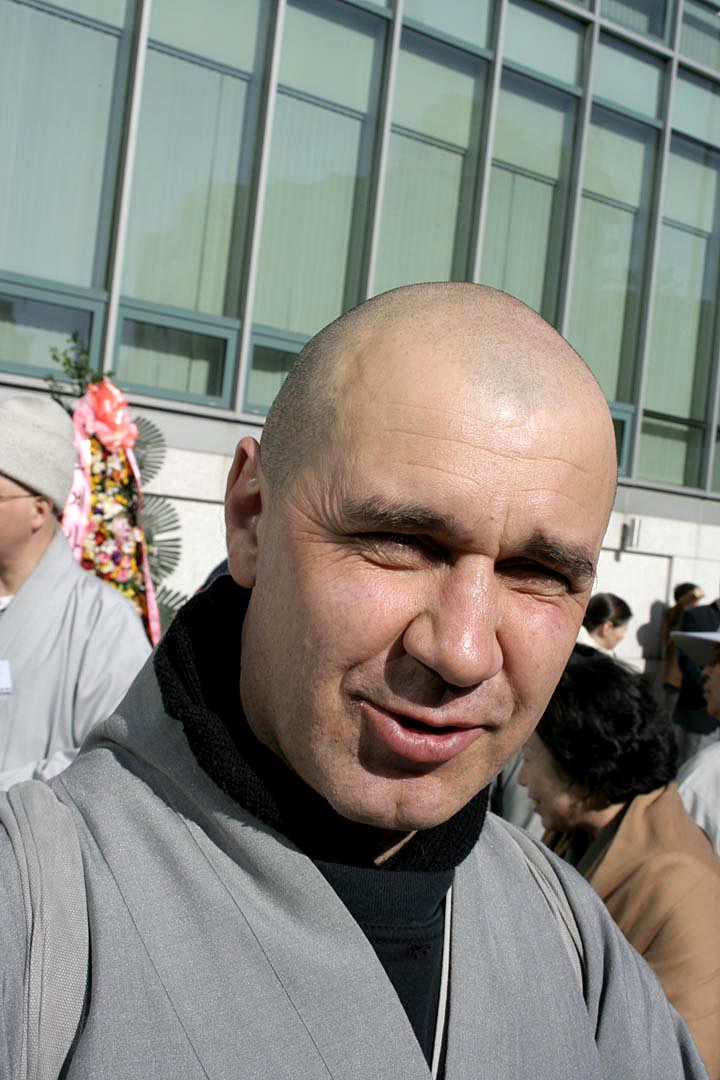
Bo Haeng Sunim

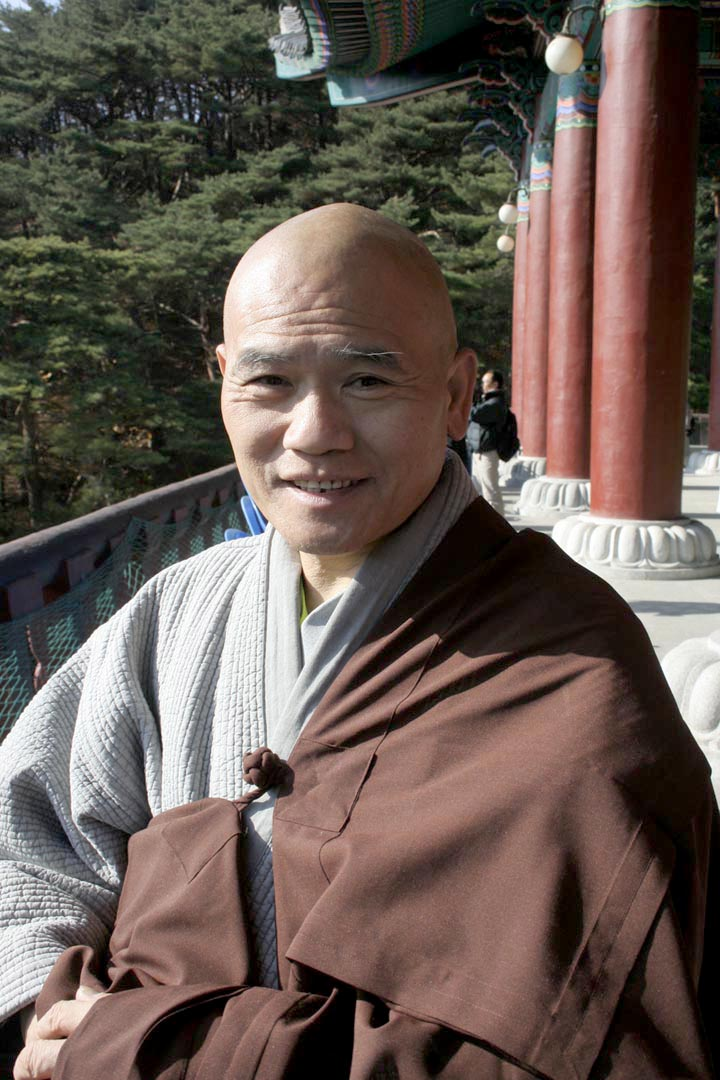
Dae Won Sunim

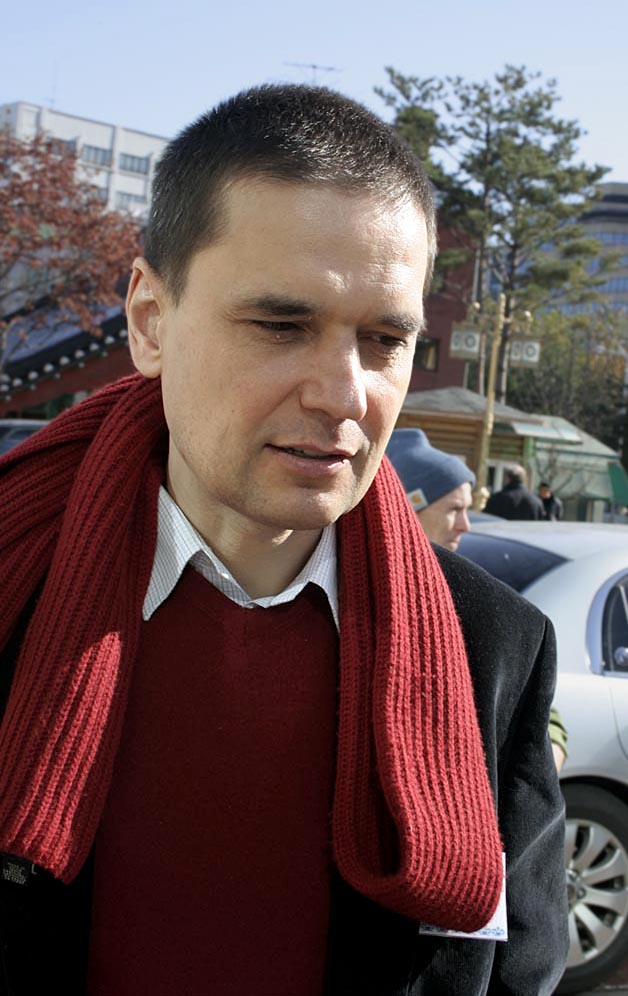
Andrzej Stec, JDPSN

== See also ==
- Korean Buddhism
- Buddhism in the United States
- Providence Zen Center
- Cambridge Zen Center
- Chogye International Zen Center
- Musangsa
- Tel Aviv Zen Center
- Timeline of Zen Buddhism in the United States
- The Compass of Zen
- Wonkwangsa International Zen Temple
