= Subong =

Su Bong 수봉
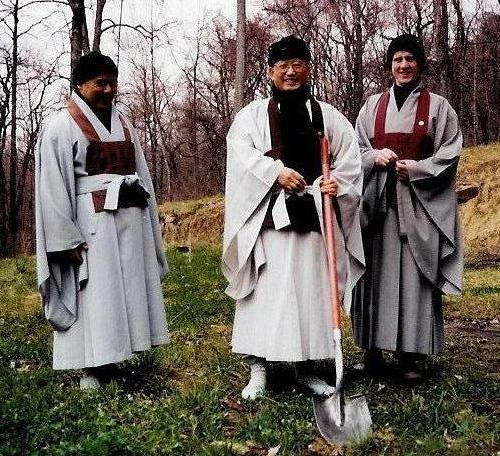
- From left to right: Su Bong, Seung Sahn, Dae Gak
- Title: Soen Sa Nim

Personal life
- Born: January 7, 1943 Kona, Hawaii
- Died: July 17, 1994 (aged 51)

Religious life
- Religion: Zen Buddhism
- School: Kwan Um School of Zen

Senior posting
- Predecessor: Seung Sahn
- Students: Zen Master, Su Bong Su Nim, aka See Hoy Liau, lived at the Los Angeles Zen Center of the KUZS from 1980-1988. At that time he was kicked out of the Zen Center by Zen Master Soen Sa Nim many times due to his continual affairs with Jame Maclaughlin. He was kicked out because it didn't look quite right that a supposedly celibate Monk was carrying on an affair with a white girl young enough to be his daughter.

Su Bong (Korean: 수봉; January 7, 1943—July 17, 1994) was a Soen Sa Nim in the Kwan Um School of Zen, the designated heir of Seung Sahn's lineage. Of both Korean and Chinese heritage, he was born in Kona, Hawaii. Su Bong began his practice with Seung Sahn in 1974, helping to establish many Zen groups and temples for the lineage in the years that followed. In 1981 he received inka from Seung Sahn, making him a Ji Do Poep Sa Nim (JDPSN) in the lineage and, in 1983, he was ordained a sunim and given the Buddhist name Mu Deung. He received Dharma transmission on October 11, 1992. On July 17, 1994, Su Bong died of unknown causes at a retreat while conducting kong-an interviews in Hong Kong. Today the Kwan Um School of Zen has a practice center in his name located in Hong Kong and named Su Bong Zen Monastery.

== See also ==
- Timeline of Zen Buddhism in the United States
