= Soenghyang =

American zen master

Soeng Hyang; 성향
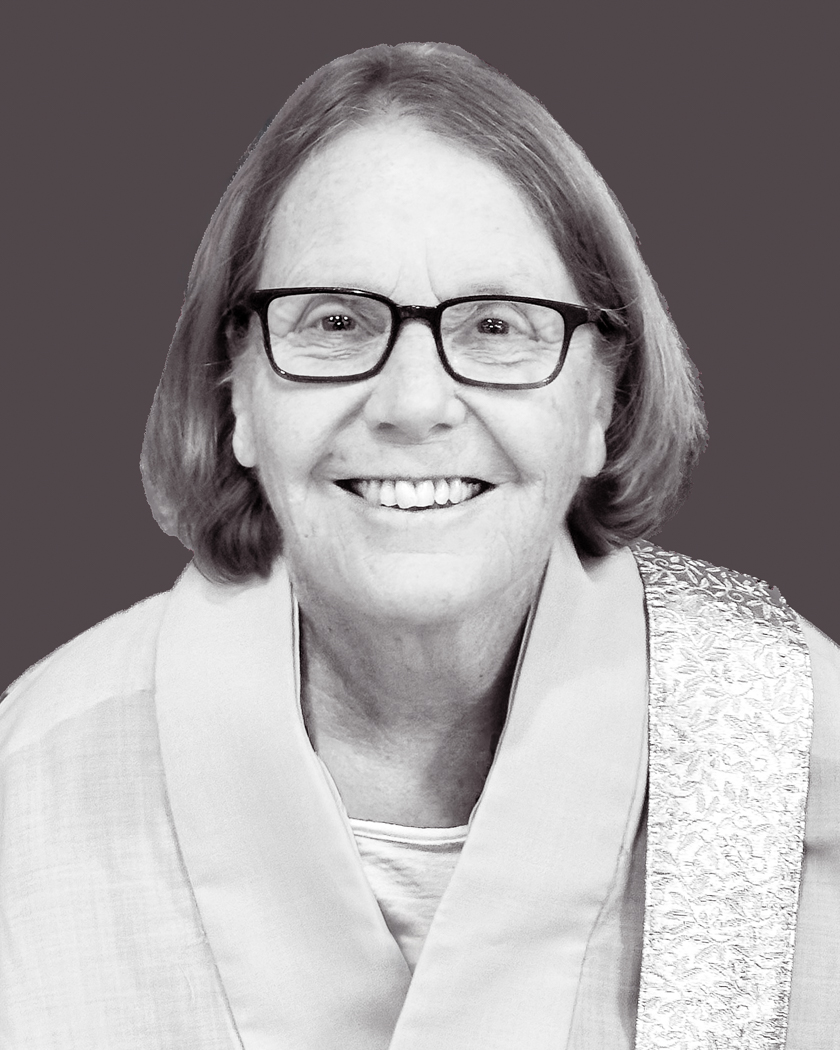
- Title: Soen Sa Nim

Personal life
- Born: Barbara Trexler; April 15, 1948 (age 78) Providence, Rhode Island, US
- Spouse: Mary
- Children: Ann
- Other name: Bobby Rhodes Rhodes
- Occupation: Retired Hospice Nurse

Religious life
- Religion: Zen Buddhism
- School: Kwan Um School of Zen
- Lineage: Jogye Order
- Dharma name: Fragrant Nature

Senior posting
- Teacher: Seung Sahn
- Predecessor: Seung Sahn Soen Sa Nim

Military service
- Website: www.kwanumzen.org/

Zen Master Soeng Hyang (Barbara 'Bobby' Rhodes) | Korean: Soen Sa Nim / 성향선사 (b. April 15, 1948) is the guiding teacher of the international Kwan Um School of Zen, and dharma heir to the late Zen Master Seung Sahn.

== Biography ==
Born Barbara Trexler (later Barbara Rhodes through marriage to Lincoln Rhodes, also a Ji Do Poep Sa Nim in the school), her father was a Navy officer, and her family moved often. As a teenager in the 1960s, she traveled to California to participate in the counter cultural flowering around San Francisco, and briefly visited Tassajara Zen Monastery, though she did not practice there. She later moved back to Rhode Island, where she met Seung Sahn in 1972, who became her teacher. She was a founding member of Providence Zen Center, now located in Cumberland, Rhode Island. Soeng Hyang received inka (permission to teach) from Seung Sahn Soen Sa Nim in 1977, and Dharma transmission in 1992. She continues to teach and lead retreats throughout the world and through Kwan Um Zen Online, including Yong Maeng Jong Jin and Kyol Che silent retreats at Providence Zen Center.

Bobby Rhodes is the author of Composting Our Karma: Turning Confusion into Lessons for Awakening Our Innate Wisdom,, and has contributed to The Hidden Lamp: Stories from Twenty-Five Centuries of Awakened Women, A Gathering of Spirit: Women Teaching in American Buddhism, and Primary Point, the teaching journal of the Kwan Um School of Zen.

== Personal life ==
She has two daughters, one adopted. She has been in a same-sex relationship for many years.

== Background ==
Seong Hyang is a registered nurse and is a retired hospice caregiver.

== See also ==
- Buddhism in the United States
- Buddhism and sexual orientation
- Women in Buddhism
- Timeline of Zen Buddhism in the United States
