= ADE (chemotherapy) =

- Specialty: Oncology

ADE is a chemotherapy regimen most often used as an induction or consolidation regimen in acute myelogenous leukemia, especially in poor-risk patients or those refractory to the standard first-line induction with standard "7+3" regimen or who are relapsed after the standard chemotherapy.

ADE regimen consists of three drugs:

1. Ara-C (cytarabine) - an antimetabolite;
2. Daunorubicin - an anthracycline antibiotic that is able to intercalate DNA and thus disrupt the cell division cycle, preventing mitosis;
3. Etoposide - a topoisomerase inhibitor.

== Dosing regimen ==
Drug	Dose	Mode	Days
Ara-C (cytarabine)	200 mg/m^{2}	IV push every 12 hours in 2 divided doses (100 mg/m^{2} each)	Days 1-10
Daunorubicin	50 mg/m^{2}	IV slow push	Days 1, 3 and 5
Etoposide	100 mg/m^{2}	IV infusion over 1 hour	Days 1-5
