= Cambridge Zen Center =

Meditation center in Massachusetts, US

Coordinates: 42.364468°N 71.106019°W

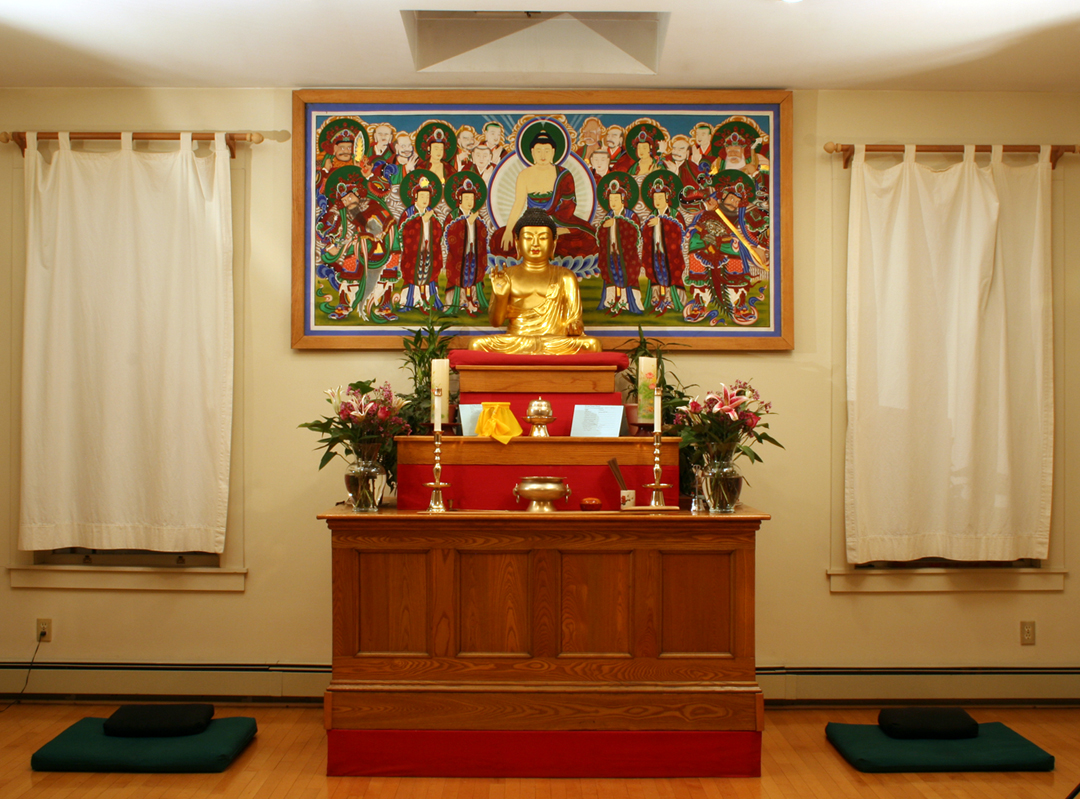
- Dharma room at the Cambridge Zen Center

Religion
- Affiliation: Zen

Location
- Location: 199 Auburn Street, Cambridge, MA 02139
- Country: Cambridge, MA, United States
- Interactive map of Cambridge Zen Center

Architecture
- Founder: Zen Master Seung Sahn
- Completed: 1973

Website
- www.cambridgezen.org

Cambridge Zen Center is an urban meditation center in Cambridge, Massachusetts, close to Harvard University, part of the Kwan Um School of Zen. Free meditation training and dharma talks are offered to the public and the Zen Center also provides a large (30-35 people) residential training program.

== Gallery ==
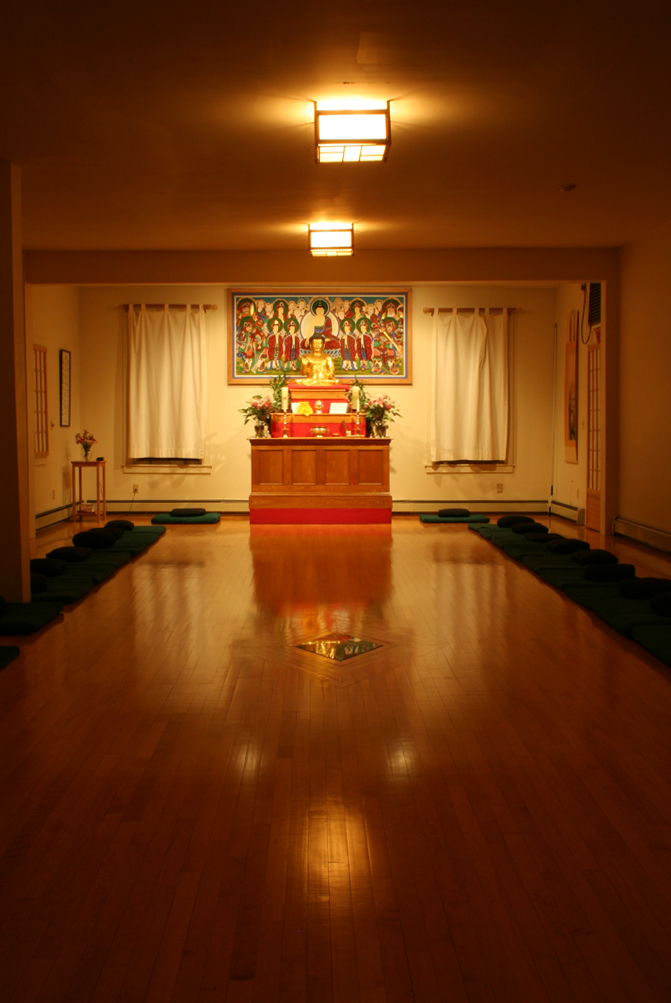
Dharma room

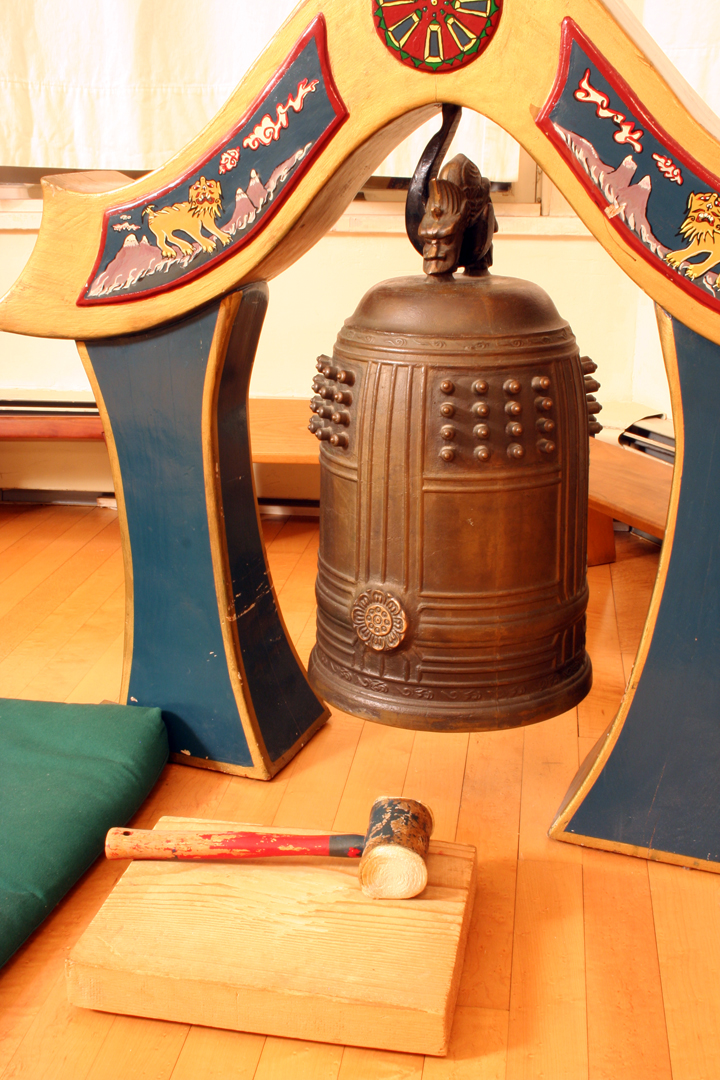

== See also ==
- Providence Zen Center
- Chogye International Zen Center
- Timeline of Zen Buddhism in the United States
