= Providence Zen Center =

Coordinates: 41.970426°N 71.430623°W

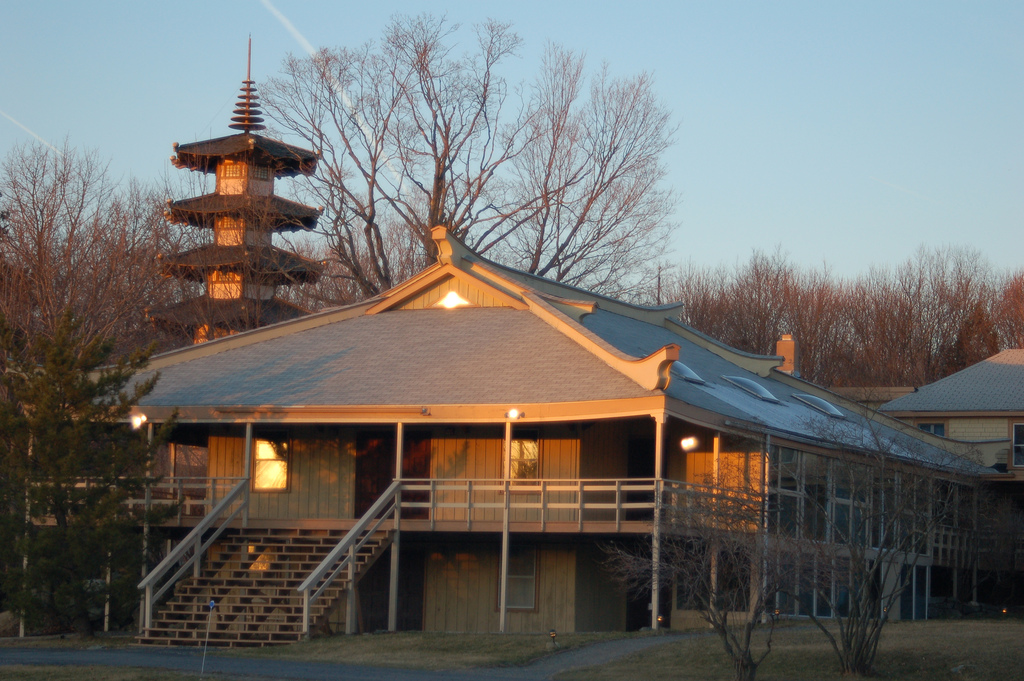

Religion
- Affiliation: Kwan Um School of Zen

Location
- Location: 99 Pound Road Cumberland, Rhode Island 02864
- Country: United States
- Interactive map of Providence Zen Center

Architecture
- Founder: Seungsahn
- Completed: 1972

Website
- www.providencezen.org/

Providence Zen Center (PZC) is the Head Temple of the Americas for the Kwan Um School of Zen (KUSZ) and the first Zen center established by Seungsahn in the United States in October 1972. PZC offers meditation classes and community programming, Zen retreats, temple stays, as well as residential training. Adjacent Diamond Hill Monastery hosts retreats and the traditional summer and winter Kyol Che. Practice forms include sitting and walking meditation, bows/prostrations, and chanting.

Providence Zen Center was originally located in Providence, Rhode Island, but in 1979 the center relocated to its current 50-acre site in Cumberland. One of the center's centerpiece landmarks is the Peace Pagoda, a towering 65-foot (20 m) high pagoda located at the front of the center grounds. PZC also serves as the U.S. headquarters for the Jogye Order of Korean Buddhism.

== History ==
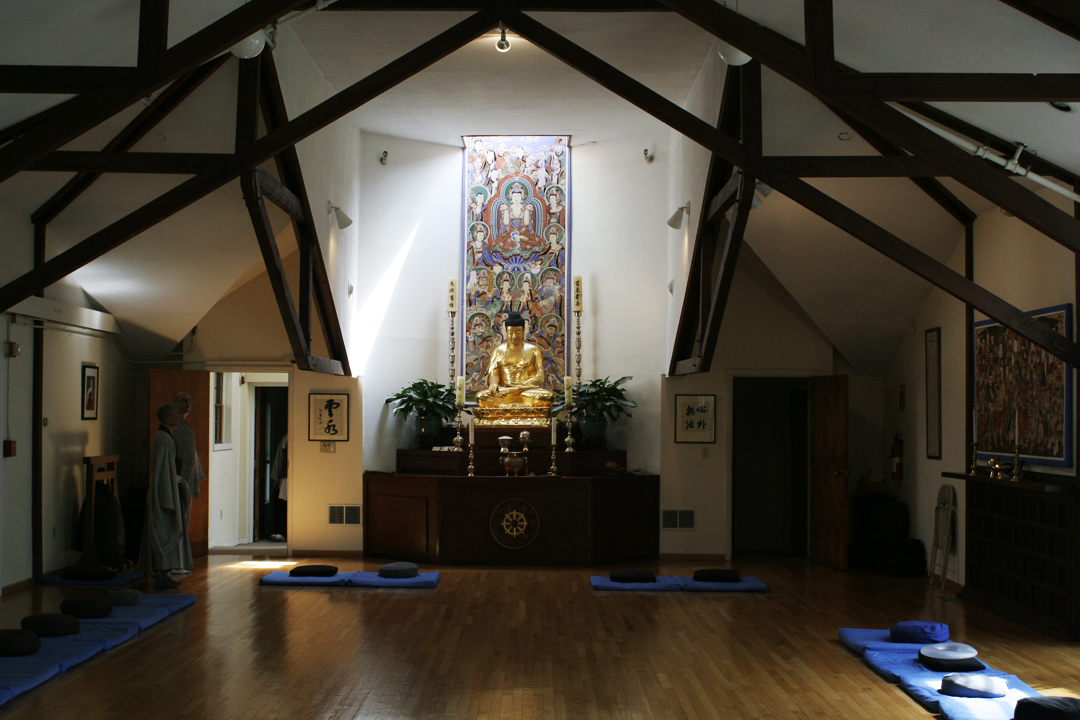
The Dharma Hall at PZC

Providence Zen Center was established by Zen Master Seung Sahn in October 1972 on Doyle Avenue in Providence, Rhode Island as the first practice center for his American students. The center came to be after Brown University professor Leo Pruden had invited Seung Sahn to give talks on Buddhism at the university, with several of the students thereafter coming to him for teachings. After relocating in 1974 to 48 Hope Street, the PZC came into possession of a 50-acre (200,000 m^{2}) plot of land in 1978 located in Cumberland, Rhode Island.

During the 1980s the PZC became a catalyst for opening the dialogue on the role of women in Zen Buddhism, becoming host to various discussion panels and conferences on feminist issues in the years to follow. In 1982 the center organized a discussion group for woman at the center. Then in 1983 the PZC offered a workshop called "Feminist Principles in Zen," led by Barbara 'Bobby' Rhodes (the current guiding teacher of the international Kwan Um School of Zen), Maurine Stuart, Jacqueline Schwartz and Susan Murcott. In 1984 and 1985 the center held "Women in American Buddhism" conferences and, according to the book The Encyclopedia of Women and Religion in North America, "[f]rom then on women's retreats and conferences became common."

From 1983—1984 the Kwan Um School of Zen constructed Diamond Hill Zen Monastery on the grounds of PZC, a "low, pagoda shaped building" built in the "traditional Korean-style [of] architecture", to serve as host for the semi-annual Kyol Che retreats. According to a longtime student of the Kwan Um School Mu Soeng, "[Seung Sahn] did not even insist that all his ordained American students make the monastery their home and contribute to its growth as a monastic center. Today it serves primarily as a retreat center for Kwan Um School of Zen members and lay Zen practitioners.

== Kyol Che ==
Providence Zen Center hosts a three-month Winter Kyol Che meditation retreat and a four-week Summer Kyol Che meditation retreat at the Diamond Hill Monastery.

== See also ==
- Cambridge Zen Center
- Musangsa
- Chogye International Zen Center
- Timeline of Zen Buddhism in the United States

== Gallery ==
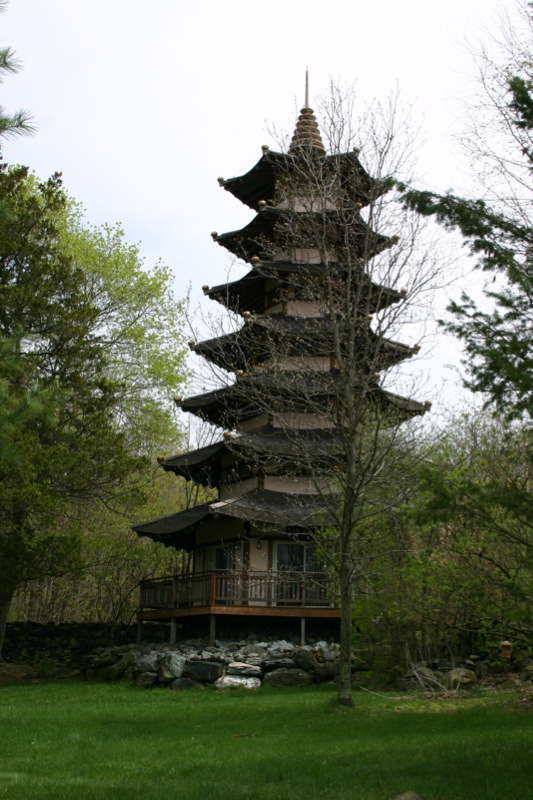
Peace Pagoda

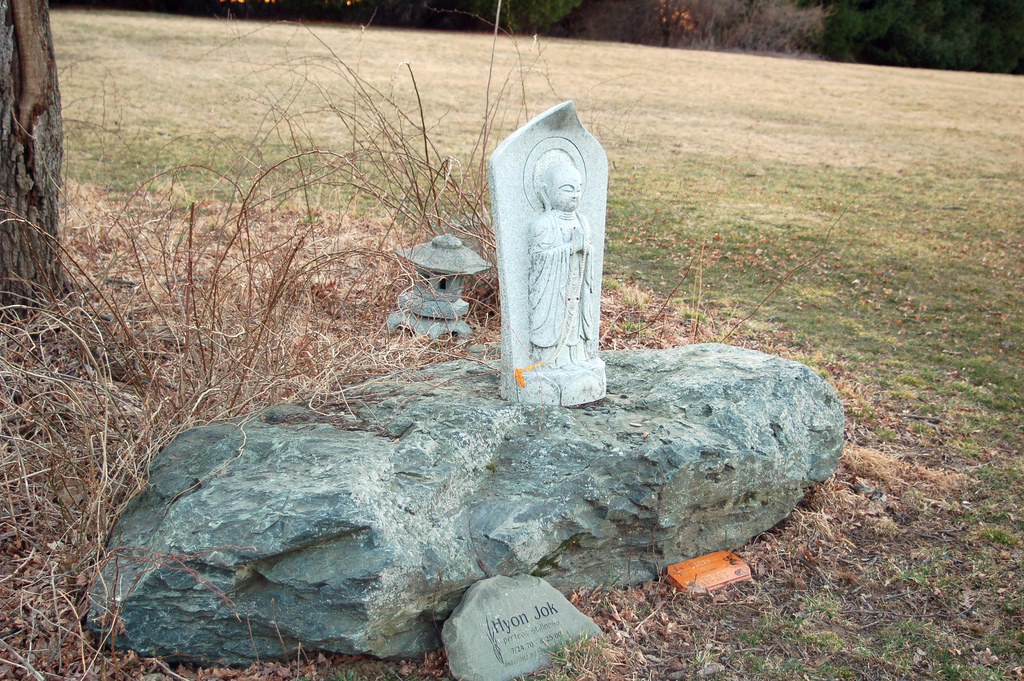
Grave of Hyon Jok at Providence Zen Center in Cumberland, RI
