= DAT (chemotherapy) =

- Specialty: Oncology

DAT in the context of chemotherapy is an acronym that means a chemotherapy regimen most often used as an induction regimen in acute myelogenous leukemia, usually for those who are refractory to the standard "7+3" induction regimen or who have relapsed. This regimen also can be used as primary, first-line induction therapy.

The DAT regimen consists of:

- Daunorubicin - an anthracycline antibiotic that is able to intercalate DNA, thus disrupting cell division and preventing mitosis
- Ara-C (cytarabine) - an antimetabolite
- Thioguanine - another antimetabolite

== Dosing regimen ==
Drug	Dose	Mode	Days
Ara-C (cytarabine)	200 mg/m^{2}	IV push every 12 hours in 2 divided doses (100 mg/m^{2} each)	Days 1-10
Daunorubicin	50 mg/m^{2}	IV slow push	Days 1, 3 and 5
Thioguanine	200 mg/m^{2}	PO every 12 hours in 2 divided doses (100 mg/m^{2} each)	Days 1-10
