= Divergent Association Task =

Psychological test

The Divergent Association Task (DAT), published in July 2021, is a psychological test designed to measure a person's creativity. The task involves naming ten nouns that differ as much as possible from each other. Here, the difference between two terms is understood in the semantic sense and is calculated by a special algorithm.

The test specifically measures a component of creativity called divergent thinking, which is the ability to find different solutions to open-ended problems.

There is an online version of the task created by the authors who developed the DAT (Jay A. Olson, Johnny Nahas, Denis Chmoulevitch, Simon J. Cropper, Margaret E. Webb).
