= Musangsa =

Zen center in South Korea

- 무상사 無上寺
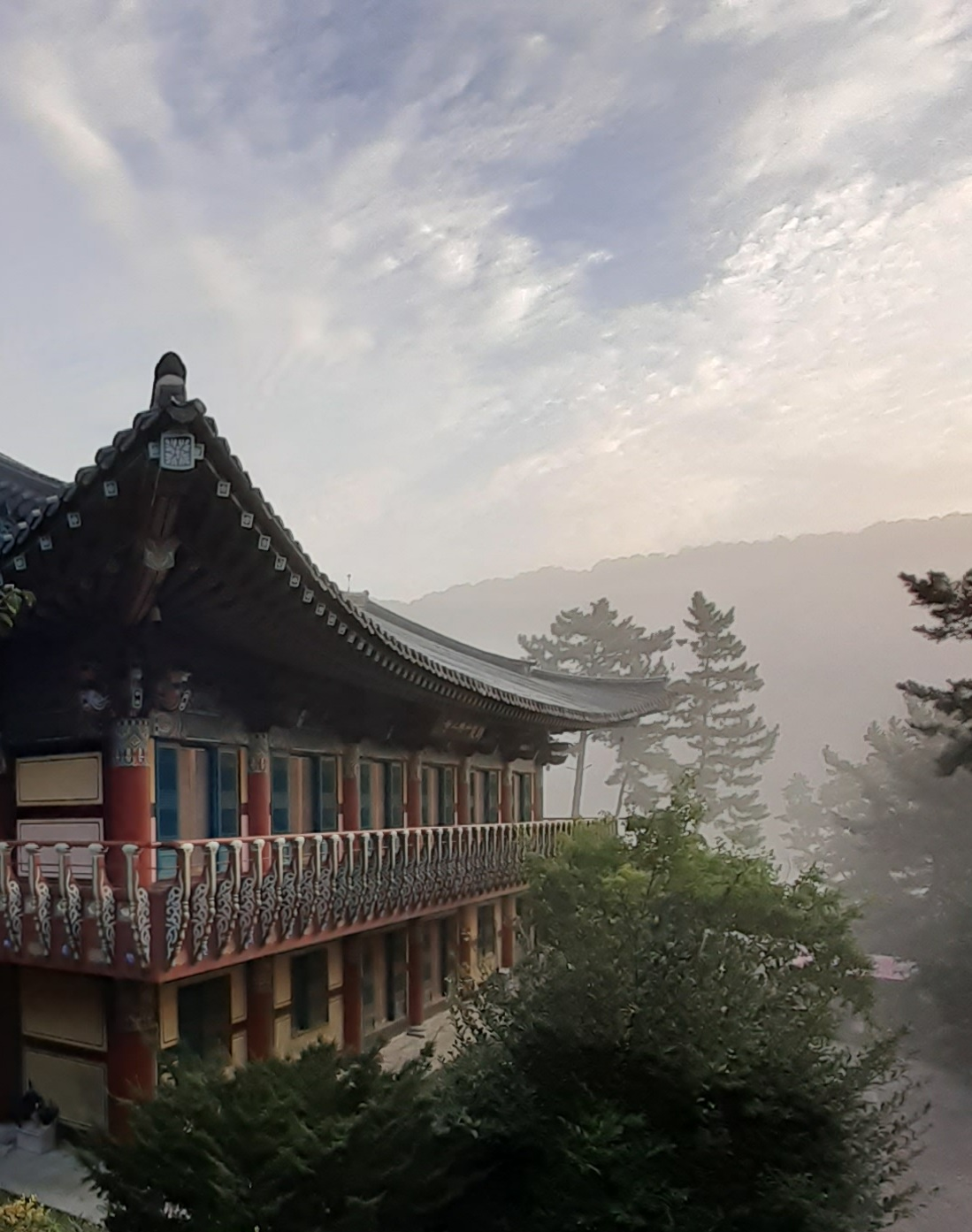
- Quiet practicing energy from the meditation hall During 90 days each in summer and winter, practitioners from around the world sit in silence at this meditation hall.

Religion
- Affiliation: Zen

Location
- Location: 129 Hyangjeoksan-gil, Eomsa-myeon, Gyeryong-si, Chungnam Prov., 32816
- Country: Daejon South Korea

Architecture
- Founder: Zen Master Seung Sahn
- Completed: 2000

Website
- www.musangsa.org

Musangsa (Seung Sahn International Zen Center) is an international zen center which follows the teachings of Zen Master Seung Sahn. Musangsa is the Head Temple in Asia of the international zen organization Kwan Um School of Zen. The temple holds 3 months silent retreats Kyolche each in summer and winter every year where monastics and lay practitioners practice together. It also serves as a training temple for monastics of Kwan Um zen lineage and hosts many foreign practitioners of the same lineage, providing them a chance to practice in Korea. Current main guiding teacher is Zen Master Dae Bong.

== Gallery ==
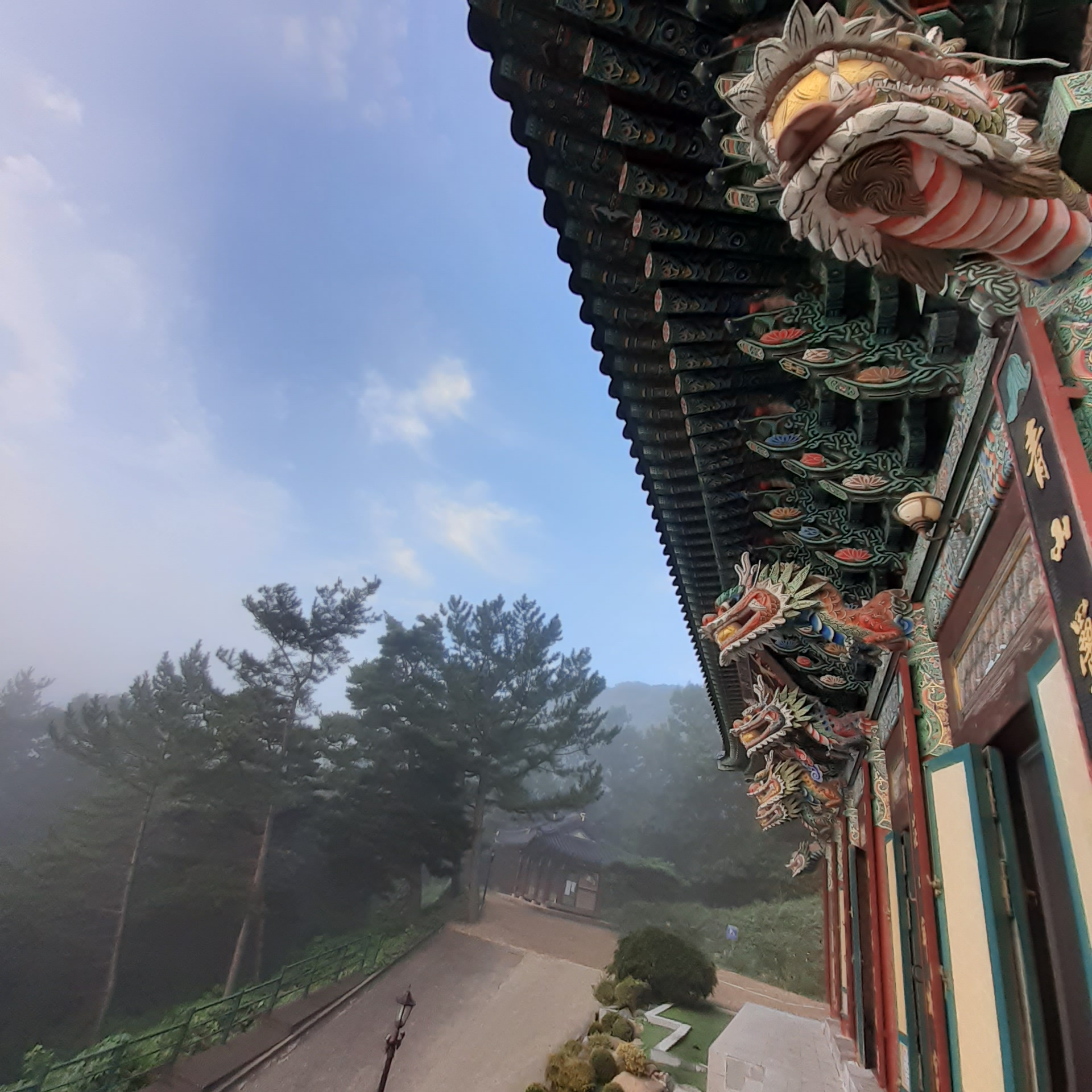
Mistic energy from Gyeryong (chicken dragon) Mountain flows down to Musangsa

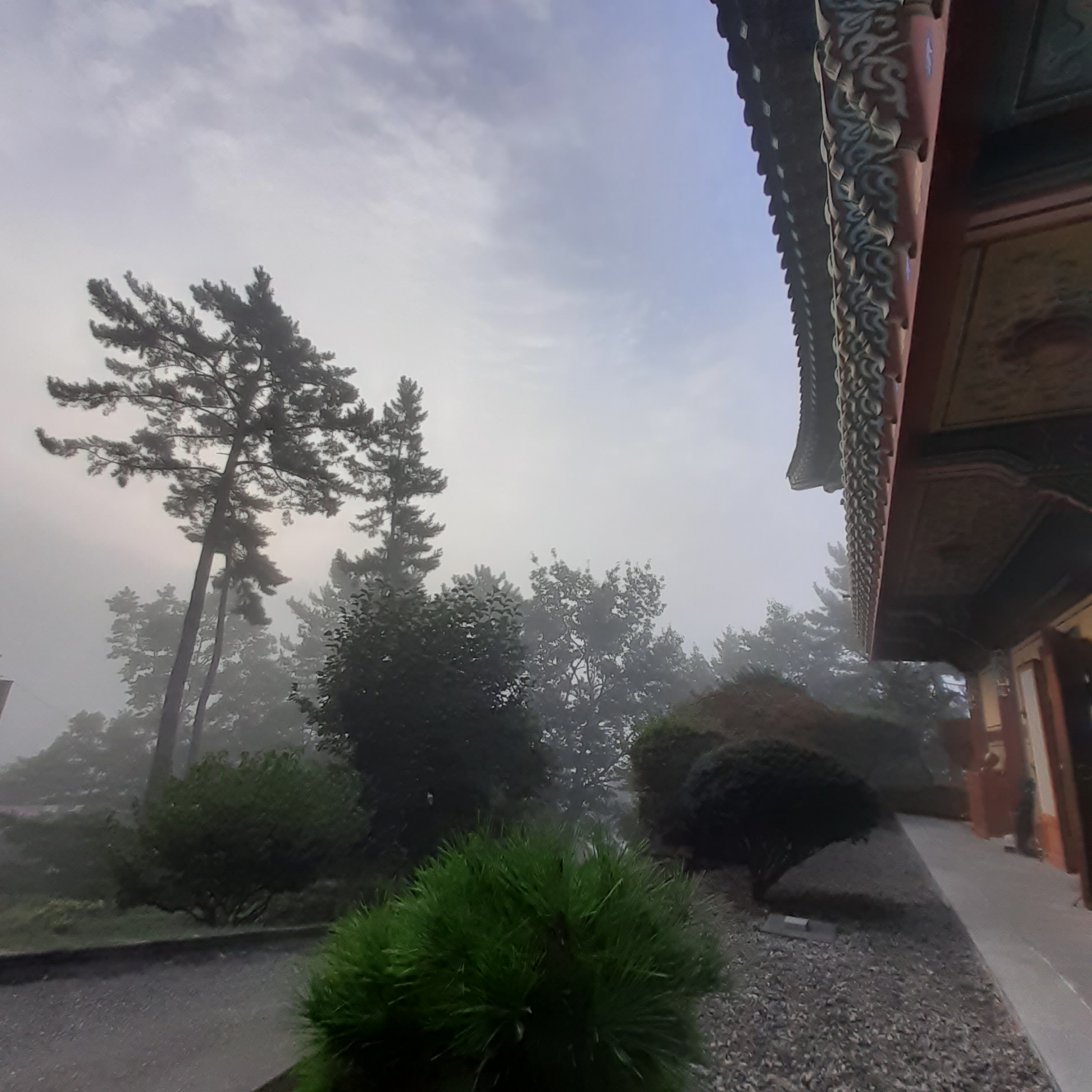
"A tree has no likes and dislikes" Trees outside of meditation hall.

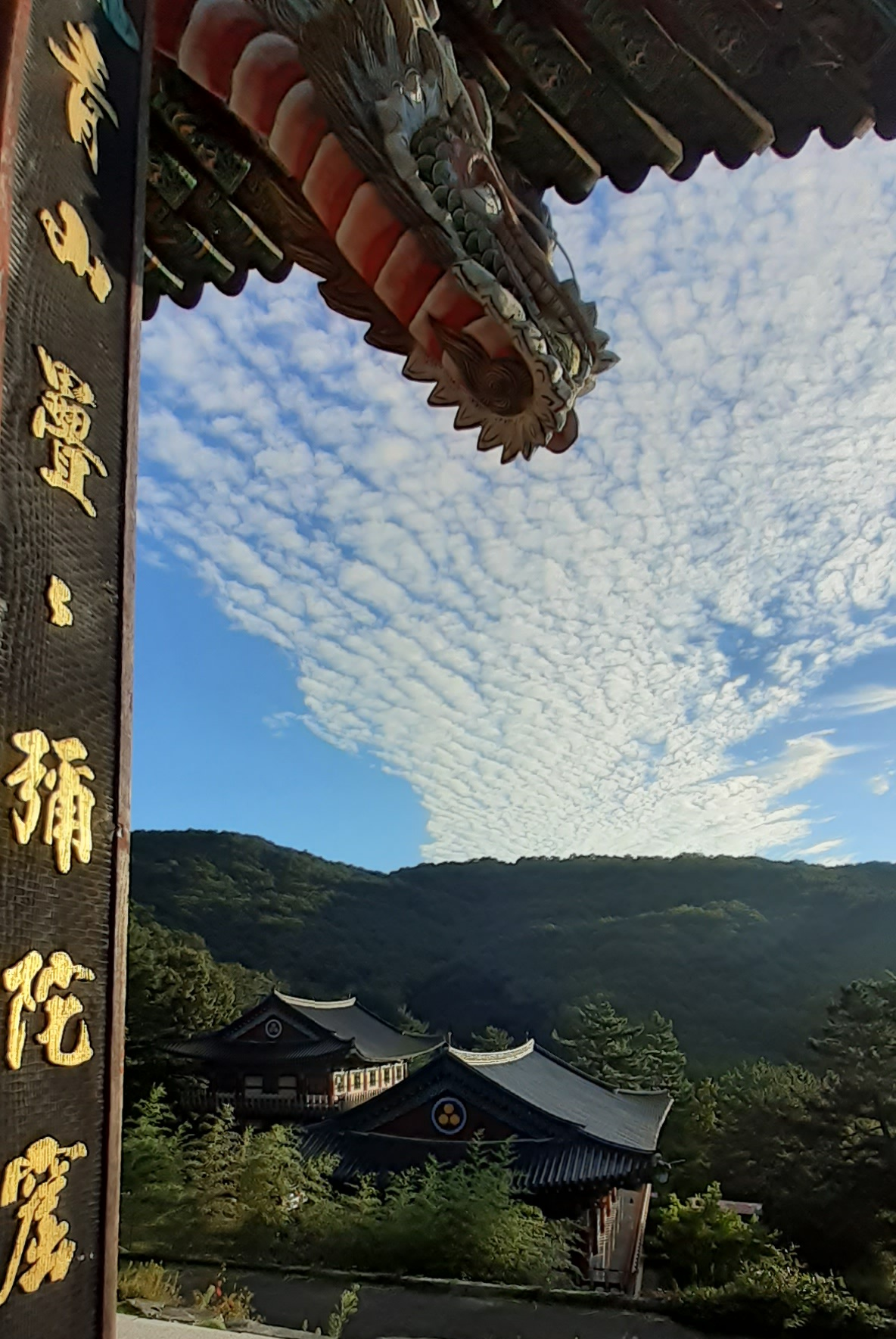
Sky is blue, white clouds floating back and forth.
